= List of phonograph manufacturers =

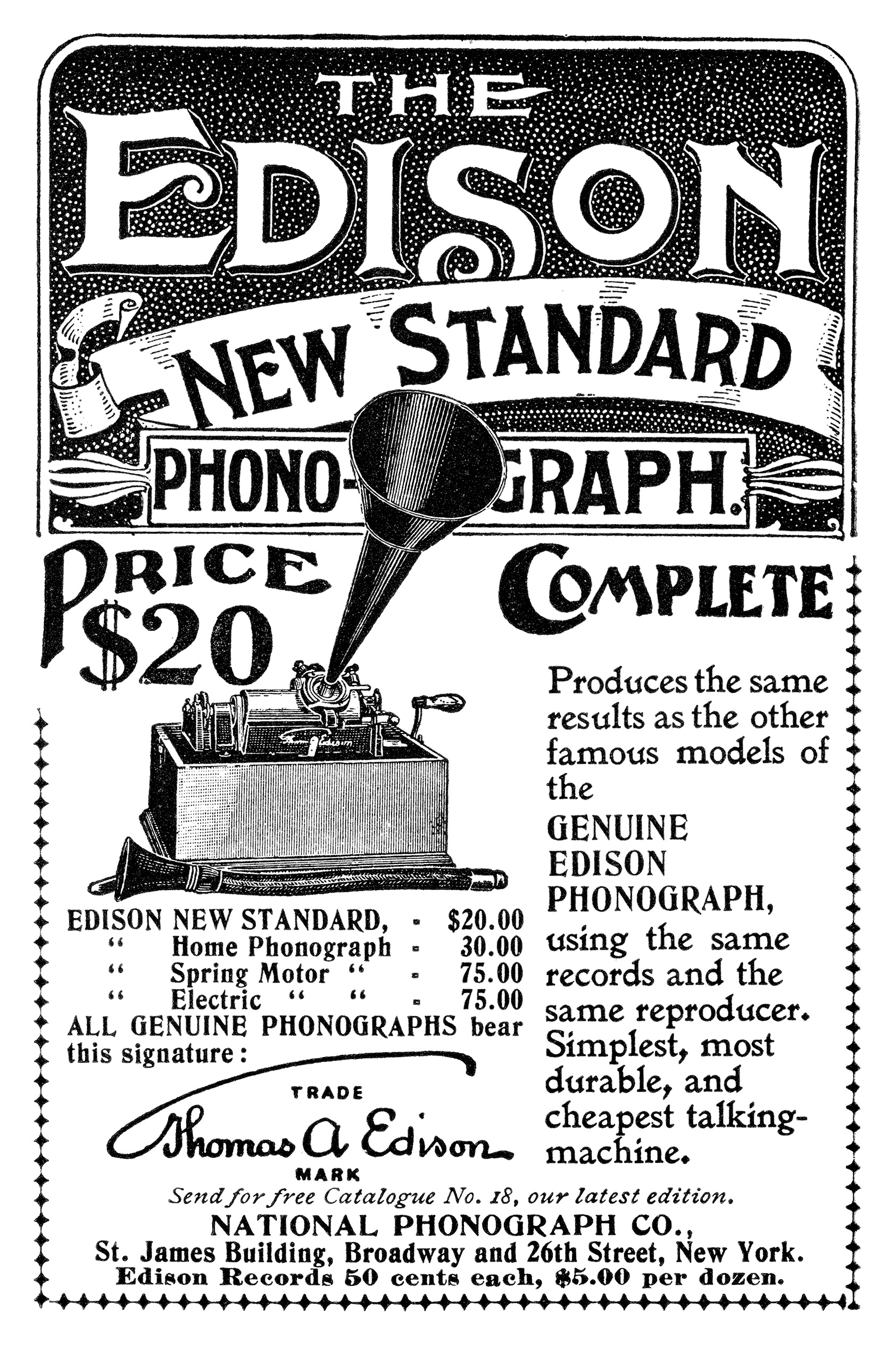
An advertisement for Edison New Standard Phonograph, 1898

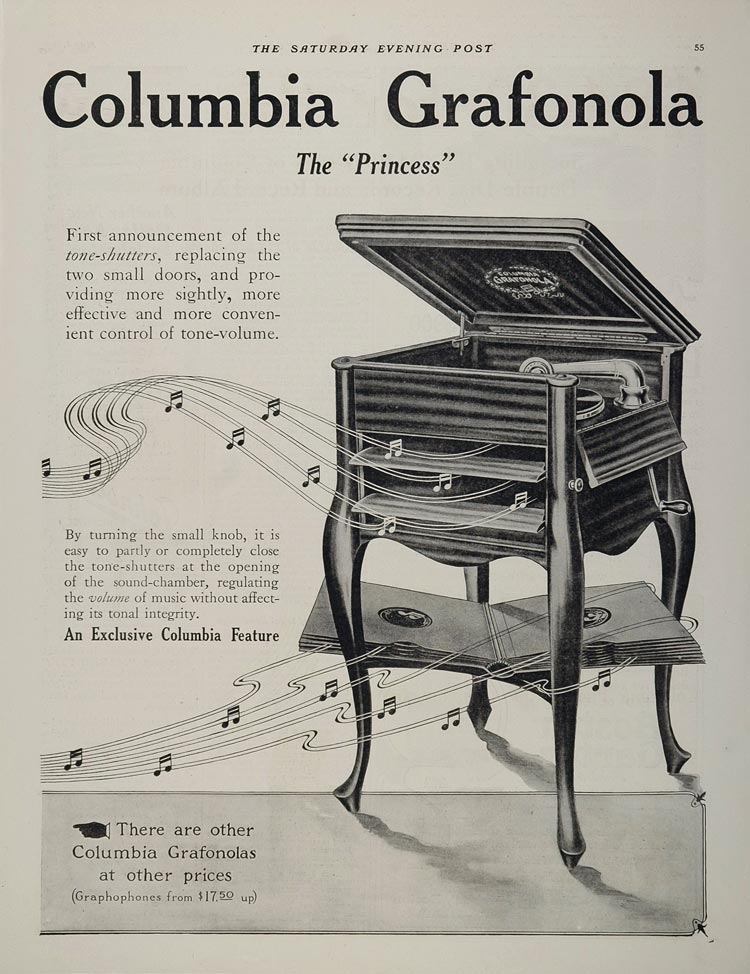
An advertisement for the Columbia Grafonola

This is a list of phonograph manufacturers. The phonograph, in its later forms also called a gramophone, record player or turntable, is a device introduced in 1877 for the mechanical recording and reproduction of sound. Phonographs can also specifically refer to machines that only play Phonograph cylinders, the gramophone is an advanced version of the phonograph that only plays disc Phonograph records. Record players and turntables usually refer to more modern machines.

== Phonograph manufacturers ==
- Abbingdon Music Research
- Acoustic Research
- Acoustic Signature
- Akai
- Alphason
- AnalogueWorks
- Audio-Technica
- Junxi Technology
- Bang & Olufsen
- Bergman
- Birmingham Sound Reproducers aka BSR
- Brinkmann Audio GmbH
- Cambridge Audio
- Clearaudio Electronic
- Collaro
- Columbia Graphophone Company
- Columbia Gramophone Company
- Columbia Phonograph Company
- Connoisseur
- Crosley
- Dansette
- Denon
- Dohmann Audio
- Dr. Feickert Analogue
- Dual
- EMG
- Empire
- Fluance by Electrohome
- Garrard Engineering and Manufacturing Company
- Gemini Sound Products
- Goldring
- Gramophone Company
- Graphophone
- Grundig
- Harman Kardon
- Hitachi
- IGB Eletrônica
- JBL
- J.Sikora
- JVC
- Kimball Phonograph
- Kuzma
- Kyocera
- Langer
- Lenco Turntables
- Linn Products
- Logic
- London Decca
- Luxman
- Luxor
- Lyric Phonograph Company
- Magnavox
- Michell
- Musical Fidelity
- NAD Electronics
- Maplenoll
- Marantz
- McIntosh Labs
- Mitsubishi
- Mofi Electronics (Mobile Fidelity Sound Labs)
- Nakamichi
- National Phonograph Company
- North American Phonograph Company
- Nottingham Analogue Studio
- Numark Industries
- Origin Live
- Ortofon
- Onkyo
- Pacific Phonograph Company
- Paillard
- Panasonic
- Philips
- Pink Triangle
- Pioneer Corporation
- Pro-Ject
- RCA
- Realistic
- Rega Research
- Roksan Audio
- Sansui Electric
- Sanyo
- Sherwood
- Silvertone Sold by Sears
- Simon Yorke
- SME Limited
- Sonora Phonograph Company
- Sony Corporation
- Stanton Magnetics
- TEAC
- TechDAS
- Technics
- Telefunken
- Tesla
- Thorens
- Transcriptors
- Townshend Audio
- U-Turn Audio
- Vestax
- Victor Talking Machine Company
- V-M Corporation - Voice of Music
- VPI Industries
- Webster-Chicago -Webcor
- Wagner Audio
- Well Tempered Lab
- Wilson Benesch
- Win Laboratories
- Yamaha Corporation
- Yamaha Pro Audio
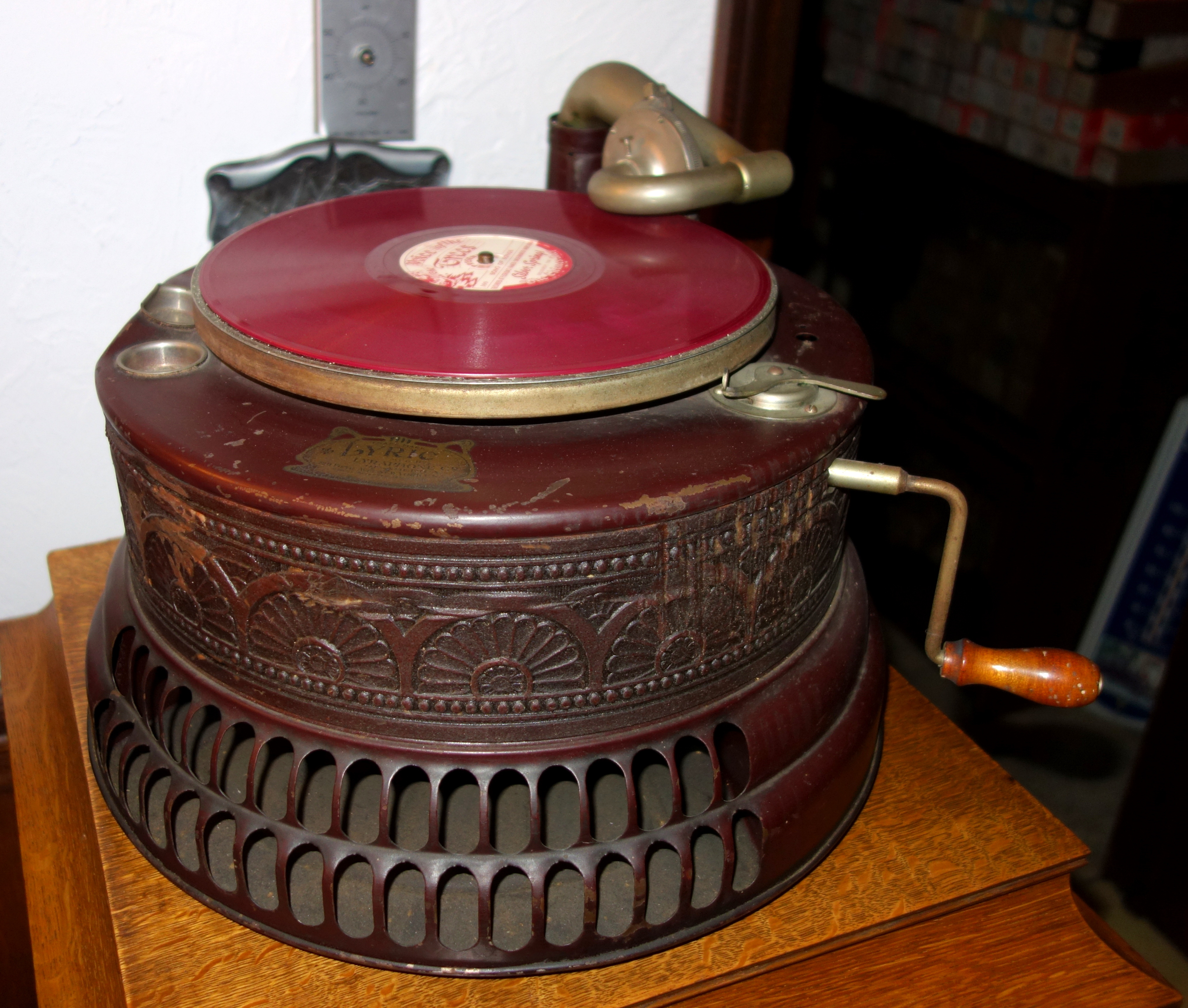
A Lyricera Phonograph Company phonograph

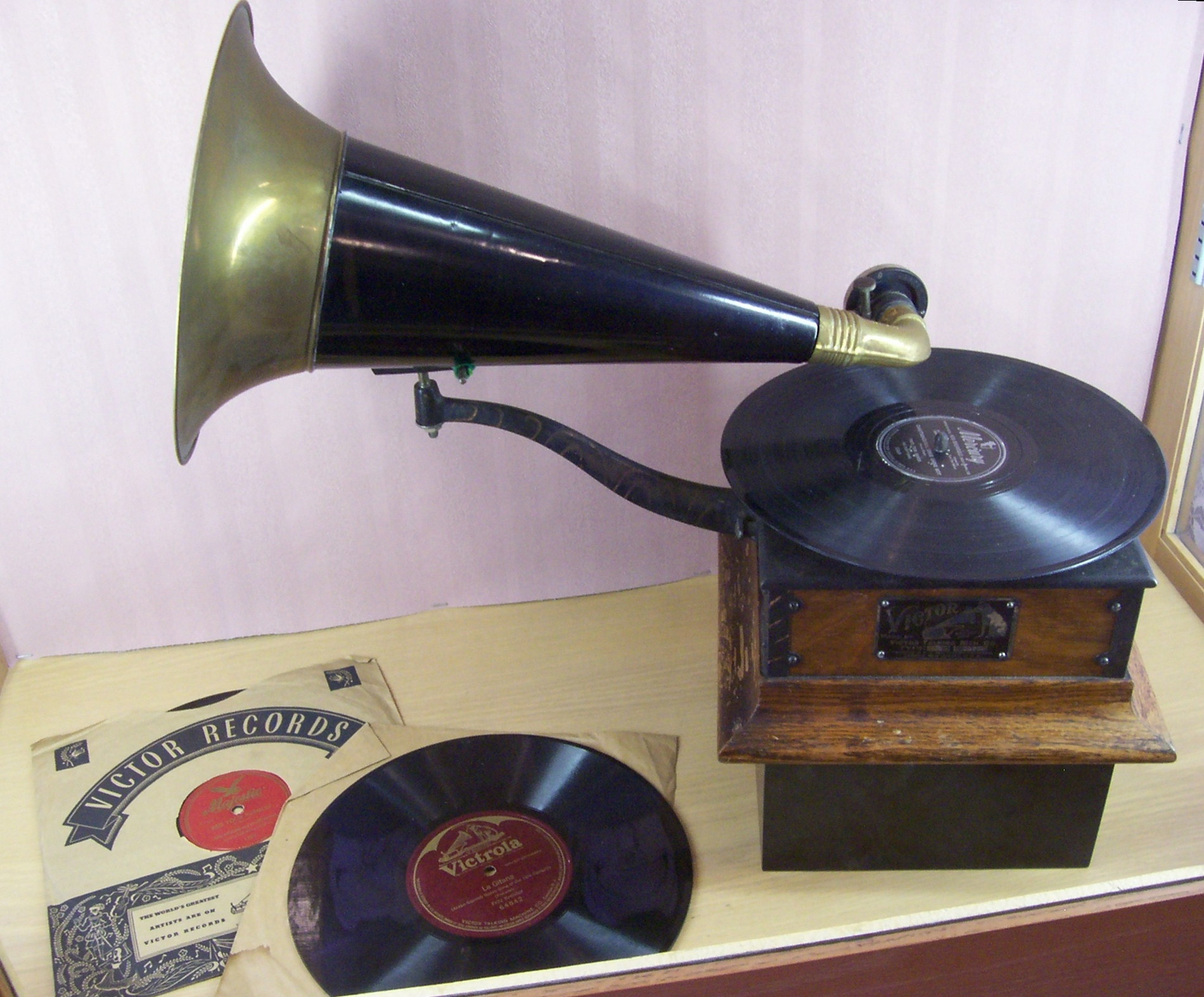
A Victor Talking Machine

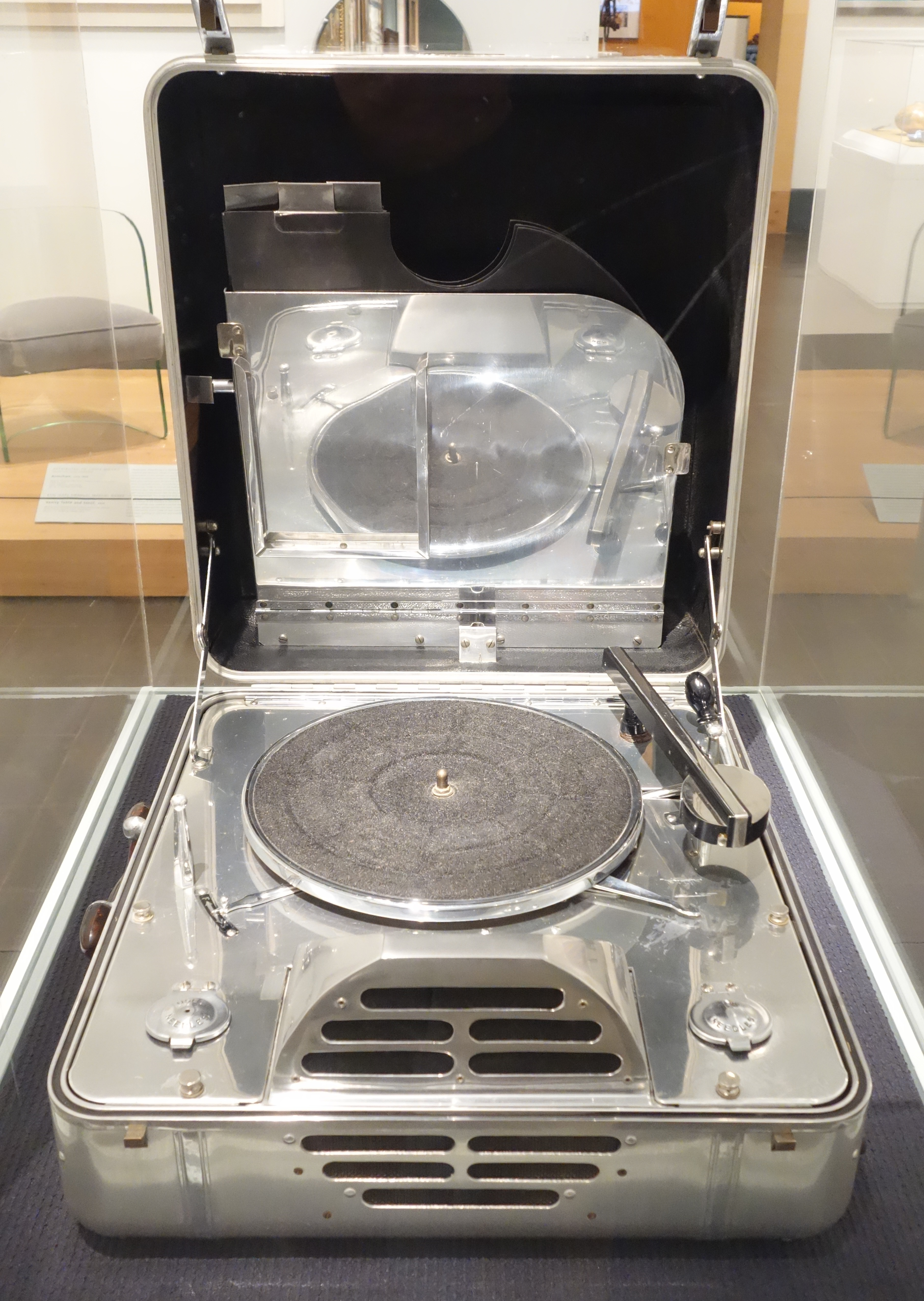
An RCA Victor Special Portable Phonograph, c. 1935

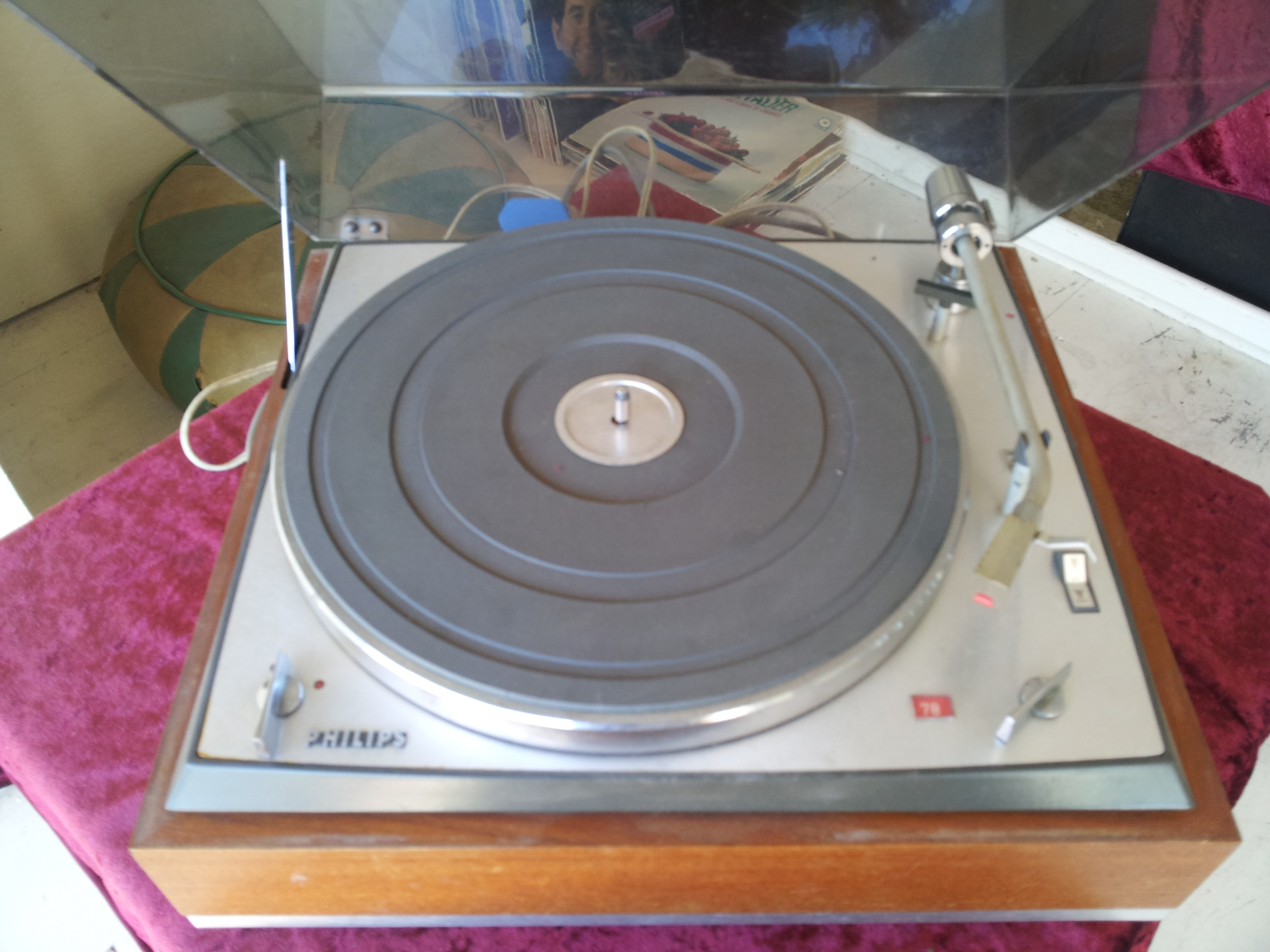
Philips vintage turntable

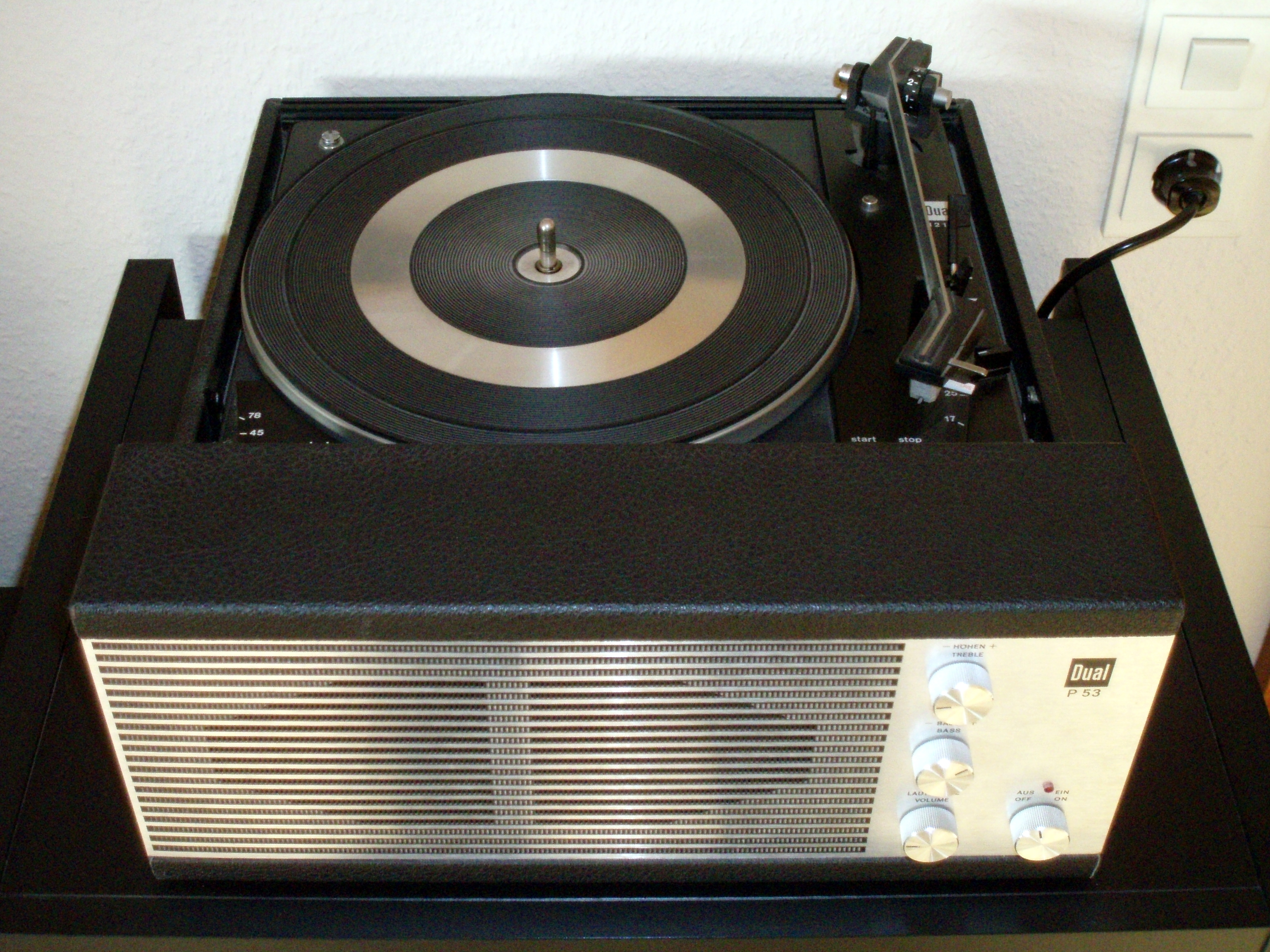
A Dual P 53 record player with 1210 turntable

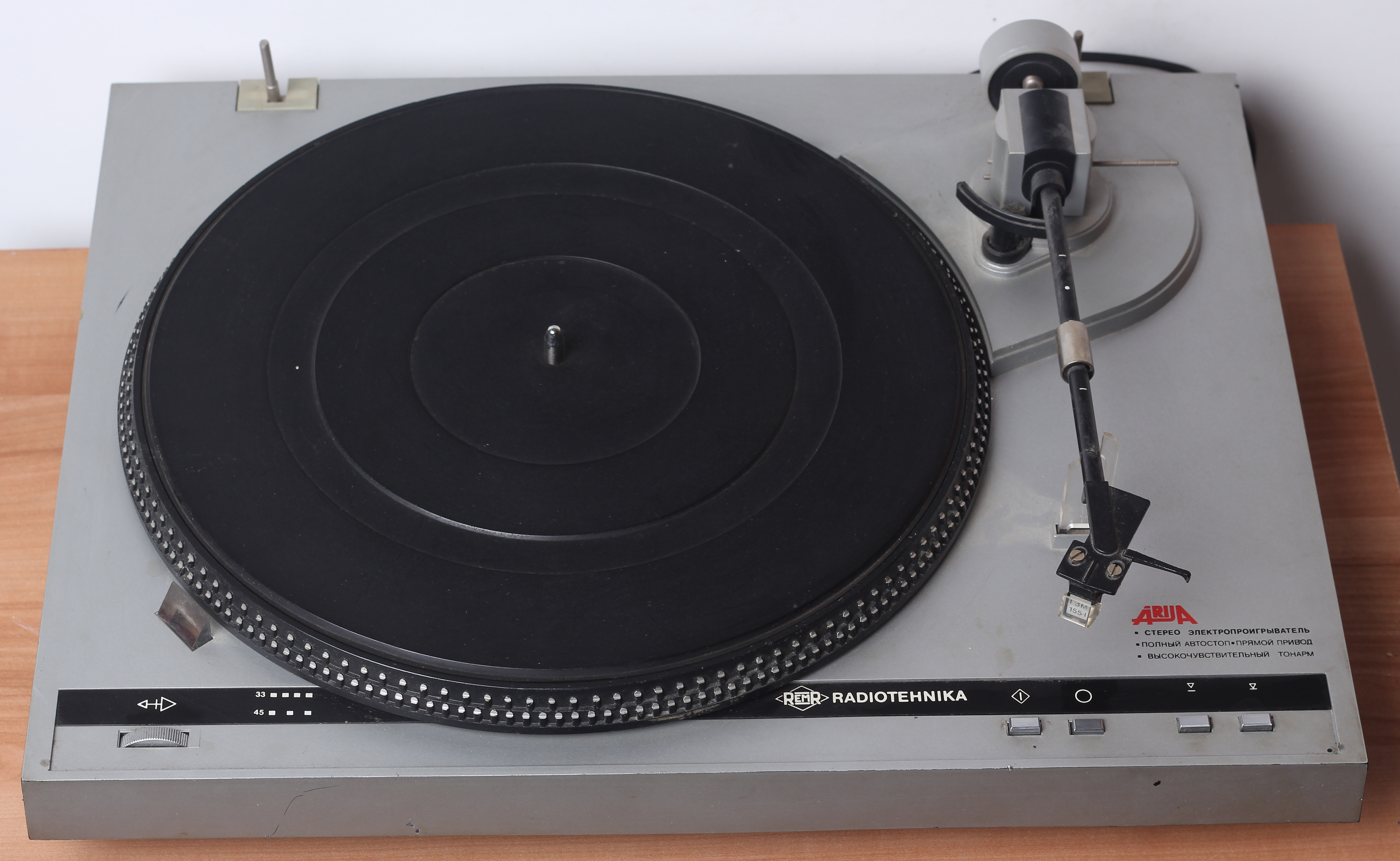
Arija 102 turntable (Soviet Union)

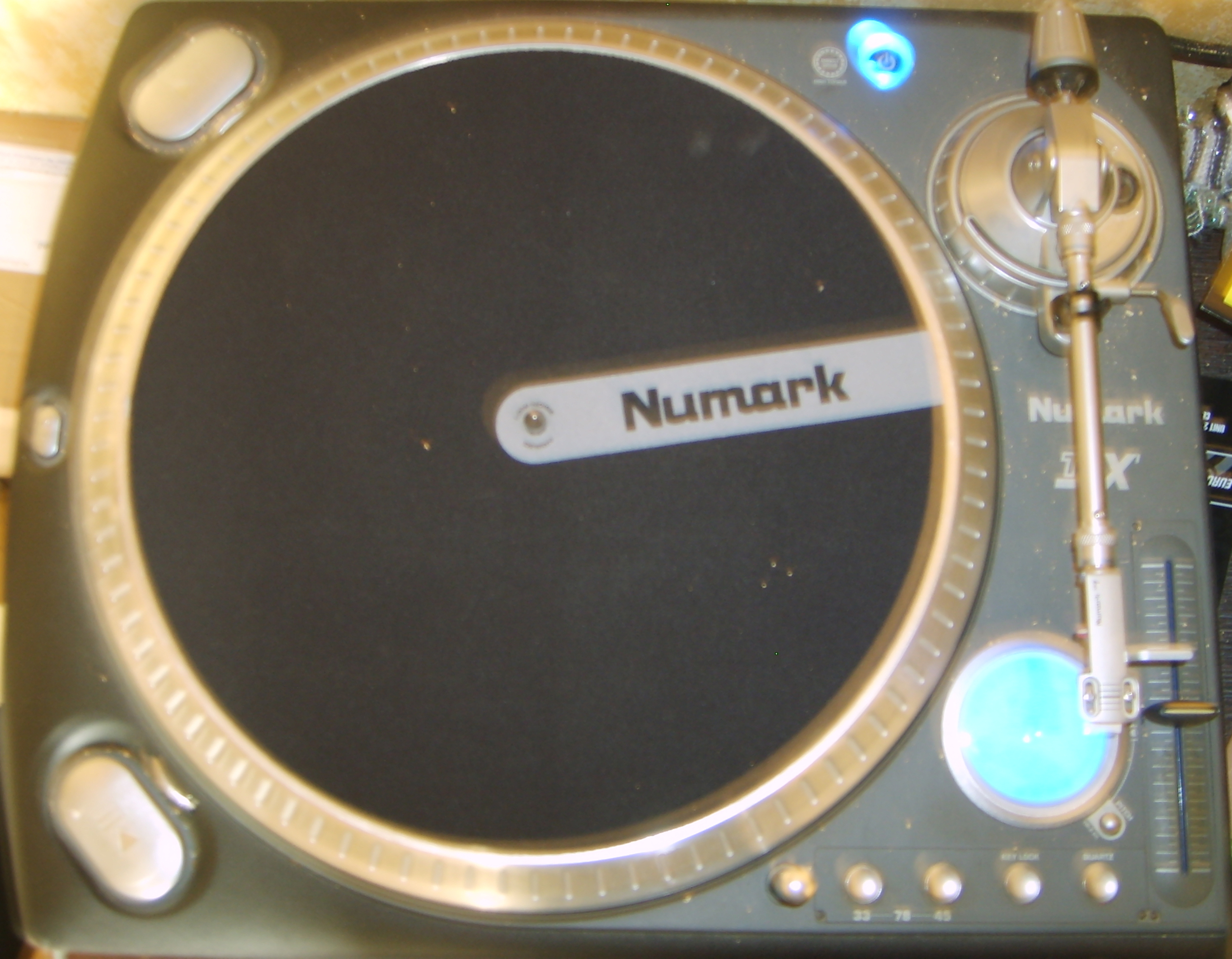
A Numark Industries TTX-1 turntable

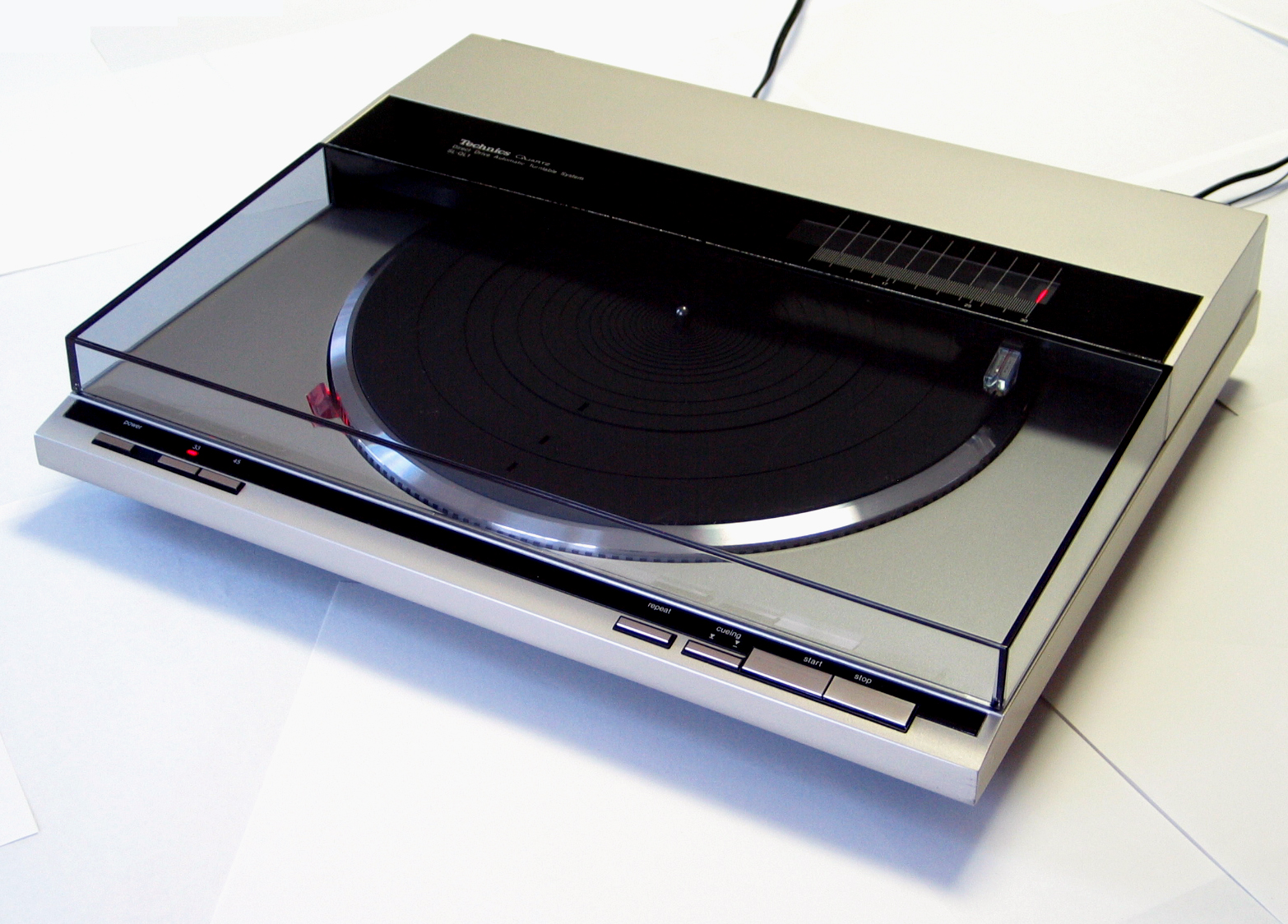
A Technics turntable

A Pro-Ject 1xpression Comfort turntable

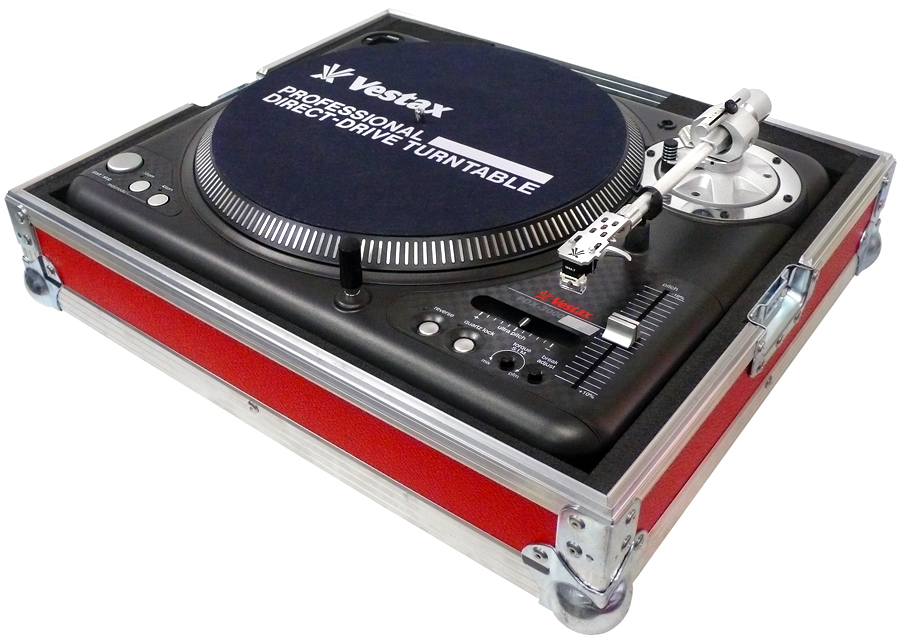
A Vestax PDX-3000 DJ turntable

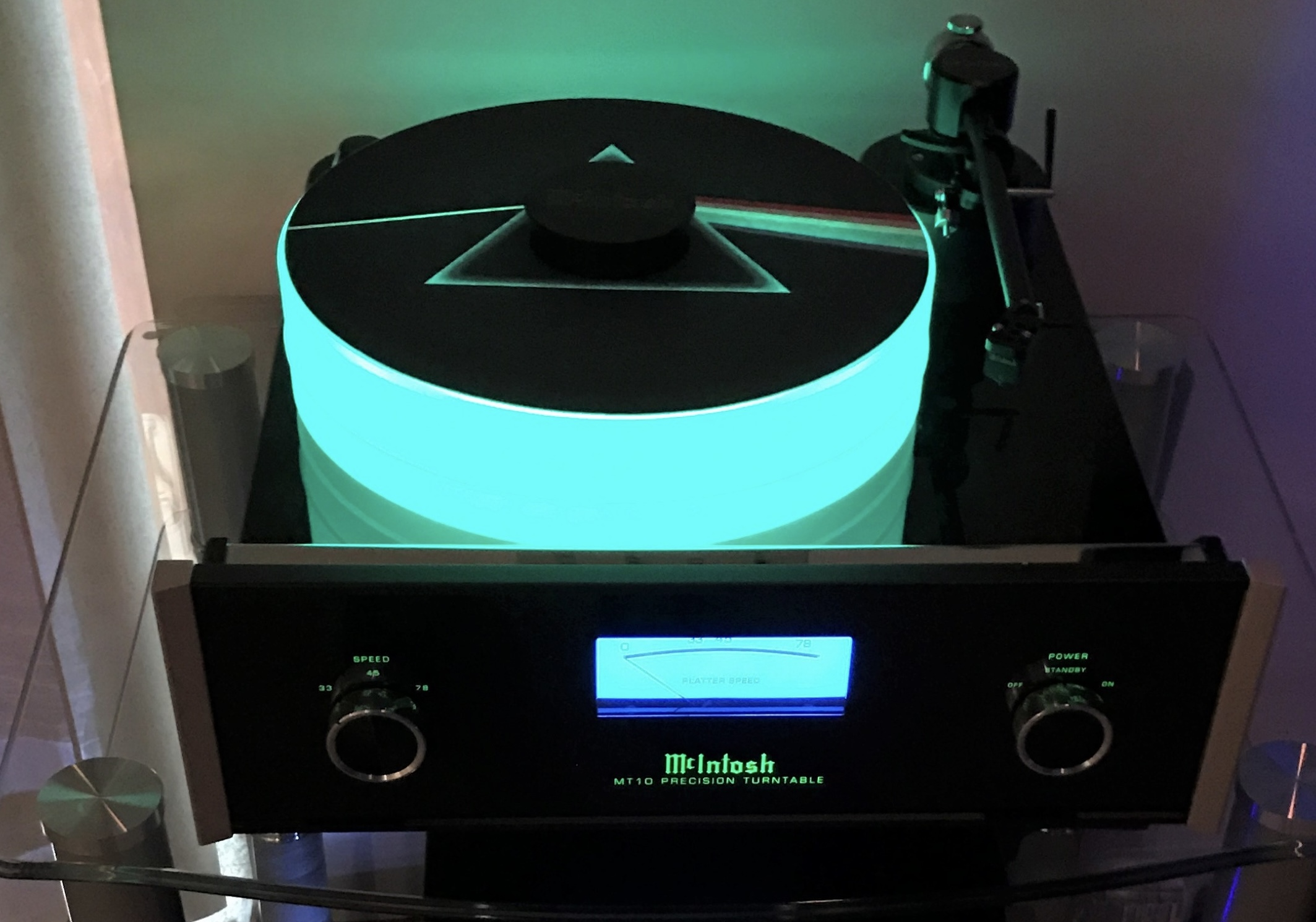
McIntosh MT10 Precision Turntable

== By region ==
=== United States ===
In 1890 in the United States, many phonograph companies existed that had state- and region-based names, such as Alabama Phonograph Company, Colorado and Utah Phonograph Company, Kansas Phonograph Company, New England Phonograph Company, etc.

== See also ==
- Phonograph record
- List of bass amplifier and loudspeaker manufacturers
- List of compact disc player manufacturers
- List of loudspeaker manufacturers
- List of microphone manufacturers
- List of record labels
- Nipper the dog
