= List of compact disc player manufacturers =

This is a list of compact disc player manufacturers. A CD player is an electronic device that plays audio compact discs. CD players are often a part of home stereo systems, car audio systems, and personal computers. They are also manufactured as portable devices. Modern units can play other formats in addition to PCM audio coding used in CDs, such as MP3, AAC and WMA. DJs often use players with an adjustable playback speed to alter the pitch and tempo of the music. CD playback functionality is also available on CD-ROM/DVD-ROM drive equipped computers as well as on DVD players and CD-ROM/DVD-ROM based game consoles.

== Compact disc player manufacturers ==
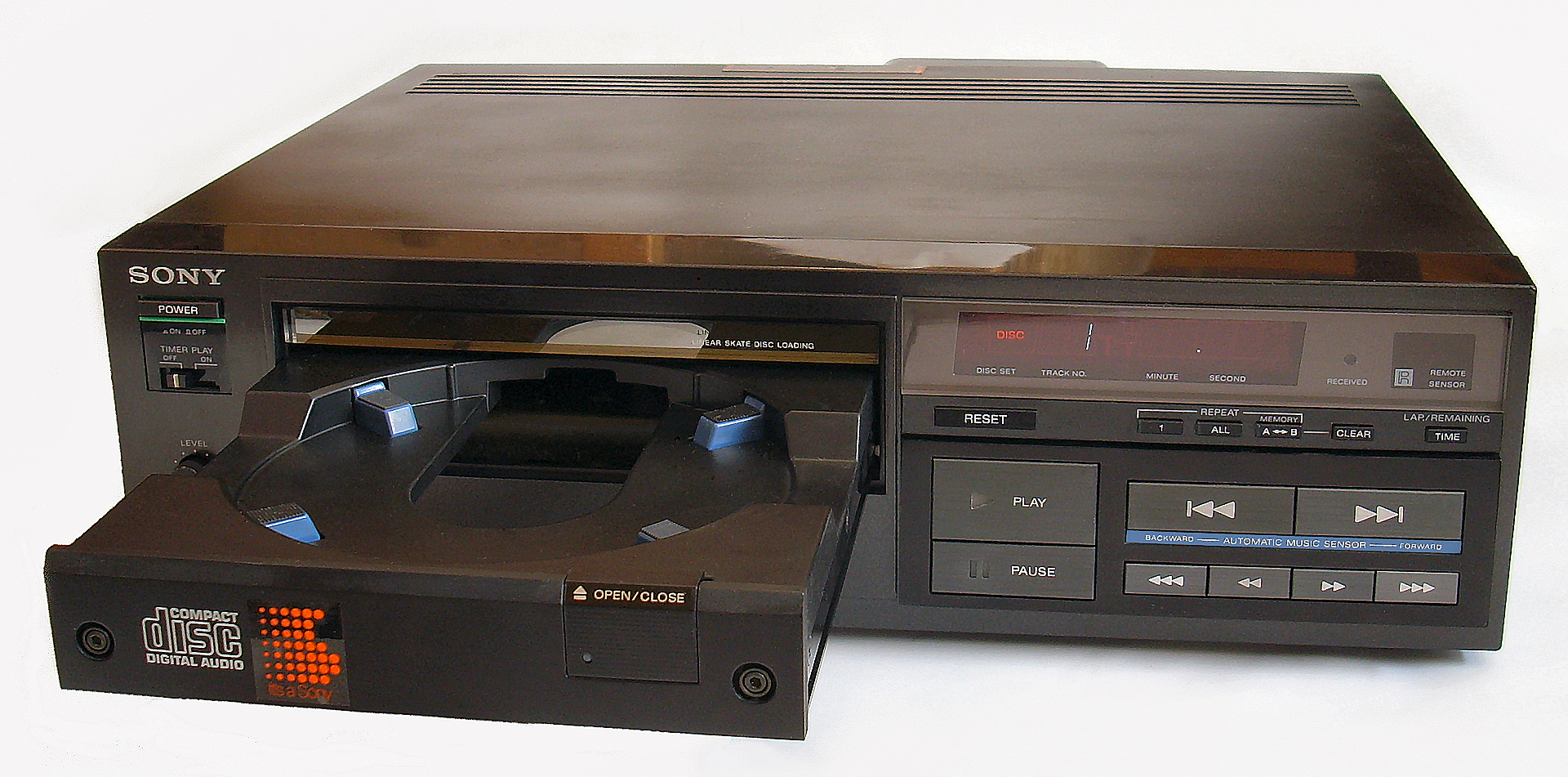
A Sony CDP-101 from 1982, one of the earliest CD players affordable to consumers

- A&R Cambridge Ltd
- Abbingdon Music Research
- Accuphase
- Audiolab
- Bang & Olufsen
- Bose Corporation
- Boulder Amplifiers
- Cambridge Audio
- Classé
- Creek Audio
- Denon
- Emotiva Audio
- Harman Kardon
- Krell Industries
- Linn Products
- Luxman
- Mark Levinson Audio Systems
- Marantz
- McIntosh Laboratory
- Meridian Audio
- Mordaunt-Short
- Musical Fidelity
- NAD Electronics
- Naim Audio
- Pink Triangle (audio manufacturer)
- PS Audio
- Quad Electroacoustics
- Rega Research
- Roksan Audio
- Rotel
- Steinway Lyngdorf
- T-Series
- TEAC Corporation
- Yamaha Corporation
- Yamaha Pro Audio

== See also ==
- Consumer electronics
