= SME Limited =

English record turntable and tonearm company

SME
- Company type: Limited company
- Industry: High-end audio
- Founded: 1946
- Founder: Alastair Robertson-Aikman
- Headquarters: Steyning, West Sussex, England
- Products: Turntable tonearms and related equipment
- Owner: Ajay Shirke
- Website: https://sme.co.uk/

SME is a brand name of an English company that produces high end tonearms and turntables, whose name has become synonymous with the industry standard detachable headshell mount.

== History ==
SME was founded by Alastair Robertson-Aikman in 1946 under the title The Scale Model Equipment Company Limited to manufacture scale models and detail parts for the model engineering trade. It was During the 1950s the company moved away from model making to precision engineering, principally parts for aircraft instruments and business machines.

In 1959, Robertson-Aikman required a pick-up arm for his own use, and an experimental model was built. It received such an enthusiastic reception from friends in the sound industry that it was decided to produce it commercially and the first SME precision pick-up arm appeared in September 1959. Production was 25 units per week composed entirely of individually machined components. In 1961 a new factory situated in Mill Road, Steyning, Sussex was opened and the company's name was changed to SME Limited, a less committal title to suit its new activities.

In December 2016 the company was acquired by Ajay Shirke with a view to preserving the brand's legacy and extending research and development activities, appointing a new CEO and a distributor for the UK market, Padood.

In May 2018 the company acquired the rights to the Garrard Transcription Turntable brand as well as Loricraft Audio, the only officially authorised Garrard service agent. Intending to develop the Garrard audio brand in the near future.

== Products ==
=== Tonearms ===
==== Series II ====
The Series II arm was SME's first arm. It came in two variants the 3009 and 3012 (9" and 12" respectively) tone arms which were widely adopted for audiophile and broadcast use during the 1960s and 1970s, at the higher end of the market. These arms featured a polished, bright-anodised aluminium main tube with a lightweight headshell, knife edge horizontal bearings, and an anti skating bias provided by a weight that hung by a nylon filament. Versions were produced with both fixed and interchangeable headshells; the SME headshell mount (based on an Ortofon design) became the de facto industry standard, and is still widely used today on consumer and especially DJ decks. Audiophile arms today tend to not use the SME mount, but this is not due to other standards replacing the SME but because audiophile arms now tend to not have interchangeable headshells at all in an effort to reduce mass and improve rigidity, though at slight expense of user flexibility.

==== Series III ====
The Series III was introduced in the late 1970s incorporating changes from the Series II models (which continued in production) covering both styling and its exceptionally thin and lightweight main tube, the entire arm being interchangeable rather than just the headshell. The Series III had very low effective mass to fit high compliance cartridges such as the Shure V15 IV.

==== Series V ====
The Series V arm launched in 1986, was developed as a medium mass arm more suited to emerging moving-coil cartridges with lower compliance than previously available moving magnet cartridges. The removable headshell was eliminated, and the horizontal knife bearing was replaced with ball bearings (grade ABEC 7), both in order to provide a more rigid structure for the cartridge.

==== Series IV ====
The Series IV arm launched in 1987 was a cheaper variation of the Series V. It was mechanically and electrically identical to the Series V with the exception of using lower grade (ABEC 7) bearings than the Series V and due to the omission of the damping trough used in the Series V.

==== Series 300 ====
The Series 300< arm launched in 1988 was a lower specification arm based on the same design concept as the Series V and IV arms. It still used a magnesium alloy arm, but had a removable headshell. It came in three models 309, 310 and 312 with lengths of 9, 10 and 12 inches respectively.

==== M10 ====
The M10 arm launched in 1999 is derived from the Series 300 Model 309 (but with lower grade ABEC 1 bearings) is only for use with the SME Model 10 turntable.

==== Series M2 ====
The Series M2 arm launched in 2004 is the companies lowest spec currently available, and the only arm made by SME that can be bought separately at this time. It comes in three models with lengths of 9, 10 and 12 inches.

==== Series VA ====
The Series VA arm is only available on the Model 60 turntable. It is an advanced version of the Series V tonearm which has been extensively sonically improved by use of a non-metallic tonearm CNC machined from an advanced polymer resin material with high density and high rigidity properties. The Series VA tonearm tube is acoustically inert with a significantly reduced resonance signature, optimised effective mass and a wide cartridge balance weight range.

== Gallery ==
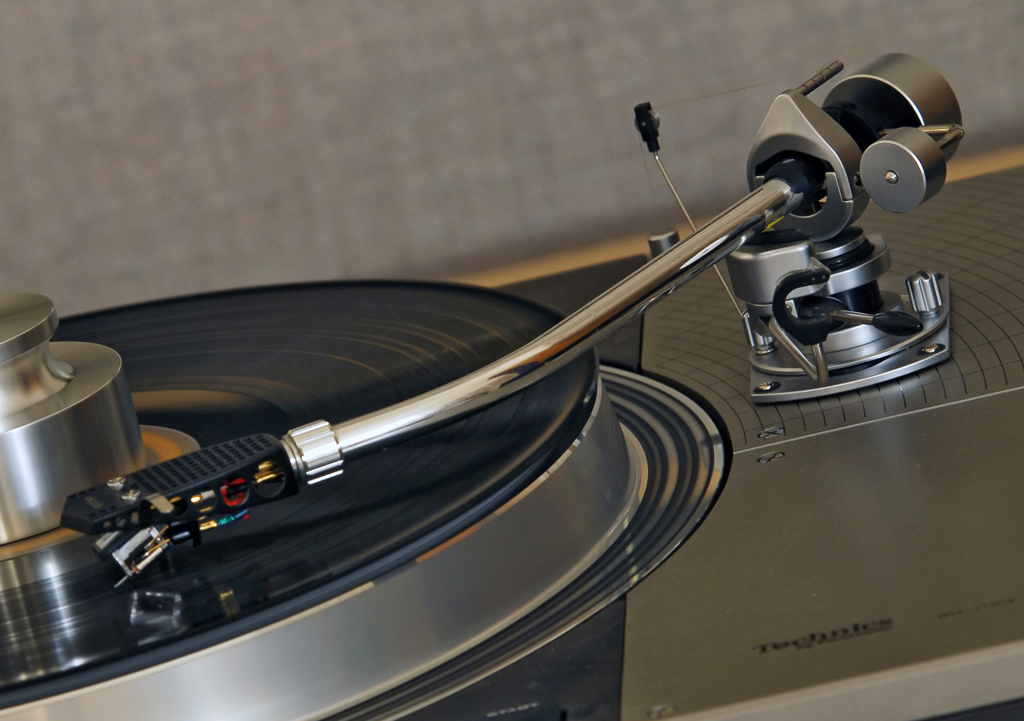
SME 3009 Series II tonearm on Technics SL110 turntable

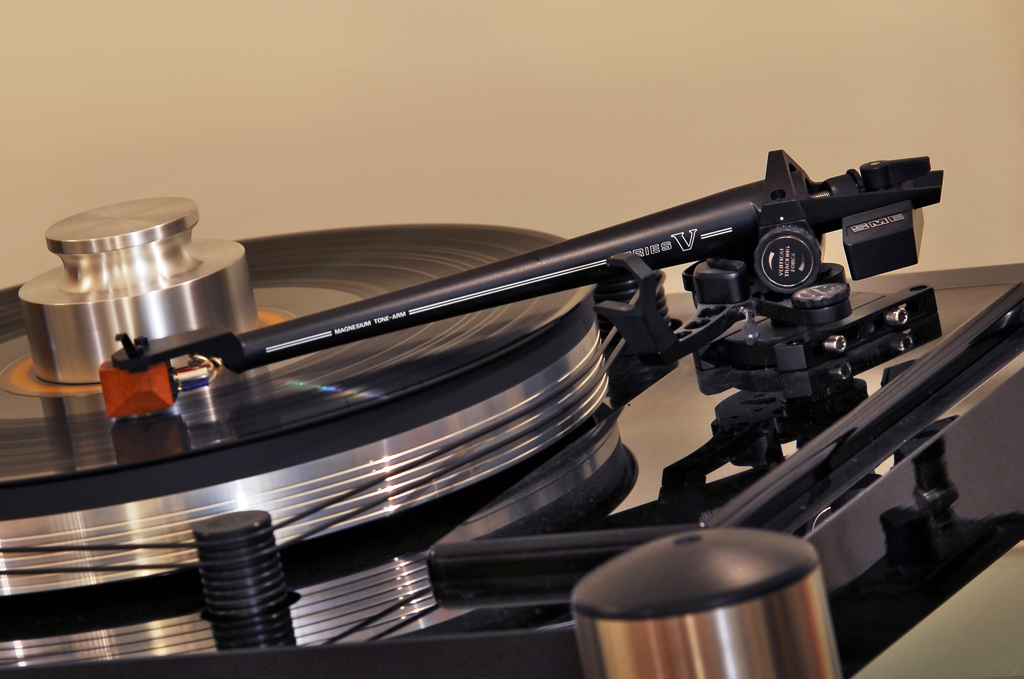
SME V tonearm on a VPI TNT III turntable

== See also ==
- List of phonograph manufacturers
