= Vestax =

Japanese music equipment company

Vestax Corporation ベスタクス株式会社
- Formerly: Shiino Musical Instruments Developing Corporation 椎野楽器設計事務所
- Type: K.K.
- Industry: Electronic musical instrument
- Founded: November 1977 in Tokyo, Japan
- Founder: Hidesato Shiino
- Defunct: 5 December 2014 (bankruptcy proceedings decision)
- Headquarters: 1-18-6, Wakabayashi, Setagaya-ku, Tokyo, Japan,
- Key people: Kanako Ohsawa (trustee in bankruptcy), Toshihide Nakama (previous president)
- Products: DJ equipment (DJ mixer, CD players, turntables, phonograph cutting machines, DJ controllers), multitrack recorders, effectors, guitar preamps, electric guitars, etc.
- Website: http://www.vestax.jp/ (closed)

Vestax Corporation was a Japanese musical instrument, turntable and audio equipment firm founded by Hidesato Shiino in 1977. The company started by designing and manufacturing electronic guitars. In the 1980s, Vestax produced multitrack recorders and later moved to making DJ mixers, professional turntables, CD players and signal processors. Debt troubles led to the company's bankruptcy at the end of 2014.

== History ==
The Vestax Corporation of Japan began in 1977 as a designer and manufacturer of electronic guitars. In the 1980s Vestax introduced a series of cassette-based multitracks, including the Vestax MR66, to challenge established products from Fostex, Yamaha and Tascam's portastudios.

=== Competing in the turntable market ===
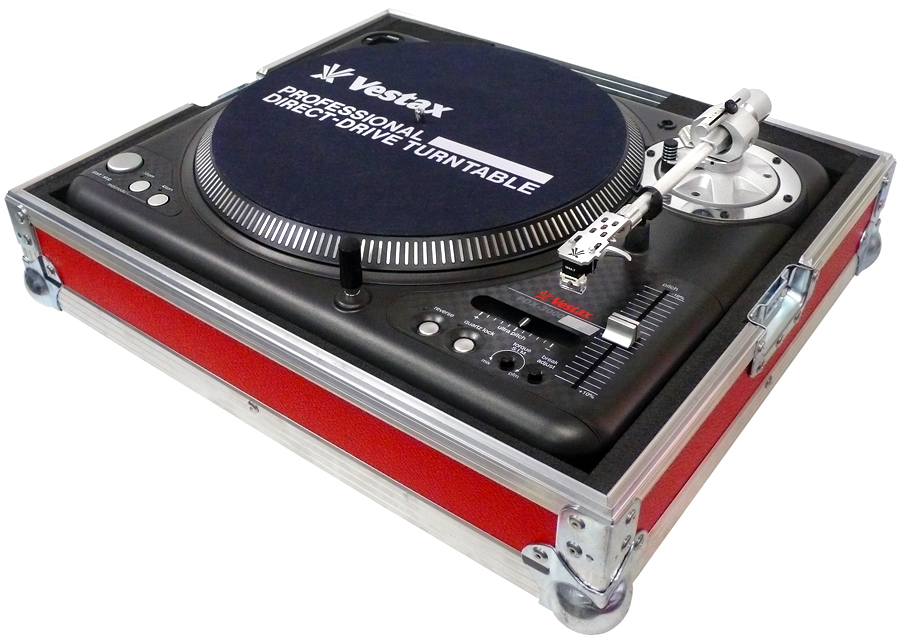
DJ Turntable: PDX-3000

During the late 1990s Vestax launched a new flagship range of professional DJ turntables. The PDX models had higher specifications than the two market leading products from Technics and were priced in direct competition with the Technics SL1210/SL1200.

However, the industry standard Technics SL1210/SL1200 models remained the favourite of DJs worldwide. At the time they were an established brand with a twenty-year head start. There have also been some build quality issues reported throughout 2008 and 2009.

This pattern of events has been replicated by other DJ equipment manufacturers such as Numark, Gemini and Stanton. These turntables have either a higher specification or lower cost, in sheer numbers sold they are still dwarfed by the various versions of the Technics SL-1200 & SL-1210 series.

=== Expanding range ===
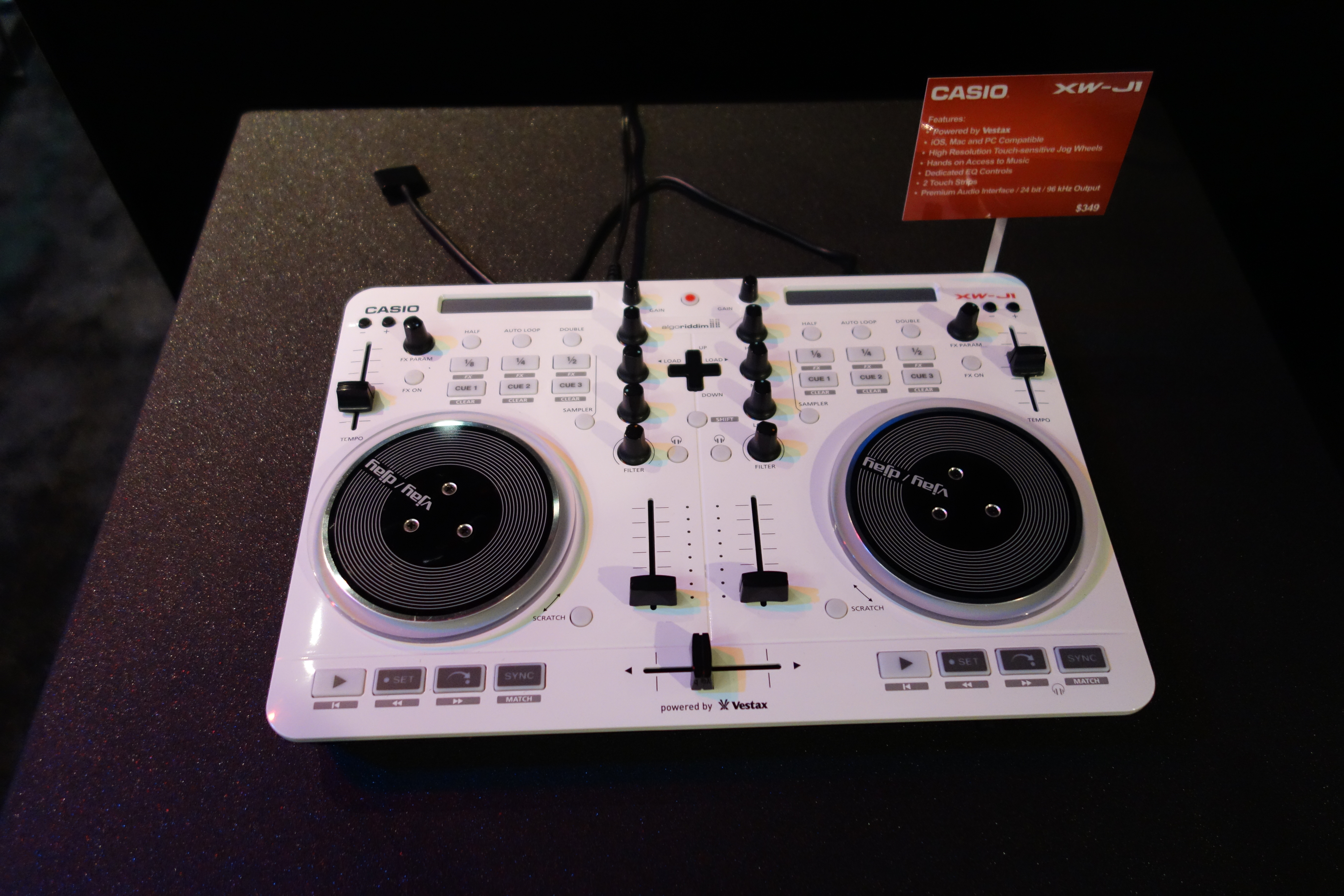
Casio XW-J1 DJ Controller (2015) is credited "Powered by Vestax".

In 2006, Vestax entered the digital DJ market with the release of the VCI 100, an all-in-one DJ controller for use with digital DJ software. The controller combined jog wheels and a mixer in a compact unit, a design that subsequently adopted in many later DJ controllers. helping to re-establish Vestax expanded its controller range with models including the VCI-380 and VCI-400.

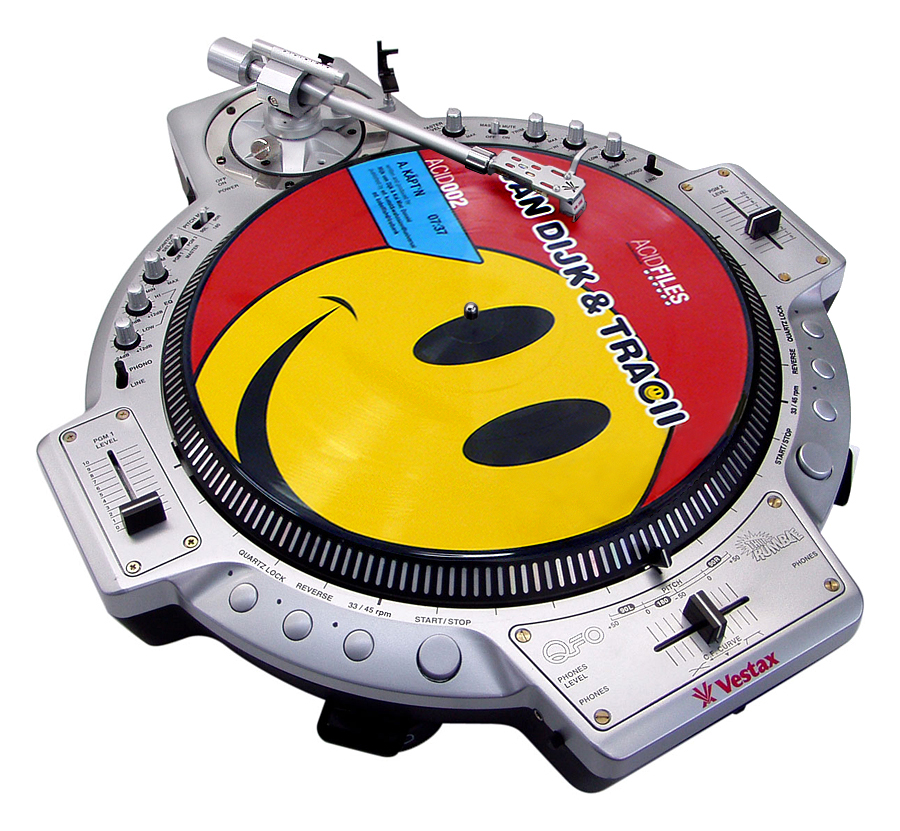
DJ Turntable: QFO

In the 2010s Vestax focused on high-tech musical electronics, creating signal processors, DJ Mixers, professional turntables and CD players. The company also reduced its range of turntables, but kept the PDX-2000mk2/2300mk2 for mainstream DJ use, and the PDX-2000mk2pro/PDX-2300pro with a new tonearm suspension system for increased skip resistance. In conjunction with DJ Qbert they have also released the QFO and QFO LE models. These turntables have built-in mixers, and a portable turntable/mixer

=== Debt troubles ===
In mid-October 2014, many websites reported a speculative piece investigating reports from the Japanese news source "Teikoku News Online", that Vestax was ceasing operations. Retailers in the US closed shop, and there was a lack of representation or new products being revealed at trade shows. On 5 December Vestax started bankruptcy proceedings with a debt of 900 million yen (roughly $7.5 million USD).

== Technology ==
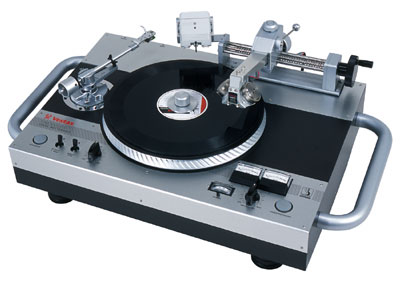
Vinyl Cutting Machine: VRX-2000

Vestax was the first manufacturer to release a vinyl cutting machine for home vinyl cutting of new mixes / dubplate, in 2001.

Vestax innovated with their turntable using a straight tone arm, which gave greater tracking force; useful for complex DJing maneuvers such as scratching or beat juggling. This has been adopted by virtually all other turntable manufacturers, with the exception of Technics. Some maintain however that the straight arm increases wear upon the record. This is based on the premise that the original 's' shaped tonearm is so designed as to naturally gravitate toward the center of the record. The straight arm will not do this, and so will theoretically drag more as the record rotates, wearing down the grooves. Vestax however have consistently denied this.

== Mixers ==
For many years Vestax had been creating professional mobile DJ style mixers, but in the early 1990s they started creating mixers focusing on the developing Turntablism scene. Two of the first early attempts were the Vestax PMC-05FX and PMC-05 Trix mixers. These were simple mixers which were endorsed by famous DJs and had a stripped down layout. They had features (like a centered crossfader which was replaceable). They were also a small size which made juggling and other techniques easier. But they lacked some key features like a smooth crossfader, hamster switch, EQ controls, and an unobstructed crossfader area. During the 1993 NAMM Show, Vestax began talking to DJs (including DJ Shortkut, DJ Rhettmatic, and DJ Q-Bert) about creating mixers which took some of the best features from previous models and catered to the emerging turntablism scene. The PMC-05 Pro was the first model which came out of these conversations. It was a major step forward for DJs competing in DJ battles. It had a smooth, quick cut crossfader which was adjustable. The crossfader was also not surrounded by any screws or physical barriers, which made scratching and juggling easier. Other features included headphone cueing, 2 band EQs, and independent gains per channel.

=== Mixer Models ===
- PMC-05 Series
  - PMC-05Pro
  - PMC-05Pro Limited Edition
  - PMC-05ProII
  - PMC-05ProD Samurai
  - PMC-05ProQ
  - PMC-05ProIII
  - PMC-05ProSL
  - PMC-05ProIIIVCA
  - PMC-05ProSLVCA
  - PMC-05ProIIIDX
  - PMC-05ProIV
- PMC-06 Series
  - PMC-06T
  - PMC-06Pro
  - PMC-06ProA
  - PMC-06ProD Samurai
  - PMC-06ProVCA
- PMC-07 Series
  - PMC-07Pro
  - PMC-07ProISP
  - PMC-07ProD Samurai
  - PMC-007
  - PMC-37 Pro
- PMC-50 Series
  - PMC-50
  - PMC-50A
  - PMC-55
  - PMC-500
  - PMC-580Pro
- PCV Series
  - PCV-002
  - PCV-150
  - PCV-175
  - PCV-175R (rotary version)
  - PCV-180
  - PCV-275
  - PCV-275R (rotary version)

== Influence ==
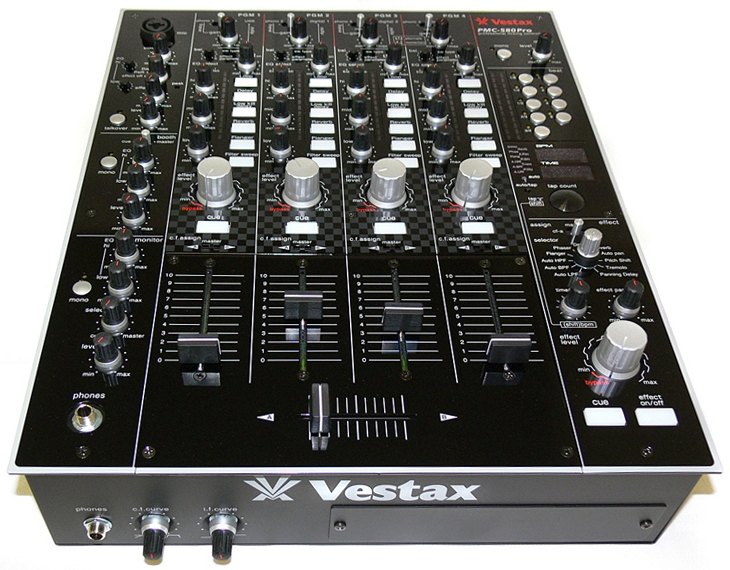
DJ Mixer: PMC-580 Pro

Vestax focused on the needs of nightclubs and Disc jockeys and their DJ mixers became favourites of international DJs such as Carl Cox, Jeff Mills, DJ QBert and Cut Chemist. Mixers such as the various iterations of the PMC-05pro have become staples of the Hip Hop DJ community, and they also have manufactured signature models for DJ's such as Carl Cox and DJ Qbert.

== See also ==
- List of phonograph manufacturers
