= VPI =

VPI may refer to:

== Science and technology ==
- Vapor phase infiltration, a technique
- Velopharyngeal insufficiency, a medical disorder
- Verilog Procedural Interface, a programming interface
- Virtual path identifier, in computer networking
- Virtual protocol interconnect, a feature of Mellanox Technologies

== Organizations ==
- Vertical Politics Institute, a conservative political action committee
- Vietnam Petroleum Institute
- Virginia Polytechnic Institute and State University, official name of Virginia Tech, a US university
- Visegrad Patent Institute, a patent organization created by the four Visegrad countries
- VPI Industries, a manufacturer of phonographs

== Other uses ==
- Vocational Preference Inventory, by John L. Holland
