= Wilson Benesch =

British audio equipment manufacturer

- Type: Private
- Industry: High-end audio equipment design, manufacture & distribution
- Founded: 1989; 37 years ago in Sheffield, England
- Headquarters: Sheffield, England
- Area served: Worldwide
- Key people: Craig Milnes (Co-owner Design Director); Christina Milnes (Co-owner Managing Director)
- Products: Hi-Fi, home theatre and professional loudspeakers; turntables; Hi-Fi furniture
- Website: www.wilson-benesch.com

Wilson Benesch is a British private company that designs and manufactures hi-fi audio equipment, including loudspeakers and turntables. Wilson Benesch was founded in 1989 in Sheffield, South Yorkshire, England. Wilson Benesch operates its entire design and manufacturing operation from Falcon House. Built in the 1930s, Falcon House is an art-deco styled building in the North-West of Sheffield, the original home of Batchelors.

Wilson Benesch launched its first product in 1991, the Wilson Benesch Turntable, and continues to develop turntables, loudspeakers, furniture, and generators. The company often uses carbon fibre composites and metal alloys in its manufacturing process.

== In-house design and manufacturing ==
Wilson Benesch claims to manufacture nearly 90% of all its product components in-house from raw materials. Design work is completed using Dassault Systèmes’ three-dimensional CAD/CAM software, with the company operating various types of machinery, including CNC machines for metal alloy components and Vacuum Resin Transfer Moulding machinery for producing carbon fibre composite components.

In 2012, Wilson Benesch secured a loan with Finance Yorkshire, who provide seedcorn, loan and equity investments via the UK Government, European Regional Development Fund and European Investment Bank to help businesses grow and develop. The loan enabled Wilson Benesch to expand its manufacturing operations and begin end-to-end production of its new reference loudspeaker, the Cardinal.

== Technology, research and development ==
Research and development (R&D) has been central to the development of Wilson Benesch. From the outset, finance and subsequent earnings from sales of the initial products were invested in new product development.

In addition, Wilson Benesch has secured funding through grant applications to His Majesty's Government for innovative, high-risk, research and development projects. These projects have drawn on collaborative partnerships with scientists in a number of fields and from a number of universities, including, University of Leeds, University of Oxford, University of Sheffield and Sheffield Hallam University, as well as other technology companies and institutes such as the Advanced Manufacturing Park and Hypetex. Since its foundation, Wilson Benesch has been successful in six separate grant funding applications, accounting for more than £600,000 of publicly funded research and development. These programs have often been conducted by the company as part of a match funded agreement, with Wilson Benesch committing as much as 50% of the total R&D budget.

Noteworthy innovations resulting directly from grant funded research:

- In 1989, Wilson Benesch was awarded its first grant. The application focused on plans to develop a new turntable that would use new materials technology to advance performance. £25,000 was awarded to Wilson Benesch by the Department for Trade and Industry (DTi) under the SMART Award scheme designed to fund innovation. The direct outcome of the SMART Award funding was the company's first two products, the Wilson Benesch Turntable and the A.C.T. One Tonearm. The Wilson Benesch Turntable featured an advanced composite sub-chassis, constructed from a Nomex core with a carbon fibre skin. The A.C.T. One Tonearm was constructed from carbon fibre composite in a hyperbolic tube.
- In 1997, Wilson Benesch was awarded a second DTi Grant under the SMART Award scheme. Wilson Benesch was awarded £250,000 for an application that outlined a proposal to develop another dynamic drive unit based around materials technology previously not used in drive unit design. The project was code named 'The Bishop Project' by Wilson Benesch. The outcome was the company's Tactic Multirole Drive Unit. The drive unit features a Neodymium Rare Earth Magnet and an Isotactic Polypropylene cone that was developed through collaborative research with the University of Leeds and Professor Ian Ward. The first product which used this drive technology was the Bishop loudspeaker in 1999. The drive technology was also subsequently used in the company's Odyssey Range and the Square Series.
- In 2003, Wilson Benesch was awarded its third DTi Grant under the SMART Award scheme. Wilson Benesch was awarded £186,000 for an application that outlined the development of a patentable drive unit design, capable of reproducing low frequency sound. The outcome was the company's Torus Infrasonic Generator. Wilson Benesch patented the design, electing to name it according to the designs unique motor design which has no spider to reset the drive unit cone to its resting position, instead the design introduced a new approach that used a push-pull drive design, with the resting position of the cone being determined by two electromagnets.
- In 2008, Wilson Benesch won its fourth DTi Grant under the SMART Award scheme. Wilson Benesch was awarded £146,000 for an application that outlined the development of a patentable analogue replay system. The company entitled the research and development project, the Mondrian Project, and have published a number of project reports, but has announced no outcomes or products directly from the research project to date.
- 2009 SMART grant funding of £156,000 to develop nested tube cable. The design is a patented design.
- Horizon 2020 EU grant 2017 −2021 SSUCHY brought together 17 European partners. The project was accomplished after being extended six months beyond the original 48 months, from September 2017 to August 2021, with a total budget of €7 411 150, including €4 457 195 of BBI JU contribution. Wilson Benesch commercialised its development outcomes in a new generation of loudspeakers called Fibonacci Series which superseded the Geometry Series Wilson Benesch secured £320,000 grant funding to develop the world's first bio composite monocoque
- GMT Consortium. IUK Funding At the close of 2020, Wilson Benesch brought together a consortium that successfully won £327,000 of Innovate UK funding. The consortium was composed of Sheffield Hallam University – Dr F. Al-Naemi, Dr J. Travis and Professor G. Cockerham. These scientists have enabled the most nuanced and sophisticated modelling to be accomplished using state of the art 3D software and have been critical to the success of the project. Secondly, the highly innovative CAAS Audio, which is also based in South Yorkshire and is driven by the proven world-class expertise of Dr C. Broomfield and N. Broomfield. Since winning this essential funding, the consortium has pioneered a completely new motor and dedicated poly-phase motor power supply system. The Omega Drive and Alpha Power Supply is a patented applied for design. The GMT was launched in May 2022 and first production will be available in Q1 of the companies 35th Anniversary year. Wilson Benesch has only ever produced 3 turntable systems. All three designs have adopted all of the full system approach of turntable, tone arm cartridge, support furniture and first stage amplification being conceived as a whole as opposed to an assemblage of discrete designs being assembled together to create the whole.

== Carbon fibre and carbon nanotube composite technology ==
Since Wilson Benesch was founded in 1989, the company has consistently developed audio products based around the innovative application of carbon fibre composite materials technology. Wilson Benesch uses carbon fibre composite materials technology to extract the unique stiffness and damping properties of the material. The composite material proved to provide high specific stiffness and internal damping, minimising distortion. Wilson Benesch often use geometric forms within the design of composite structures to optimise this stiffness, often reducing the weight of the component in the process and reducing the number of flat surfaces in the finished product that can create problems with distortion and standing waves.

Noteworthy carbon composite innovations and introductions to the audio industry:

- In the 1990s, the company's first three products, the Wilson Benesch Turntable, the A.C.T. One Tonearm and the A.C.T. One Loudspeaker, were developed through collaboration with carbon composites engineer Neil Humpston, who had been part of the team that helped develop the Rolls-Royce RB-211 Jet Engine carbon composite fan blades. Each of these products featured an innovative carbon fibre composite component.
- In the 2000s, Wilson Benesch worked with Pera Technology in Melton Mowbray to develop a new carbon fibre composite component using resin transfer moulding technology. The direct result was an innovative loudspeaker cabinet, constructed from carbon fibre composite, moulded into a curved u-section monocoque. Wilson Benesch named this component the Advanced Composite Technology (A.C.T.) Monocoque. The first product line to be manufactured by Wilson Benesch using this component was the Odyssey Range, which was announced with the launch of the Discovery loudspeaker in 2001.
- In 2006, Wilson Benesch announced the Torus Infrasonic Generator. The Torus features an 18" carbon fibre – polyethylene terephthalate cone formed from an innovative fabric weave allowing multi-axis layup of the material.
- In 2007, Wilson Benesch undertook a collaborative research project with Sheffield Hallam University with the aim of introducing carbon nanotechnology into the company's manufacturing process. In 2008, Wilson Benesch announced the Nanotube One tonearm. The company claims that this was the first tonearm in the world to be constructed from a carbon fibre – nanotube matrix.
- In 2014, Wilson Benesch announced another carbon fibre – nanotube composite component. Wilson Benesch named the technology a 'Carbon-Nanotech Enclosure'. The Carbon-Nanotech Enclosure was developed through a collaborative research project with the Advanced Manufacturing Research Centre in Sheffield. The company states that the component bestows numerous performance benefits, principally optimising air volume within the loudspeaker cabinet and managing energy generated inside the loudspeaker cabinet.
- In 2016, Wilson Benesch announced the introduction of the world's first loudspeaker constructed from coloured carbon fibre, with the launch of the A.C.T. One Evolution P1 loudspeaker at the Munich HIGH END audio exhibition. The loudspeaker has been built in partnership with Hypetex, a British company who have developed a patented manufacturing process for coloured carbon fibre manufacturing.

== Proprietary drive technology ==
Wilson Benesch developed its first drive technology in house through the Bishop Project, resulting in the Tactic Multirole Drive Unit. The Tactic Drive Unit allowed Wilson Benesch to use the same drive unit for its midrange and bass drive units. In addition the Wilson Benesch introduced an unusual adaptation of the Isobaric loudspeaker configuration in the Bishop loudspeaker in 1999. The design featured two Tactic Drive Units in a clamshell or push-pull formation, the external drive unit has its rear magnet outside the cabinet. Wilson Benesch called this formation the Isobaric Drive System.

Since the Tactic Drive Unit, Wilson Benesch has introduced the Wide Bandwidth One drive unit, with the launch of the Wide Bandwidth Collection in 2007. Following this the Tactic II drive unit, which the company refers to as the third iteration of the original Tactic.

Wilson Benesch has also developed its own tweeter technology for reproduction of high frequency sound. The company introduced its tweeter with the launch of its current reference loudspeaker line, the Geometry Series. It calls the tweeter the Semisphere Tweeter.

== Products ==
=== Geometry Series ===
The company's reference loudspeaker line. Features the company's latest drive unit technology and all the designs are based upon metal alloy and carbon fibre composite material construction. The series consists of, Vertex, Vector, Fulcrum, Discovery II, A.C.T. One Evolution, Endeavour and the flagship of the series, the Cardinal. The Torus Infrasonic Generator was brought into this product line in 2016.

=== Square series II ===
The Square Series II is constructed from more traditional wood based materials technology and rectilinear forms. The series incorporates drive technology from the Odyssey Series. The series consists of, Square One, Square Two, Square Three, Square Centre and the flagship of the series, the Square Five.

=== Analogue collection ===
Wilson Benesch's oldest product line, incorporating all analogue replay systems including turntables and tonearms. The series consists of Circle 25 Turntable, A.C.T. 25 Tonearm, Nanotube One Tonearm.

=== Hi-Fi Furniture ===
Wilson Benesch currently manufactures a Hi-Fi rack called the R1 Hi-Fi Rack.

== See also ==
- List of phonograph manufacturers
