= Clearaudio Electronic =

German audio products manufacturer

Clearaudio Electronic GmBH
- Type: private limited company
- Industry: Manufacture audio equipment
- Founded: 1978
- Headquarters: Erlangen, Germany
- Key people: Peter Suchy and sons Robert & Patrick
- Products: Hi-fi equipment, Turntables
- Website: https://www.clearaudio.de

Clear Audio Electronic GmbH of Germany is a manufacturer of high fidelity audio products. Formed in 1978, their primary focus is on vinyl turntables and related products such as cartridges. One of the particularly recognisable traits of a Clearaudio turntable are their transparent (or in some models translucent) acrylic components. The more expensive turntables showcase parallel tracking rather than pivot based tone arms.

== Product Lines ==
- Turntables
- Tonearms
- Cartridges
- Amplifiers
- Cables
- Record Cleaning Devices

== See also ==
- List of phonograph manufacturers
