= Garrard Engineering and Manufacturing Company =

British turntable manufacturer

- Industry: Electronics
- Founded: 1915; 111 years ago
- Headquarters: Swindon, United Kingdom,
- Products: turntables
- Parent: Plessey (1960-1978); Gradiente (1979-1992); Loricraft Audio (1997-2018); Cadence Audio SA (2018-current)
- Website: https://garrardturntables.co.uk

The Garrard Engineering and Manufacturing Company of Swindon, Wiltshire, was a British company that was famous for producing high-quality gramophone turntables. It was formed by the jewellers Garrard & Co in 1915. The company was sold to Plessey, an electronics conglomerate, in 1960. During the period 1976-1978, Garrard developed demonstrators of the novel video disc technology. Although the team recognised the future potential of this data storage technology, Plessey chose not to invest. After several years in decline, Garrard was sold by Plessey to Gradiente Electronics of Brazil in 1979 and series production was moved to Brazil (Manaus). The remaining Garrard research and development operation in Swindon was reduced to a skeleton operation until 1992. Then, Gradiente licensed the Garrard name to Terence O'Sullivan, who operated as Loricraft Audio, in 1997.

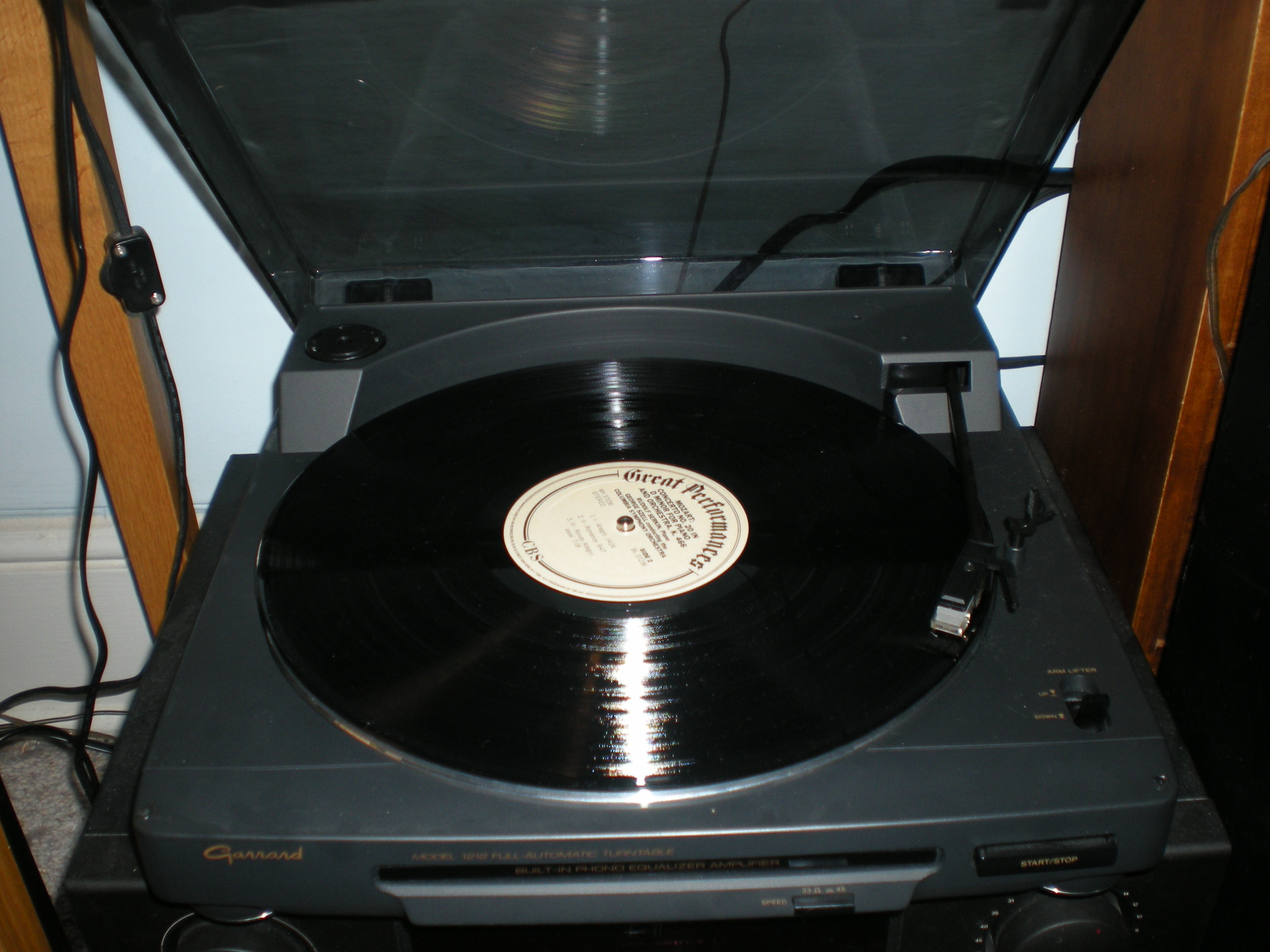
A Garrard turntable, Model 1212

Between 1992 and 1997, the Garrard brand name was licensed to other companies in the US, which imported electronic items built by different, unrelated Far Eastern manufacturers. These included "Garrard" branded cassette decks, CD players, stereo receivers, portable radio/cassette players, portable "Walkman" type cassette players, serial-port printer cables, universal TV/audio remote controls, and other miscellany, including turntables that had no connection with any original Garrard design.

In 2018, Cadence Audio SA, which also owns the British turntable and tonearm manufacturer SME Limited, took ownership of the Garrard brand and registered trademarks when it purchased Loricraft Audio Ltd. The business was restructured to run under the name of Garrard Turntables UK Ltd.

== The Garrard 301 and 401 Transcription Turntables ==
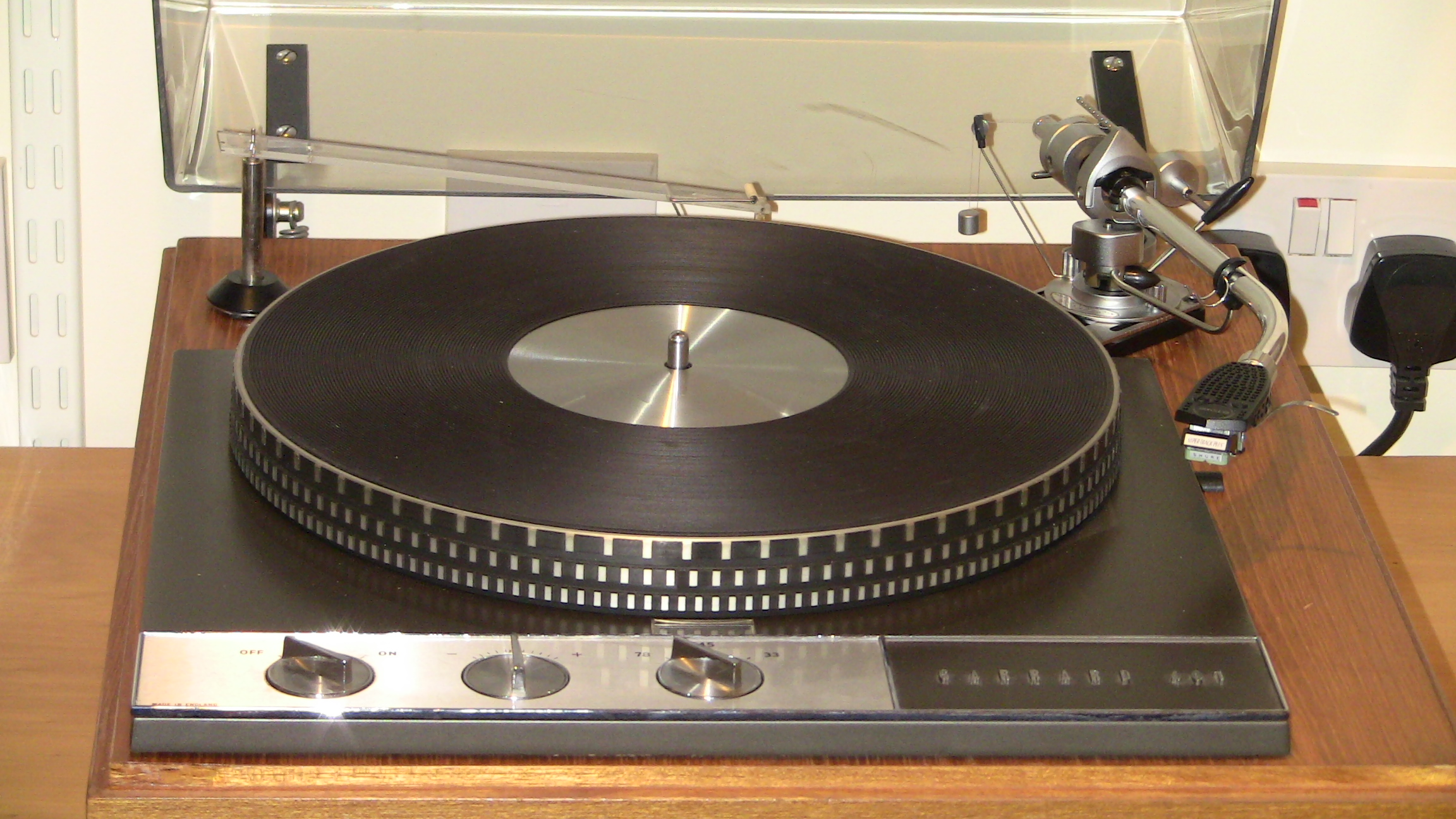
Garrard 401 turntable with SME 3009 tonearm.

The Garrard 301 Transcription Turntable was the first transcription turntable that supported all extant commercial playback formats – the 33, 45 and 78 rpm records of the time. The first model was the Garrard 301. Oil and grease bearing versions were made. The later 401 was nearly identical mechanically, but with a redesigned exterior, more powerful motor, slightly different eddy current braking speed control and different turntable thrust bearing. Both models were used by the BBC and in commercial radio stations, mostly in Europe. The 301 and to a lesser extent the 401 were also exported. Production of the 301 started in 1953 and sales were launched in 1954. The 401 was introduced in 1965 and produced until 1976.

== See also ==
- List of phonograph manufacturers
- Record changer
