= Gemini Sound =

American electronics company

- International Corporate Logo
- Company type: Private
- Industry: Audio equipment manufacturing
- Founded: 1974; 51 years ago in Edison, New Jersey, United States
- Founder: Ike Cabasso
- Headquarters: Edison, New Jersey, United States
- Parent: GCI Technologies
- Website: geminisound.com

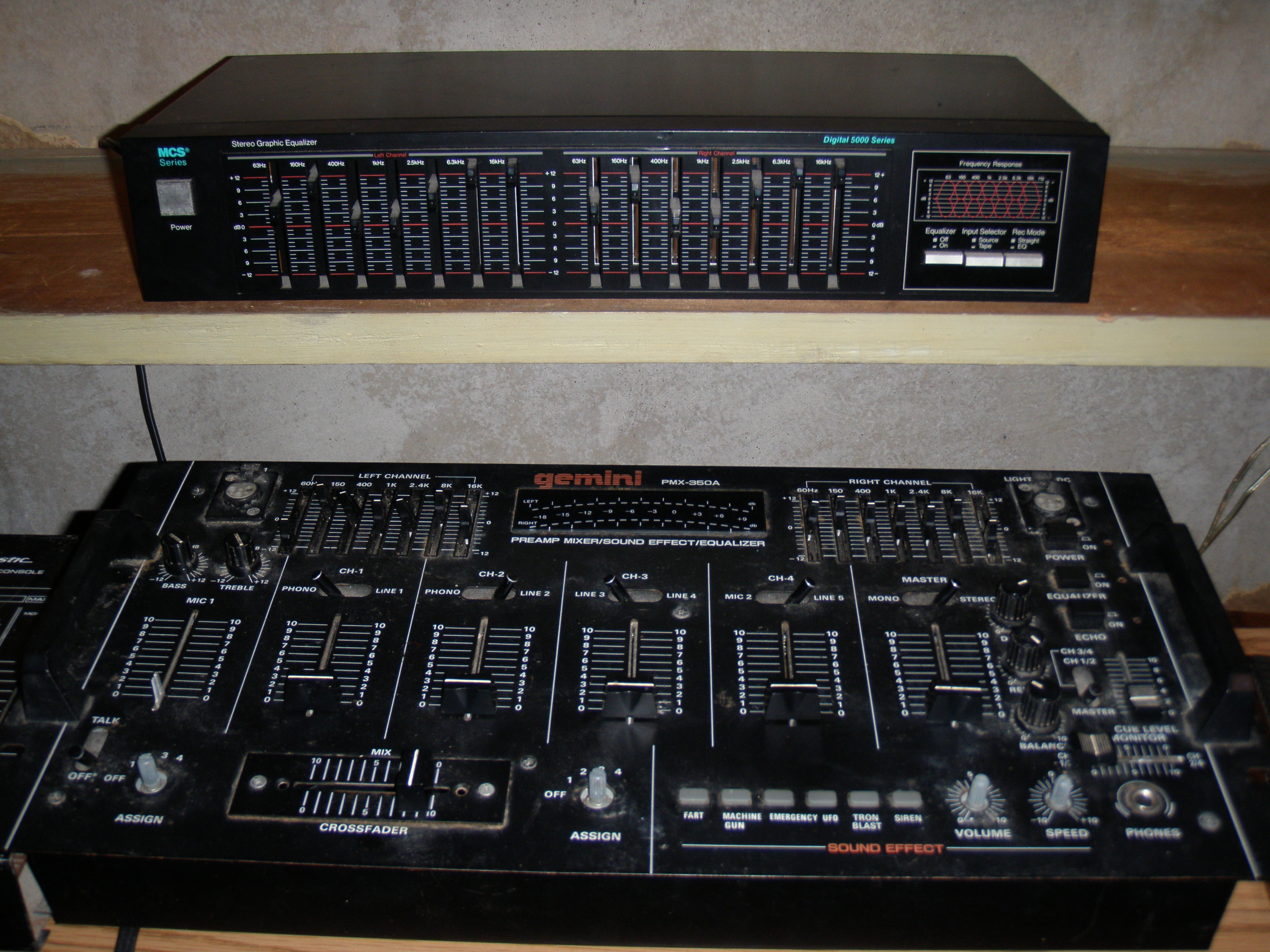
Gemini mixing console and graphic equalizer

Gemini Sound is a manufacturer of professional audio and mobile DJ equipment, including DJ CD players, DJ turntables, DJ mixers, professional amplifiers, loudspeakers, wireless microphones & DJ audio effects. Founded in 1974, the company is based in New Jersey, USA.

In June 2006, it announced the corporate name would change to GCI Technologies, an acronym meaning Gemini, Cortex, and iKey, its three divisions. Cortex, an offshoot of the Gemini brand which was working exclusively on mass-storage based controllers with embedded systems, made its debut in 2006. The Gemini DJ brand name is the most used brand of GCI Technologies.

== See also ==
- List of phonograph manufacturers
