= U-Turn Audio =

American audio equipment manufacturer in Woburn, Massachusetts

- Company type: Private
- Industry: Electronics
- Founded: October 10, 2012
- Founder: Benjamin Carter, Robert Hertig, Peter Maltzan
- Headquarters: Woburn, Massachusetts, United States
- Area served: United States, Canada
- Products: Audio equipment
- Website: https://uturnaudio.com/

U-Turn Audio is an American audio equipment manufacturer located in Woburn, Massachusetts. The company was established in 2012 by Benjamin Carter, Robert Hertig, and Peter Maltzan. Its primary products are turntables, phono preamps, and loudspeakers.

== History ==
U-Turn Audio was established in 2012 by three friends from Lexington High School, Benjamin Carter, Robert Hertig, and Peter Maltzan. They raised money to start the company by participating in a business incubator program at Northeastern University, and they successfully completed a Kickstarter crowdfunding campaign to build the first Orbit turntable prototype and begin manufacturing operations.

U-Turn's initial product line consisted of two products: the Orbit Basic turntable, with a platter made of MDF, and the Orbit Plus turntable, with a platter made of acrylic. Both models were equipped with a unipivot tonearm designed in-house and pre-fitted with an Ortofon magnetic cartridge. The plinth, or base, of the turntable was also made of MDF and was offered in a choice of three colors: black, blue, or green. The Basic model was priced at $179 and the Plus model was priced at $279. Magnetic cartridges from Audio-Technica and Grado Labs were offered as build-to-order options.

All Orbit turntables utilize a belt-drive system that uses a low voltage AC synchronous drive motor positioned at the left rear corner of the plinth, and a rubber drive belt wrapped around the motor pulley and the outer edge of the platter. Playback speeds of 33.3 RPM and 45 RPM are selected by positioning the drive belt on one of two sections of the drive motor pulley.

In 2015, U-Turn introduced the Pluto phono preamp, available in external and internal versions. Two more Orbit plinth colors — red and white — were offered that year.

In 2016, the company began production of the Orbit Special turntable, offering customers two new plinth choices: solid maple wood and solid walnut wood. Later that year, U-Turn announced that a new tonearm, called Orbit Arm 2, would replace the company's original tonearm. Orbit Arm 2 uses a gimbal bearing rather than a unipivot bearing, and includes a new and improved anti-skating mechanism.

In 2019, U-Turn introduced a new Orbit plinth color, purple, which the company stated would be available only for a limited time, but it has remained part of the regular product line ever since.

In 2020, the company announced that an improved phono preamp, called Pluto 2, would replace the original Pluto preamp. The Orbit Special turntable gained an additional plinth choice that year: birch plywood with maple wood veneer.

In April 2021, U-Turn announced that it had built 100,000 turntables, and that the most popular plinth color was black. In November of that year, the company began producing the Ethos self-powered loudspeaker. The loudspeakers use custom-designed four-inch woofers and one-inch tweeters, housed inside MDF cabinets, available in white or black (priced at $399), or in walnut wood veneer (priced at $499). They are powered by an internal audio amplifier rated at 80 watts, and can receive audio input signals via wired connections or wireless Bluetooth connections.

== Products ==
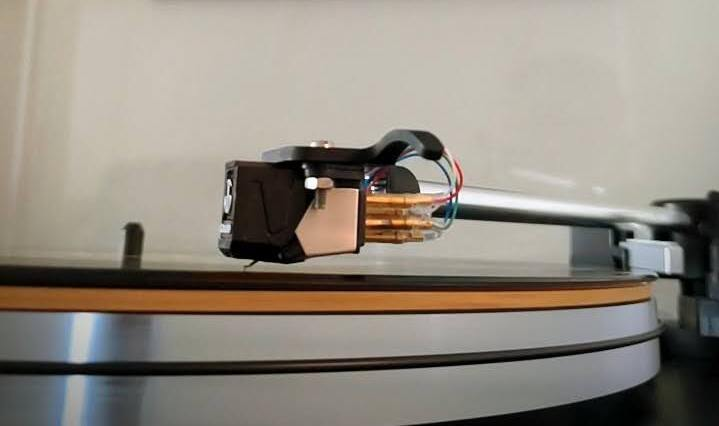
U-Turn Audio Orbit Custom turntable with a Grado Blue 1 cartridge, playing Saxophone Colossus by Sonny Rollins

All U-Turn Audio products are manufactured and assembled by hand at the company's factory in Woburn, Massachusetts and come with a three year warranty against defects in materials and workmanship. Most of the parts and components come from American suppliers. The company sells and distributes its products in the United States and Canada.

=== Turntables ===
- Orbit Basic
  - Entry-level turntable with MDF platter and Audio-Technica AT91B phono cartridge
- Orbit Plus
  - Mid-level turntable with acrylic platter and Ortofon OM5E phono cartridge
- Orbit Special
  - High-end turntable with solid wood plinth, acrylic platter, and Ortofon 2M Red phono cartridge
- Orbit Custom
  - Built-to-order turntable; customers choose their own combination of plinth material, platter material, and phono cartridge. As of 2022, available cartridges are Audio-Technica AT91B, Grado Prestige Black3, Ortofon OM5E, Ortofon 2M Red, and Ortofon 2M Blue.

=== Phono preamps ===
- Pluto (discontinued)
- Pluto 2
  - All Pluto preamps are available in internal or external versions. The internal version is only available when ordering an Orbit turntable. The external versions are available in black or silver enclosures.

=== Loudspeakers ===
- Ethos
  - Available in painted cabinets (choice of black or white) or walnut wood veneered cabinets, with or without detachable grills
