= Collaro =

Collaro was the name of a major early British manufacturer of gramophones, record players, and tape decks, throughout the early years of sound reproduction.

Collaro Ltd was founded in 1920 by Christopher Collaro at 23 Garway Road, London, and became a private company in 1924. The company moved to the Culmore Works, Culmore Road, Peckham, London in 1926.

During World War II the company was engaged in munitions work and temporarily relocated to the Valley Works, Langley Mill, Derbyshire when its London factory was bombed.

In 1948 the company moved to the Ripple Works, By-Pass Road, Barking, Essex.

In 1961 it was described as the largest manufacturers of record changers in the United Kingdom, and also manufactured fan heaters. In 1960 it was reported in US publication 'Billboard' that the President of the American Magnavox corporation, Frank Freimann had announced the 'acquisition' of Collaro, along with managing director of Collaro, Isaac Wolfson. However, he is also reported as noting that "the linking of the two firms carries not only product but distribution ramifications," which suggests some sort of cooperative alliance with acquisition of selling rights rather than a total 'buy-out'. Isaac Wolfson, a major British industrialist, was at the time also the head of Great Universal Stores, a large chain of retail outlets throughout Britain, Continental Europe, and the British Empire, suggesting perhaps that an earlier link-up took place between Wolfson and the originators of Collaro. The record decks comprised the mechanical unit incorporating a turntable and pickup, without electronics, and were built into many manufactured and home-constructed record players of the time. Magnavox were acquired by Philips in 1974.

The Collaro Transcriptor, and Collaro Studio were tape decks (mechanisms without associated electronics) that were incorporated into many home tape recorders at the time. Unlike some other makes of deck, they accommodated 7-inch tape reels, rather than 5.75-inch, giving longer playing time, and had three speeds selectable up to 7.5 inches/second.

== See also ==
- List of phonograph manufacturers
