= IKey =

iKey, LTD, also known as iKey Industrial Peripherals, is an Austin, Texas-based manufacturer of rugged computer keyboards, mice and other peripherals. The company was founded in 1989 and currently works with several Fortune 500 companies. The company was formerly known as Texas Industrial Peripherals.

== Products ==
iKey’s core product line includes specially sealed keyboards in either stainless steel or ABS polycarbonate cases, most of which have silicon keypads. The devices are either wireless or connect via USB or PS2 cables.

The company also has China manufacture custom products for industrial, medical, and public safety customers. Common options for custom projects include metal keys, backlighting, and variable key layouts. Often, iKey keyboards are incorporated into mobile computer systems using Ram Mounts, rack mounts, and other mounting systems.

iKey's medical keyboards have demonstrated the ability to prevent cross-contamination of bacteria and viruses.

== Product certifications ==
- NEMA 4, 4X
- UL-1950
- CE
- Factory Mutual: Intrinsically safe (IS), Non-incendive (NI)
- FCC Class 15, Part B
- RoHS
- WEEE
- China RoHS
- D-Mark

== International presence ==
iKey products are sold in over one hundred countries, either directly by iKey or through distributors, resellers, system integrators, and others.

The keyboards are built in seventeen different language layouts including American English, Arabic, Cyrillic, Danish, Finnish, French, French Canadian, German, Italian, Japanese, Korean, Norwegian, Spanish, Swedish, Swiss, Turkish, and UK English.
