= Musical Fidelity =

British producer of high-end audio equipment

- Type: High-end audio manufacturer
- Industry: Electronics
- Founded: 1982
- Headquarters: London, United Kingdom
- Key people: Antony Michaelson, CEO
- Products: Hi-fi equipment
- Website: http://www.musicalfidelity.com/

Musical Fidelity is a British producer of hi-fi audio equipment focusing on streaming music players, and its core product range of amplifiers of various types (power, phono, headphone, integrated and pre-amplifiers). Other products have included headphones, digital-to-analog converters (DACs), CD players, Bluetooth receivers, ‘all-in-one systems’ (including Phono turntable). Founded in the United Kingdom in 1982, they are known for their unusual industrial design, Nuvistor tube use and Class-AB amplifiers.

== History ==
Musical Fidelity was founded in 1982 by Antony Michaelson, a clarinettist and hi-fi enthusiast, following his exit from Michaelson & Austin, a predecessor company of which he was a partner.

Musical Fidelity's first product was "The Preamp", which incorporated moving coil and moving magnet pre-amplification and a single line-level ‘Tuner’ input. This was originally designed to overcome his dissatisfaction with the Michaelson & Austin TVP-1 pre- amplifier. The first batch of “The Preamp” were made on Michaelson's home kitchen table and sold out almost at once through a local dealer. The dealer asked for more product, which resulted in Michaelson making the decision to go into full-time production.

This was followed by the ‘Dr Thomas’ power amplifier, designed by Dr Martin Vaughan Thomas, capable of outputting 100-plus watts. Later products included the Preamp II, and the Typhoon Power amplifier.

== Significant products ==
Musical Fidelity is probably best known for its A1 integrated amplifier, a Class AB amplifier, rated at 25W per channel. These utilised a bias level and casework configuration that led to excessive heat generation, leading to habitual failures, of both mains transformers and (85 DegC rated) electrolytic capacitors. The manufacturer's marketing material claimed that the unit produced "...a very sweet, authentic sound, reminiscent of tube amplifiers." This was launched in 1985 and sold over 100,000 units over its lifetime.

In 1986, the A370 power amplifier was launched – at that time unusual (in the UK) for being a rack-mountable domestic amplifier. It produced 185 Watts per channel. These were the first of their type to be made by a UK hi-fi company. Then followed a range of well received loudspeakers, the MC series (designed by Martin Colloms) and the Reference series, featuring 'TPX' polypropylene drivers.

A year later, the Digilog was launched, one of the first stand-alone production DACs.

In the late 1980s Musical Fidelity introduced further amplifiers, including the P170 and high-powered rack mount style amplifiers, including the P270, A370 (all featuring Hitachi lateral MOSFETs) and the SA470, SA570. In the early nineties, Musical Fidelity released the P180, with CRPS (Choke Regulated Power Supply). This was possibly the first time bifilar wound coils had been combined with transistor electronics. This design innovation helped suppress electro-magnetic radiation frequencies (EMF), reducing the amount of potential noise interference into the audio circuits .

In 1992, the A1000 was launched – one of the first 'super integrated' amplifiers, with a full range of line level inputs coupled to a Class AB power amplifier section producing 50W / channel into 8 ohms. Initially it was only made for Japan but later was well received around the world.

The X series was launched in 1997 consisting of a range of cute extruded cylindrical add-on components, which later spawned the XA series. The units consisted of various amplifiers, Digital-to-analogue converters, Phono stages, tuners and CD players and ancillary power supplies.

The NuVista preamp was introduced in 1997, the first modern, mass-produced audio product using Nuvistor tubes, which were miniature metal-ceramic enclosed vacuum tubes manufactured by RCA . These were followed by power and integrated amplifiers, with ancillary power supplies. Numerous products have descended from it, such as the Tri-Vista 21 ‘Super DAC’, introduced in 2002, culminating in the latest being the NuVista 800.

The kW Pre- and Power Amp was introduced in 2003. The power amplifier was then the highest power audiophile-grade power amp ever made commercially by a UK audiophile company, producing 1 kW of power per channel into 8 ohms. Notably, two mono-blocs and their power supply weighed in at 129 kG. It was followed by the Titan, an upgrade from the kW.

In 2015, the Merlin was released, a multi-format music system that came with a turntable, wireless streaming and a pair of unique speakers, allowing users to play vinyl records and stream digital music over high quality apt-X Bluetooth, in a very compact form factor.

As of 2018 , the products consist of the Nu-Vista, M8, M6, M5si, M3, MX, LX2, and V90 Series as well as the Encore Streaming Music servers. Most of the series provide a mix of Phono stages, integrated amplifiers, DACs, CD players and Headphone amplifiers. The Nu-Vista series continues in the tradition of using a mix of Nuvistor tubes, transistors and Digital technology.

== Musical fidelity CDs ==
Michaelson was a professional clarinettist and on the Musical Fidelity label recorded a number of CDs of major works for the clarinet.

2004 Musical Fidelity CD – Mozart Clarinet Concerto K622 In A Major. Antony Michaelson, Michelangelo Chamber Orchestra, Leader Adrian Levine, Conducted by Robert Bailey

2002 Musical Fidelity CD – Mozart and Brahms Clarinet Quintets. Antony Michaelson, Adrian Levine, Kathy Andrew, Stephen Tees, Judith Serkin

2001 Musical Fidelity CD – Mozart And Brahms Clarinet Trios. Antony Michaelson, Stephen Tees, Andrea Hess, Ingrid Jacoby

2001 Musical Fidelity CD – Brahms Clarinet Sonatas. Antony Michaelson, Ingrid Jacoby

1999 Musical Fidelity CD – Weber Clarinet Quintet / Bärmann 3rd Clarinet Quintet . Antony Michaelson, Beverley Davison, Elizabeth Layton, Roger Chase, Jonathan Williams

1994 Musical Fidelity CD – Mozart Clarinet Quintet, Antony Michaelson, Adrian Levine, Colin Callow, Jeremy Williams, Robert Bailey

== Sonic characteristics of Musical Fidelity products ==
Michaelson stressed that his most important design aim was accuracy and truthfulness to the music. Despite this, Musical Fidelity products generally displayed a sweet, easy going sound quality. Although most reviews identified this quality with MF's products, some did not approve of it.

Michaelson thought that for best results, hi-fi should not need much set-up and tweaking. He strongly disapproved of what he called 'cable madness'. His refusal to accept the prevailing zeitgeist of cable worship frequently landed him in disputes with a variety of hi-fi luminaries. He relished the disagreements. Over time, his view has been borne out by the waning of the market for high-end interconnect and speaker cables sold at very high prices.

== Change of ownership ==
In 2017, Michaelson decided to retire. A search was conducted for a suitable partner to take over the brand name and continue with the heritage. Eventually he came to an agreement with Heinz Lichtenegger of Audio Tuning (also the owner of Pro-Ject and TONE Factory) and on 14 May 2018 they took over the brand and its intellectual property.

== Product range timeline ==
=== 1980s ===
- The Preamp
- The Preamp 2
- Dr. Thomas power amplifier
- Synthesis Integrated
- 3a/3b pre-amp
- MVT
- MVX
- Studio T
- A1 series
- A100 series
- B200 series
- P140(x)
- P150(x)
- P170
- P270
- P180
- A370
- A470
- Digilog
- B1 series
- MC loudspeaker series
- Reference loudspeaker series

=== 1990s ===
- A1000
- F series
- Elektra series
- X series
- XA series
- NuVista series
- Michaelson Audio series

=== 2000s ===
- A3 series
- A5 series
- A308 series
- kW series
- TriVista series
- Kelly Transducers
- M1 turntable
- V series
- Titan

=== 2010s ===
- M1 series
- M3 series
- M5 series
- M6 series
- Quarkie headphones
- Musical Fidelity EB and MF headphone series
- Merlin
- Round Table turntable
- V90 series
- MX series
- LX series
- NuVista series

== See also ==
- List of phonograph manufacturers
