= Transcriptors =

Transcriptors Limited
- Type: Private limited company
- Founded: 1960; 66 years ago
- Headquarters: Wales, United Kingdom
- Key people: David Gammon
- Products: High fidelity equipment
- Website: officialtranscriptors.com

Transcriptors Ltd. is a British manufacturer of high fidelity turntables and tonearms. The company was founded in 1960 by engineer and designer David Gammon. The company's turntables have been featured in several films including A Clockwork Orange, Creepshow, The Look of Love, and X-Men: First Class.

The Hydraulic Reference turntable was recognized by the London Design Centre in 1971, with Gammon receiving the award from Princess Margaret. A Hydraulic Reference turntable produced in 1964 is part of the Museum of Modern Art's Architecture and Design permanent collection.
