= Ortofon =

Danish manufacturer of electronic audio equipment

- Industry: Audio equipment
- Founded: October 9, 1918
- Founders: Axel Petersen; Arnold Poulsen
- Headquarters: Denmark
- Products: Phono cartridges; headshells; record stabilizers
- Number of employees: 75 ±25
- Website: Official website

Ortofon A/S is a Danish manufacturer of electronic audio equipment. It is the world's largest producer of magnetic cartridges for phonograph turntables, with 500,000 cartridges sold annually.

== History ==
=== 1918-1945: Founding and sound film ===
Ortfon was founded in Copenhagen as the Electrical Phono Film Company on 9 October 1918 by Danish engineers Axel Petersen and Arnold Poulsen. Initially focusing on sound film technology, Petersen and Poulsen experimented with synchronizing sound with moving pictures on film.

=== 1946-present: Rebranding to Ortofon ===
Ortofon began to diversify into gramophone record playback and cutting equipment towards the end of World War II. In 1946, the company was renamed to FonoFilm Industry A/S. In April 1947, Ortofon A/S was founded as a trading company under the FonoFilm Industry A/S umbrella.

The firm pioneered the use of moving coil technology in phonograph equipment; the first cutting head based on this technology was introduced in 1945. Ortofon's first moving coil magnetic cartridge, the AB model, was launched in 1948, and similar variations of that product are still manufactured today due to demand from enthusiasts. In 1959, the first Stereo Pick-Up SPU, which aimed at professionals, appeared. This pick-up is produced in different versions until today, for example SPU Meister in 1992, SPU 95th Anniversary in 2015. When Ortofon turned 80 years old, the MC Jubilee was introduced, marking the first time Ortofon used a metal housing manufactured with Metal injection molding. In 2000, on the occasion of the 250th anniversary of the death of the composer Johann Sebastian Bach, an MC-Series "Kontrapunkt" was presented. The models were named b, a, c, and h, wherein the b has a cantilever made of ruby. For the frame of the housing stainless steel was used. Successor of these pickups became the Cadenza-series in 2009. In 2019, a new cantilever appeared, the Anna Diamond, with a cantilever made of diamond.

The first moving magnet-pickup M-15 was launched in 1969; here Ortofon used for the first time the patented Variable Magnetic Shunt (VMS) generating system which was offered until the 1980s. In 1979, Ortofon presented the DJ-pickup Concorde in a new design. In 2007 Ortofon introduced the moving magnet-series 2M. Its design resembles facets of a diamond and was created in collaboration with Moeller Jensen. In 2018, the 2nd generation of the Concorde was released.

DJs currently account for three-quarters of Ortofon's cartridge sales, the remainder being sold for audiophile and consumer audio use. Low-cost Ortofon cartridges, such as the OM-5E, are often supplied as standard on budget-priced consumer turntables, including the Pro-Ject Debut range. The Ortofon OM series stylus assemblies are interchangeable, allowing users to easily mount a more expensive stylus on a cheaper cartridge.

The 2020 presented Revox Studiomaster T700 is delivered with a Quintet Bronze MC.

== Company since 2004 ==
In 2004, the company was taken over by a group of private investors.

Since 2010, Ortofon Microtech has manufactured custom-made high-precision TPE and Technical Rubber components and components for hearing aids. In 2013, Ortofon Microtech was certified for ISO 13485.

In August 2024, The Wall Street Journal recommended Ortofon's cartridge.

== Selection of pickups ==
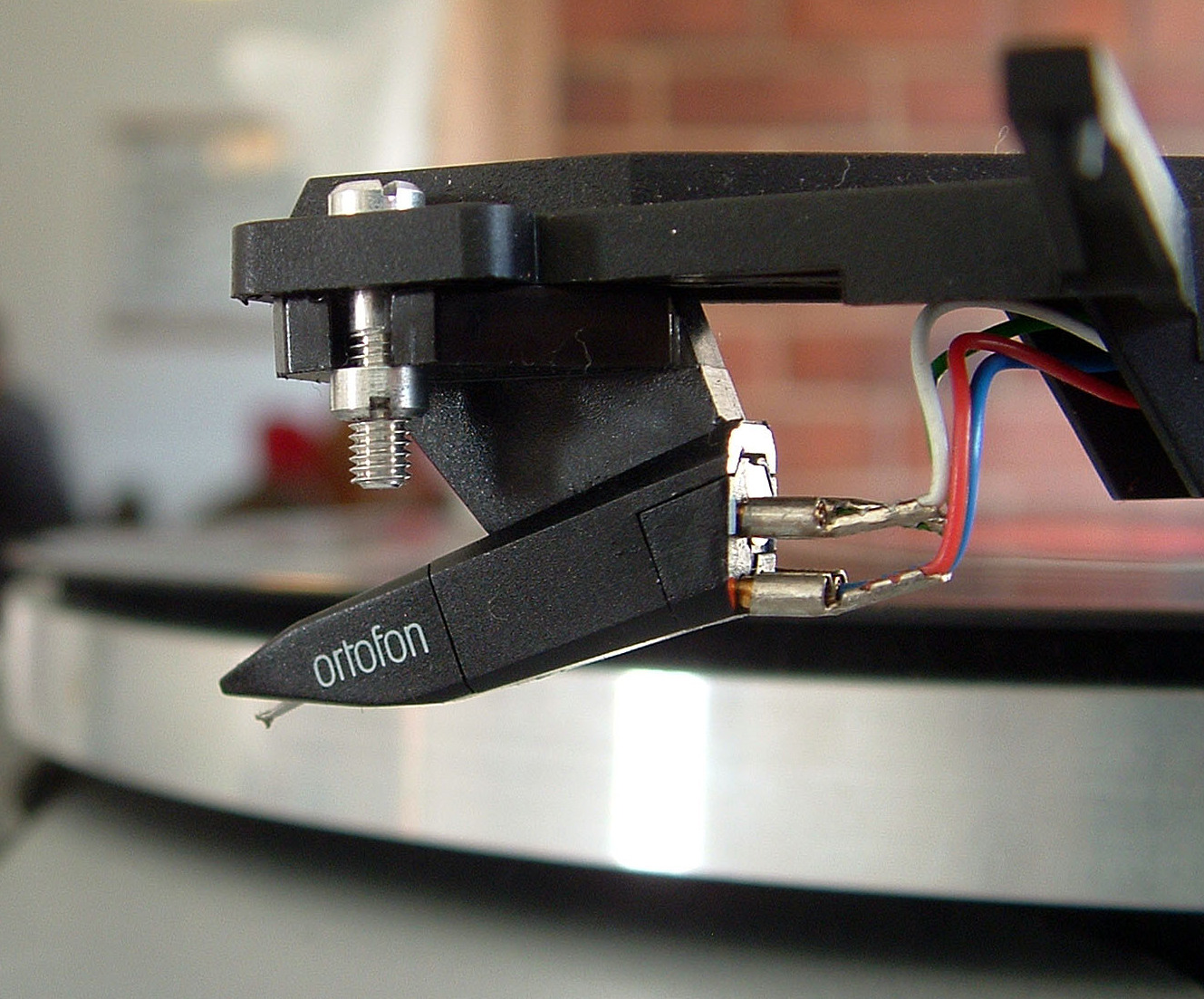
OM-series
(since 1981)

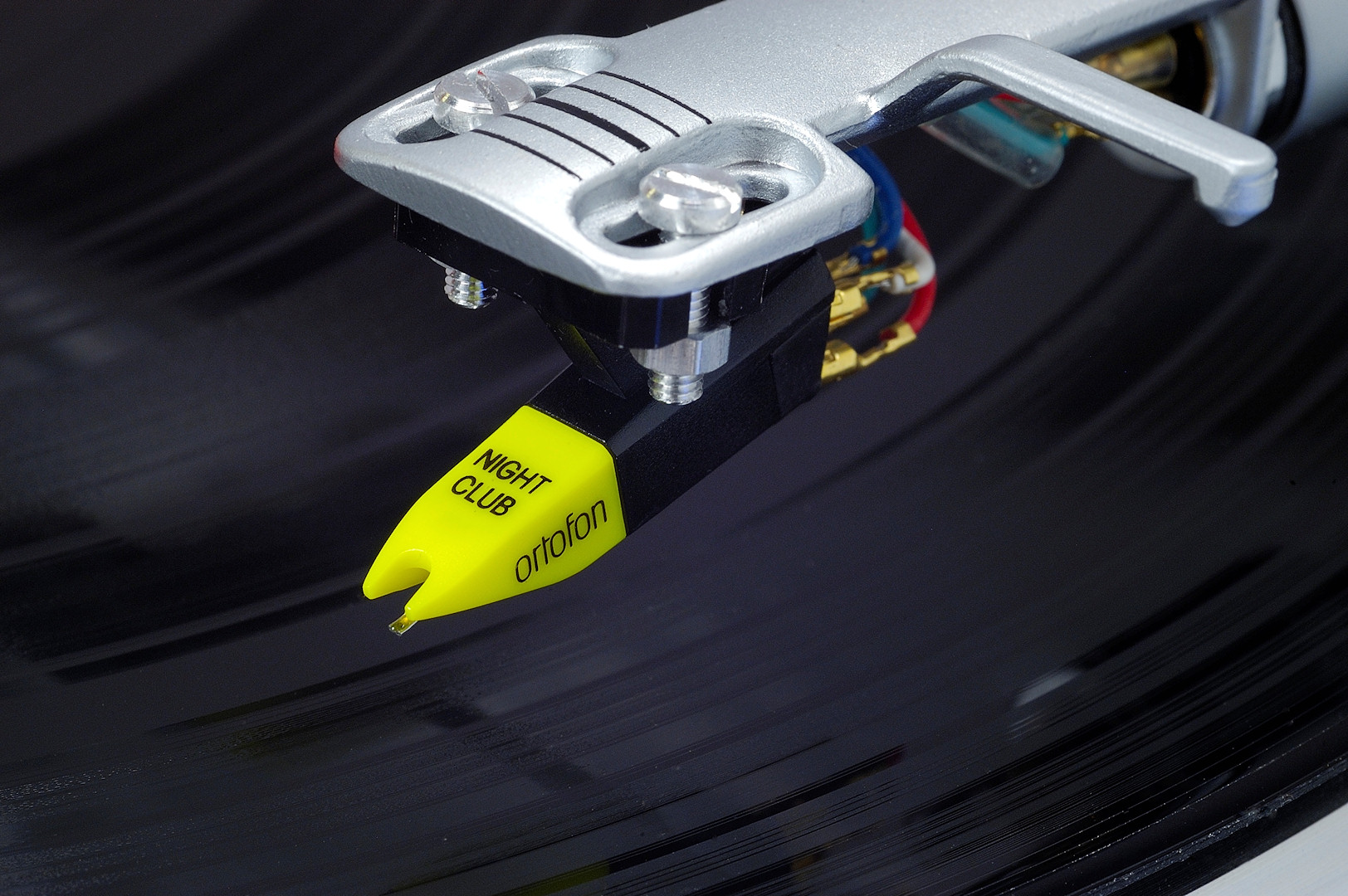
OM-series, here with yellow DJ slide-in

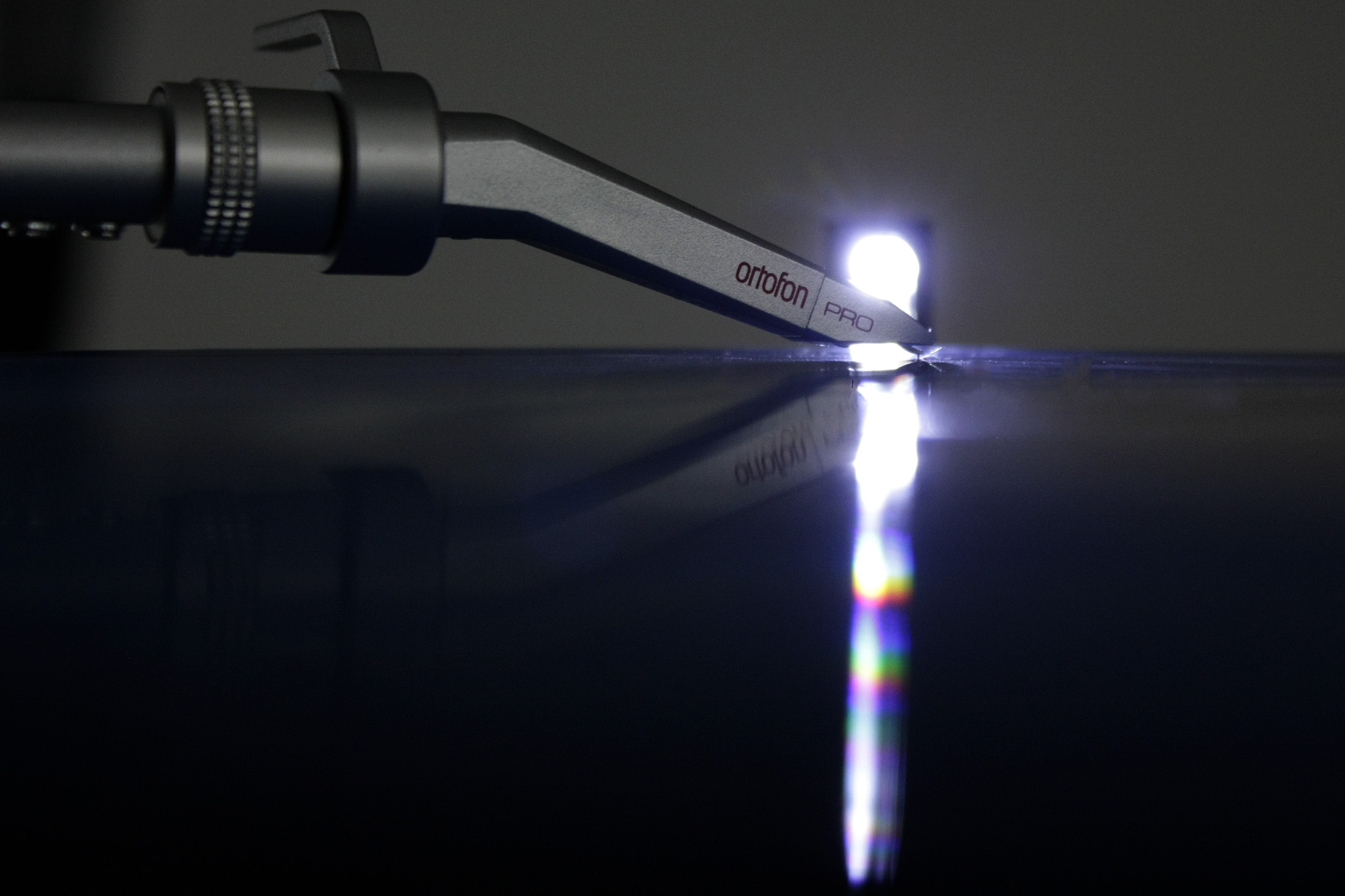
Ortofon Concorde, type Pro

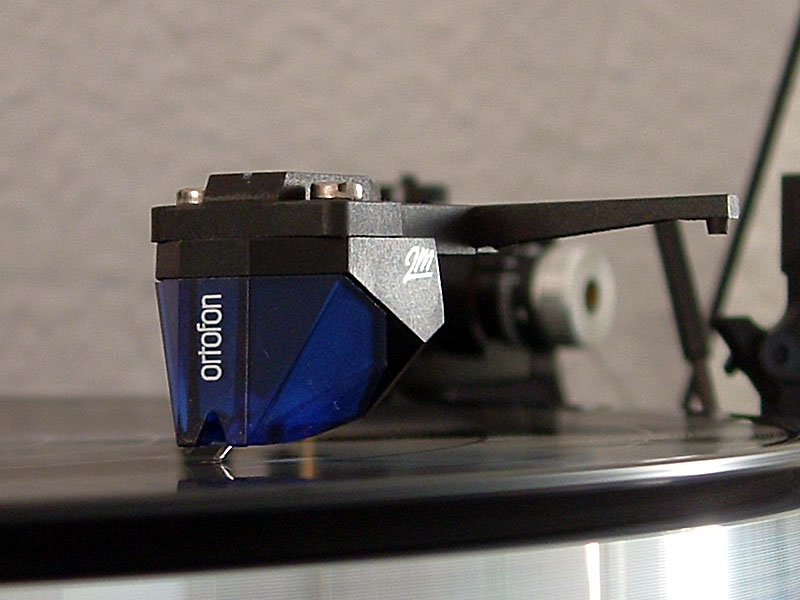
Ortofon 2M, type blue (since 2007)

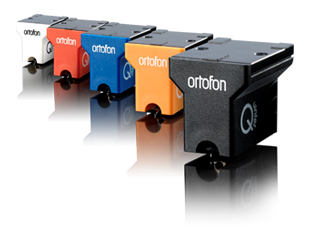
Quintet MC-series
(since 2013)

== See also ==
- List of phonograph manufacturers
