= Abbingdon Music Research =

- Type: Private
- Industry: Audio equipment
- Founded: 2000; 26 years ago
- Headquarters: London
- Website: amr-audio.co.uk

Abbingdon Music Research (AMR) is one of the UK's largest manufacturers of high-end audio systems. While most of their acclaim has come from their amplifiers and CD players (their flagship being the Reference Series System with a price of roughly $100K), they also make phono pre-amplifiers, loudspeakers, cables and accessories.

Founded in 2000, AMR is based in London, United Kingdom. It is a subsidiary of the Abbingdon Global Group.

== History ==
March 2000 – AMR was formed and design work first commenced on the CD-77.

== iFi Audio ==
iFi Audio is a subsidiary of AMR that manufactures high-end audio products: amplifiers, Active Buffer/Preamplifiers, DACs and USB filters.

== See also ==
- List of phonograph manufacturers
