= Pink Triangle (audio manufacturer) =

British audio manufacturer

Pink Triangle Products Ltd
- Type: Private
- Industry: Audio equipment
- Founded: 1979
- Founders: Neal Jackson; Arthur Khoubesserian
- Defunct: 2003
- Headquarters: London, England
- Products: Turntables; Amplifiers; Digital-to-analogue converters; CD transports

Pink Triangle Products Ltd was a British audio manufacturer specialising in high end turntables.

It was founded in London in 1979 by Neal Jackson and Arthur Khoubesserian. Jackson chose the name 'Pink Triangle' after the symbol used to identify homosexuals in Nazi concentration camps (both Jackson and Khoubesserian are gay).

Initial manufacturing took place on an industrial estate in Maidstone Road, Sidcup, Kent, and later at Lomond Grove, Camberwell, London. The company closed in 2003.

Industry magazines are saying Pink Triangle are launching a new turntable at the 2023 Bristol HiFi show.

== History ==
=== Phonograph turntables ===
Very few of the company's first product, referred to as the Pink Triangle Original turntable, were produced. This product and some of the later models included some then very innovative design features. It had an 'aerolam' (a very light and stiff aluminium honeycomb structure developed for and first used by the aircraft industry) sub-chassis that rigidly coupled the platter/bearing assembly with the tone-arm while being low in mass, for low storage of vibrational energy. The wooden plinth was topped with a 3 part mirror glass plate that covered an aluminium frame providing mounting points for the suspension and DC motor. The suspension was unusual in that the subchassis hung from three extension springs rather than sitting on compression springs; a more stable arrangement.

A mains socket mounted transformer/rectifier provided 9V DC to the speed controller board, which used tachometer feedback from the DC motor to regulate its speed. A small brass pulley drove the platter assembly using a flat rubber belt wrapped around a recessed face machined into the underside of the one-piece acrylic platter, another unconventional material chosen for its vibration dissipation qualities. The thrust element of the bearing was formed by a tungsten carbide sphere mounted in the bearing spindle pressing against a synthetic ruby cup in the top of the aluminium support sleeve for the platter. The bearing was positioned close to the centre of gravity of the platter with side load being carried by a lower PTFE sleeve against the bearing spindle.

The next product, referred to as the PT1, is often mistakenly assumed to be their first product. The PT1 was an easier to manufacture version of the 'Original' having the glass top plate replaced by a black painted steel plate. Later versions of the PT1 moved the motor from its original 'one o'clock' position to 'seven o'clock', on the opposite side of the spindle to the tonearm to mount it on the top plate. This turntable was in production from 1979 until 1985.

The PT1 was superseded by the PT TOO, which was also available as a manufacturer upgrade to the PT1, and featured a synchronous AC motor with an external power supply. Their next product was denoted as the Little Pink Thing (LPT), and was designed as their entry-level turntable, based on design principles taken from the PT TOO. Another lower-cost version of the PT-TOO, called the Export, also with the power supply moved into the plinth was released in the late 1980s. The PT TOO was replaced by the PT Anniversary, with much higher build quality, and returned to a glass top plate and a DC motor mounted on a new composite subchassis, along with a new external power supply, some of which featured a rechargeable battery power source topped-up from the mains supply.

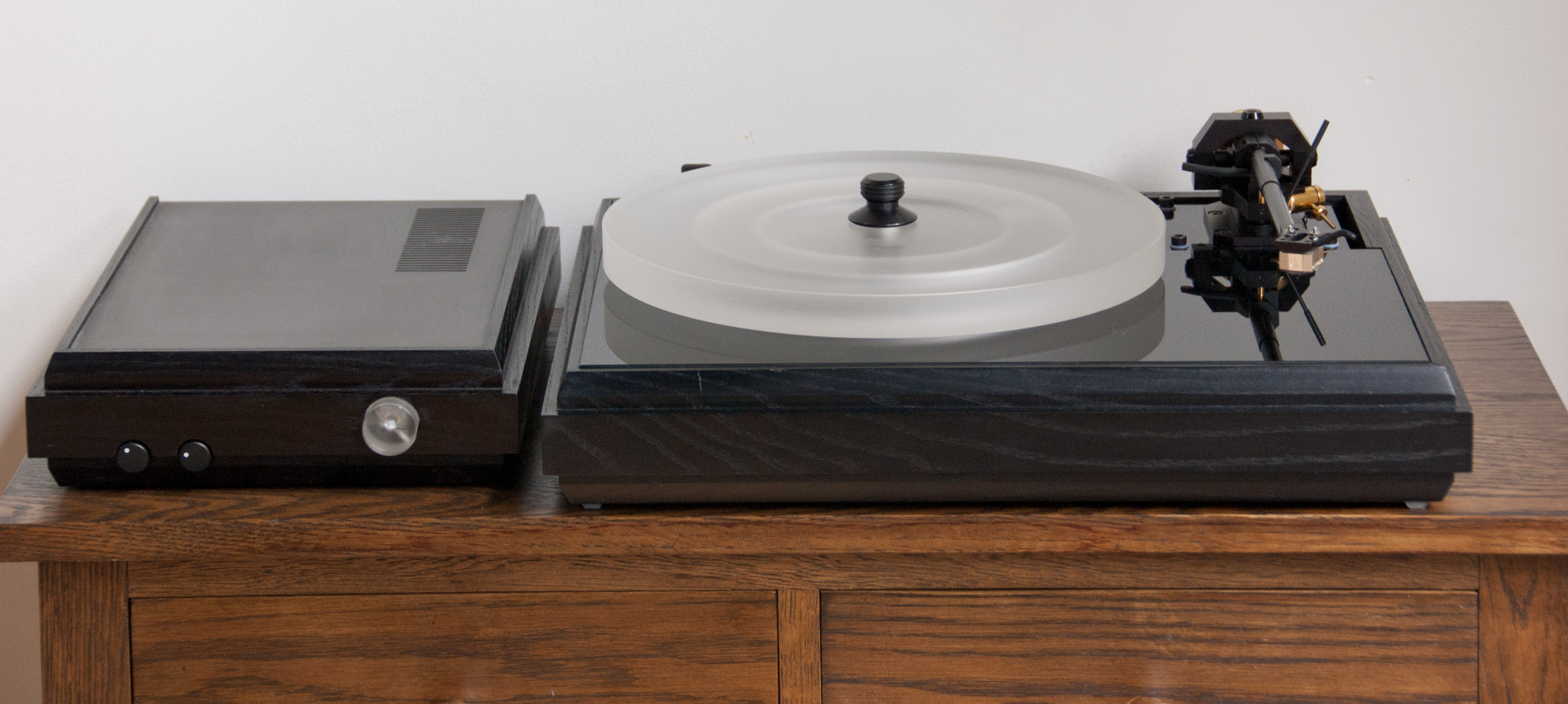
A mains-powered Pink Triangle Anniversary turntable, finished in black ash, with a Helius Orion Mk.1 tonearm and Audio Technica AT32EII moving coil cartridge.

The last Pink Triangle turntable produced was the Tarantella. A complete stylistic departure from the earlier models, its chassis was a triangle of clear acrylic, with three metal spikes supporting it. DC motor and tonearm were mounted on metal outriggers, and the belt drove the periphery of the acrylic platter.

Pink Triangle turntables were highly praised by the audio press and sold in significant quantities. However, they were never as commercially successful as the similarly priced Linn Sondek LP12 they competed with.

=== Other products ===
In later years the company also manufactured amplifiers, digital-analogue converters, and Compact Disc transports, however they did not sell in sufficient numbers to offset their manufacturing and research expenses.

== Successors ==
One of Pink Triangle's founders, Arthur Khoubesserian, founded The Funk Firm in 2005. It produces a range of turntables based on the Pink Triangle philosophy of lightweight, rigid structures with DC motors. A notable innovation common to most of the range is the symmetrical arrangement of motor pulley and two idler pulleys around the subplatter, which eliminates the unbalanced side-load of the belt tension on the platter. The Funk Firm modifications, ironically, became best known for their improvements to the Linn Sondek LP12, Pink Triangle's largest competitor.

== See also ==
- List of phonograph manufacturers
