= VPI Industries =

American audio equipment manufacturer

- Type: Private
- Industry: Consumer electronics
- Founded: 1978
- Founder: Harry and Sheila Weisfeld
- Headquarters: Cliffwood, New Jersey, U.S.
- Products: High-end audio
- Website: vpiindustries.com

VPI Industries Inc. is an American manufacturer of high-end turntables, tonearms and record-care equipment, based in Cliffwood, New Jersey. Founded by Harry and Sheila Weisfeld in the basement of their home in Howard Beach, New York, the company began with record-cleaning machines and other accessories before introducing its first turntable, the HW-19, in 1981, and continued to build turntables through the industry's shift to digital formats. It is now headed by their son Mat Weisfeld, who widened the range with less expensive models and 3D-printed tonearms.

== History ==
=== Foundation and early products ===
Harry and Sheila Weisfeld started the business in the basement of their home in Howard Beach, New York.

The first item Harry Weisfeld manufactured was the HW-9, a base designed to isolate Denon's DP-80 direct-drive turntable from vibration. It was followed by the DB-5, sold as the "Magic Brick" – a block of laminated ferrous metal in a wooden case that the company presented as a sink for stray electromagnetic radiation, and which purchasers placed on top of their amplifiers.

A record-cleaning machine, the HW-16, came next. Its velvet-lipped suction channel was built into the lid and the cabinet had no internal reservoir, so vacuumed fluid drained into the particle board. Art Dudley assembled the first reworked example and wrote about it in The Absolute Sound, after which VPI put the design into production as the HW-16.5, fitted with a spring-loaded nozzle and an internal catch basin. Four decades later, the machine was further developed.

=== HW-19 ===
VPI introduced its first turntable, the HW-19, in 1981, a year before the Sony CDP-101 became the first commercially available CD player; unlike much of the industry, the company went on making turntables through the shift to digital media.

Designed by Harry Weisfeld, the HW-19 was a belt-driven design with a sprung subchassis. Its 10-pound aluminium platter carried a band of lead cemented to the underside to damp ringing, and records were played directly on the bare metal without a mat. The steel-reinforced subchassis, weighing 24 pounds with the parts it carried, sat on foam-filled springs tuned to a resonance of about 5 Hz, while the AC synchronous motor was fixed to the base rather than to the suspended assembly and drove the platter through a neoprene belt. A detachable armboard could be rotated through 180 degrees so that a second hole could be drilled for a different tonearm.

=== Change of leadership ===
While Harry Weisfeld designed the turntables and record cleaners, Sheila Weisfeld handled customer orders and the running of the business, having given up teaching once the company grew. She died of pancreatic cancer in December 2011.

The couple's son Mat Weisfeld, whom his mother had steered towards a teaching career rather than the family firm, represented VPI at the 2012 Consumer Electronics Show, where Stereophile gave the company a Product of the Year award for the Classic III. He took on managerial duties on his return and became president of the company. During the same period Harry Weisfeld withdrew from daily work while continuing to advise on turntable design, and Steve Leung of VAS Industries, a neighbour of the family in New Jersey, took over the wiring of tonearms.

By late 2013 the firm occupied two divisions within a cluster of warehouses in Cliffwood, New Jersey, employing ten people on site, and had acquired a further four units of about 5,000 square feet in the same business park. Shortages of bought-in components had delayed shipments over the preceding two years; in response the company commissioned inventory-tracking software, and after supplies of pumps for the HW-16.5 ran out it developed the MW-1 Cyclone, a pumpless cleaning machine priced at $1,000 that rotates the record from its rim rather than its centre.

== Products ==
The Traveler, priced at $1,399, was shown at the New York Audio & AV Show in April 2012 as a tribute to Sheila Weisfeld. Mat Weisfeld originated the concept and the physical design and Harry Weisfeld executed it; the turntable used an AC synchronous motor built into a compact chassis of Delrin and aluminium, a machined aluminium platter damped with a stainless-steel disc, a bearing assembly rated to carry a 20-pound platter, and a dedicated 10-inch spring-loaded tonearm with a double-gimbal bearing. The model was revised after its first year on the market: gimballed bearings replaced sapphire bearings that could be dislodged when the counterweight was misused, a laser-etched logo replaced the original plaque, a textured paint finish was adopted, and the packaging was improved.

The Nomad, announced in December 2013 at $995, was a simplified derivative of the Traveler with an MDF platter and chassis in place of aluminium parts and a tonearm built without the Traveler's top and bottom bearings. It was supplied with a built-in phono preamplifier, a headphone output, an Ortofon 2M Red cartridge and a pair of Grado Labs iGrado headphones, could be upgraded with Traveler components, and was offered at a 20 per cent discount to buyers who confirmed university enrolment.

The Prime combined a curved MDF chassis reinforced with a steel plate, four feet of Delrin and ball bearings, an outboard motor and a 9-kilogram aluminium platter used without a mat, turning on an inverted bearing with a phosphor bronze bushing and a PEEK thrust disc. It was sold in the United Kingdom for £3,750.

In June 2017, VPI announced the Cliffwood, its first turntable described as entry-level, at $900. The company named it after the town in which its turntables had been built for more than thirty years and stated that, unlike most manufacturers of inexpensive models, it did not source the components abroad. The deck carried a cartridge developed jointly with Grado Labs and a 9-inch machined aluminium gimbal tonearm, and shipped from late July 2017, initially in the United States only.

The company's first direct-drive turntable was the Classic Direct of 2013, which sold for $30,000. It was succeeded in 2020 by the HW-40, offered at $15,000 with a 12-inch JMW-12 "Fatboy" tonearm and produced in an anniversary edition limited to 400 units. Both used a coreless brushless DC electric motor supplied by ThinGap of Ventura, California, adapted for VPI under Mike Bettinger, the company's director of electrical engineering; on the later model the switching power supply was replaced by a linear one built into the chassis. The HW-40 carried an 18-pound machined aluminium platter, monitored rotation with a ring encoder giving 2,460 pulses per revolution, and used a 70-pound plinth with a 0.75-inch aluminium top plate damped with MDF.

=== Tonearms ===
A 3D-printed tonearm was added to the catalogue after Mat Weisfeld took charge of the company. Printed arms were subsequently fitted to the Prime, in unipivot form, and to the HW-40, where the gimbal-bearing Fatboy added an adjustable azimuth and a redesigned vertical tracking angle tower.

== Collaborations ==
VPI developed the cartridge fitted to the Cliffwood turntable together with Grado Labs. In 2017 the company also collaborated with Mark Levinson on the No. 515 turntable, sold for $10,000, or $12,500 with a factory-fitted moving-coil cartridge. Hand-built in the United States, it used a vinyl-wrapped composite and aluminium chassis, feet of machined Delrin and aluminium with a damping polymer core, an inverted bearing with a hardened stainless-steel shaft running in a phosphor bronze bushing, a high-torque AC synchronous motor on a separate isolated chassis, a triple-belt drive with electronic switching between 33 and 45 rpm, and a gimbal-mounted 3D-printed tonearm.

== Reception ==
Stereophile named the Classic III its Product of the Year for 2011. For 2013, the magazine made the Traveler and the Spiral Groove SG1.1 joint Analog Components of the Year, the two models receiving sixteen votes each; the citation contrasted the $31,000 Spiral Groove with the $1,399 VPI, which it characterised as an attempt to bring high-fidelity sound to a wider and younger audience.

In 2015 What Hi-Fi? gave the Prime the first of its Temptation Awards, a category introduced that year for expensive equipment and decided across all the product types the magazine covered. The magazine called the turntable well engineered and good value by the standards of high-end decks, and judged its sound better than that of most alternatives at twice the price.

== See also ==
- List of phonograph manufacturers

== Footnotes ==
=== Periodicals ===
- Day, Rebecca (October 1997), "High End Hi-Fi", Popular Mechanics, 174 (10): 115

=== Websites ===
- VPI Industries Inc. "History of VPI Industries Inc". History. Archived from the original on 20 March 2012.
