= TTUSB =

Belt-driven turntable with a USB interface

Ion TTUSB
- Developer: Ion Audio
- Type: Turntable / Analog-to-digital converter
- Released: c. 2006
- Connectivity: USB, RCA
- Power: AC adapter
- Dimensions: 18 × 14.5 × 6.5 inches
- Weight: 7.7 lb
- Predecessor: Traditional analog turntables
- Related: LP 2 FLASH, Profile LP
- Website: www.ionaudio.com

The Numark TTUSB is a belt-driven turntable with a USB audio interface. This allows the user to transfer music from a record onto a computer, from which it can then be burnt onto an audio CD. Introduced in December 2005, the TTUSB was the first turntable of its kind to have been released to the consumer market. A near-identical model called the iTTUSB was also manufactured under the Ion Audio brand name.

== Product features ==
- Anti-skating control
- 33 1/3 and 45 rpm playback speeds
- ±10% adjustable pitch control
- RCA line outputs
- USB output
- 1/8-inch stereo minijack input
- Moving magnet phono cartridge
