= TTU =

TTU may refer to any of the following:

== College or university ==
=== United States ===
- Tennessee Technological University
- Tennessee Temple University
- Texas Tech University

=== Other countries ===
- Tallinn University of Technology, formerly known as Tallinn Technical University
- Tatung University, a university in Taiwan
- TTÜ KK, a professional basketball club associated with Tallinn University of Technology
- Tafila Technical University, a public university in Jordan
- Thanlyin Technological University, a technical university in Myanmar

== Other ==
- Tanzania Teachers' Union, a trade union in Tanzania
- Timed Text Unit, used in MPEG-4 Part 17
- TTUSB, a turntable
