= Audio-Technica =

Japanese audio equipment company

Audio-Technica Corporation 株式会社オーディオテクニカ

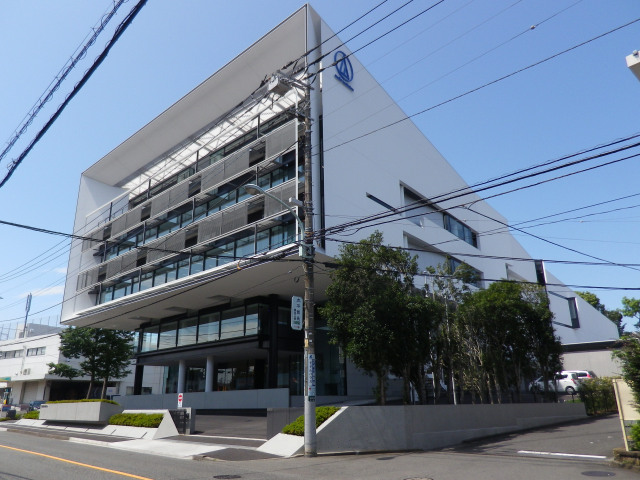
- Audio-Technica headquarters in Tokyo
- Type: Private KK
- Industry: Audio equipment
- Founded: 1962; 64 years ago Shinjuku, Tokyo
- Founder: Hideo Matsushita
- Headquarters: Machida, Tokyo, Japan
- Key people: Kazuo Matsushita (President)
- Products: Headphones; Microphones; Turntables; Phonograph cartridges; Wireless microphones
- Website: audio-technica.com/en-us/

Audio-Technica Corporation (株式会社オーディオテクニカ, Kabushiki Kaisha Ōdio Tekunika) (stylized as audio-technica) is a Japanese company that designs and manufactures professional microphones, headphones, turntables, phonographic magnetic cartridges, and other audio equipment.

== Company history ==
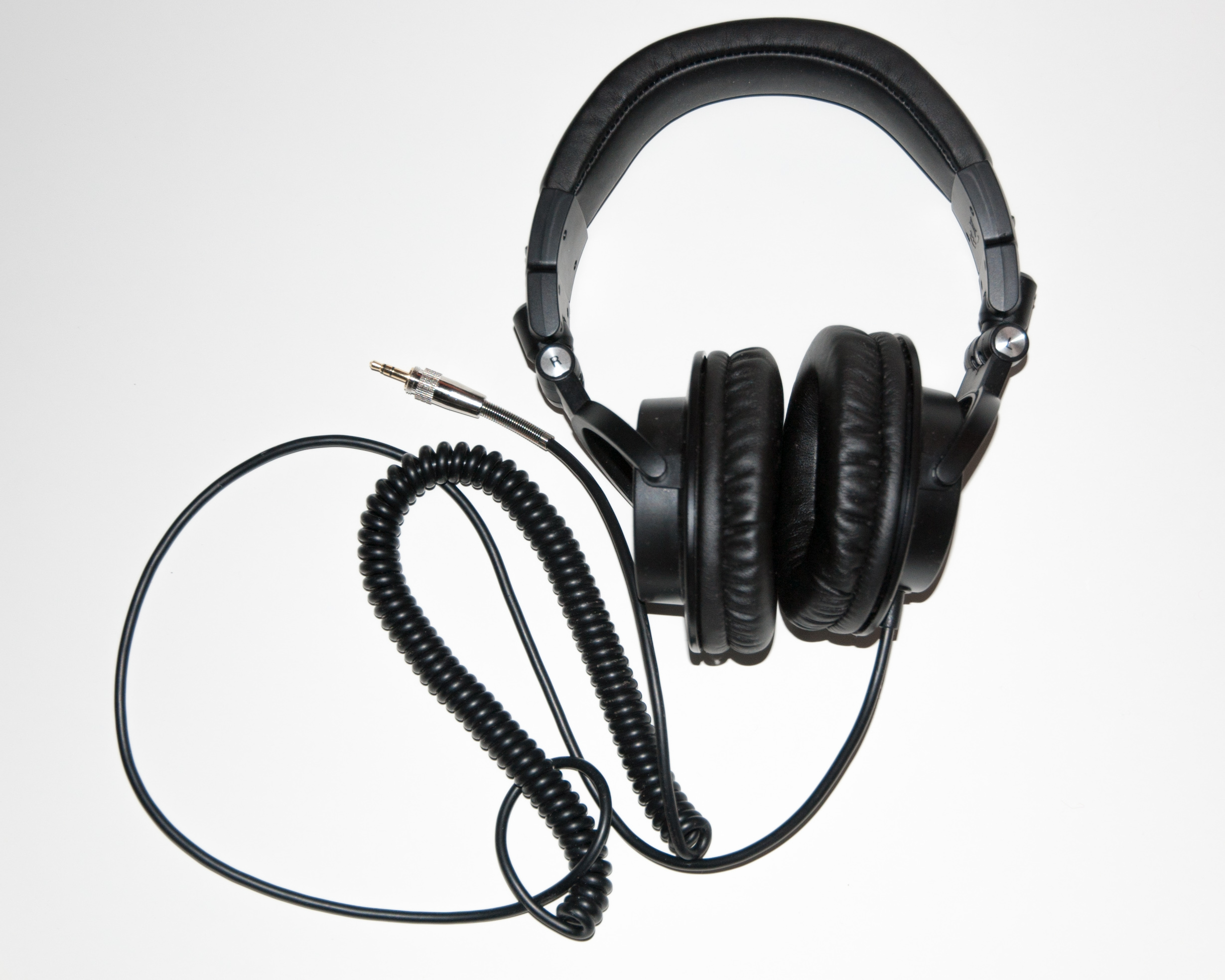
ATH-M50 headphones

Audio-Technica was established in 1962 in the Shinjuku district of Tokyo, Japan, by Hideo Matsushita as a phonograph cartridge manufacturer. Its first products were the AT-1 and the higher-end AT-3 MM stereo phono cartridges. Business rapidly developed, with the company starting to deliver cartridges to domestic audio manufacturers, and Audio-Technica expanded into other fields. The headquarters and factory moved to the current address in Naruse, Machida, Tokyo in 1965. In 1966, a test record entitled Moving Pulse (AT-6601) was released to help prove Audio-Technica's quality. In 1967, the company made a technological advance, releasing the AT-35X as the first ‘VM’ type stereo cartridge. This design increased growth in global exports, and the patent was extended across Switzerland, Canada, the UK, US, and West Germany. In 1969, the company began exporting phono cartridges worldwide and launched the first microcassette recorders.

In 1972, Audio-Technica established its US arm in Fairlawn, Ohio, and started shipping VM phono cartridges to European manufacturers. In 1974, the company developed its first headphones, the AT-700 series, which launched the same year. In 1977, celebrating its 15-year anniversary, Audio-Technica released second-generation models of dynamic headphones in the ATH-3, ATH-4, and ATH-5. That same year, the company developed and released the dual moving-coil MC-type AT-34 stereo cartridge. The AT-800 series of microphones were introduced in 1978, moving Audio-Technica into the commercial microphones market, and in the same year, the UK branch office in Leeds began operation.

In the 1980s, with the growth in digital music formats threatening its core business of phonograph cartridges, Audio-Technica began a period of diversification. Employee suggestions were solicited, with sushi machines among the ideas selected for further development.

In 1984, Audio-Technica introduced the ASM50 Nigirikko, a nigiri-forming appliance for home kitchens, which incorporated a turn-table like mechanism to deposit the nigiri onto. The market success of this product led the company to develop a range of sushi machinery for commercial and industrial use. Audio-Technica remains one of the largest manufacturers of sushi machines globally today, with products marketed under the brand AUTEC.

In 1981, a moving-coil cartridge that used diamond, specifically the AT1000 featuring a diamond cantilever, was introduced. That same year, the now long-selling AT33E was released.

In 1986, the company developed RCA cables with high-purity copper produced from the continuous metal casting process, "Pure Copper Ohno Continuous Casting" (PCOCC), invented and developed between 1982 and 1985 by Atsumi Ohno. In the same year, the company launched the AT33ML/OCC phono cartridge, the first made with PCOCC materials. In 1987, the AT-OC9 was released. This is the original cartridge model from which today’s fourth-generation AT-OC9X series evolved. In 1988, another Audio-Technica subsidiary was founded in Taiwan.

In 1990s, Audio-Technica introduced several large-diaphragm condenser microphones for studio use: the AT4033 cardioid microphone in 1991, the AT4050 multi-pattern in 1995, and the AT4060 vacuum tube cardioid microphone in 1998. The AT895, a DSP-controlled five-element microphone array providing adaptive directional audio acquisition, was introduced in 1999. In 1996, the Southeast Asian establishment began operation in Singapore.

In 1993, founder Hideo Matsushita took the position of Audio-Technica’s chairman. His son, Kazuo Matsushita, became the company's president.

From 2006 to 2007, Audio-Technica released its first earbuds and noise-cancelling headphones.

In 2008, the company celebrated its 20th anniversary of supplying microphones for US Presidential Debates, which it had been doing since 1988, and continues to do into the 21st century.

Since 2012, Audio-Technica has been releasing limited-edition headphones, debuting 11 limited-edition models between 2012 and 2023. For their 50th anniversary, the company celebrated at CES (Consumer Electronics Show) 2012, debuting five limited-edition products: the ATH-W3000ANV over-ear headphone, ATH-PRO700MK2ANV DJ headphones, the AT150ANV moving-coil phono cartridge, and the AT-TI15ANV solid titanium headshell.

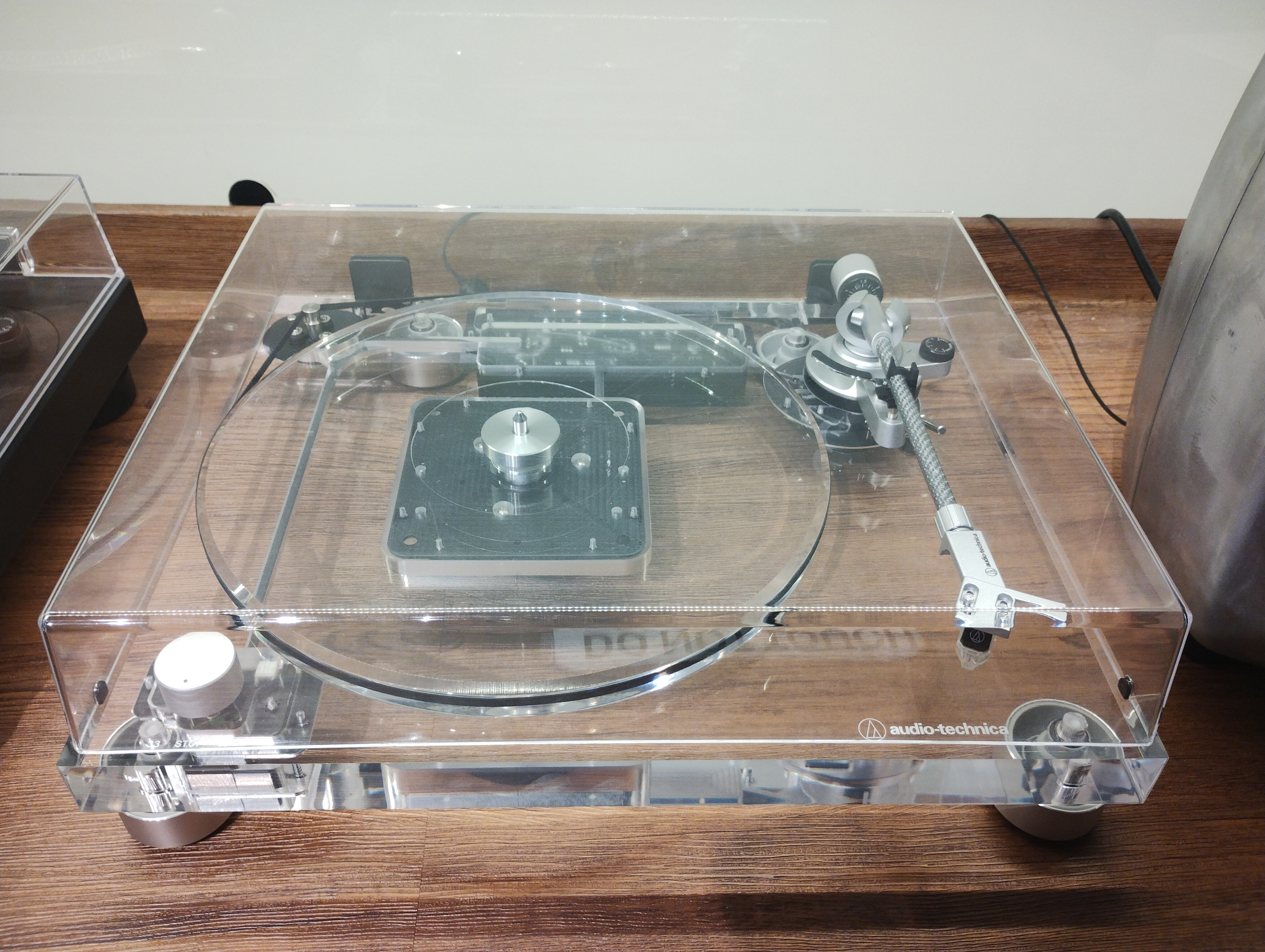
Audio-Technica transparent gramaphone

The company's founder, Hideo Matsushita, passed away on March 5, 2013. He was 93 years old.

At the IFA Berlin Show in 2014, Audio-Technica launched five new pairs of headphones, three of which were sport orientated, and a new USB turntable, the LP120USBC, which allowed users to convert vinyl records into digital music files for playback on computers, phones, and tablets. Also in 2014, the company remastered its M-Series line of professional monitor headphones with four next-generation M-Series headphones: ATH-M20x, ATH-M30x, ATH-M40x, and ATH-M50x.

At the CES in 2017, the company released over 15 new headphones ranging from high-res to wireless and both. This included the Sound Reality series, which consisted of in-ears, over-ears, and over-ear wireless headphones (ATH-CKR100iS, ATH-CKR90iS, ATH-CKR70iS, ATH-DSR9BT, ATH-DSR7BT, and ATH-SR9). Also in 2017, Audio-Technica partnered with Audient to release the AT2035-Studio "Essential Studio Kit", which was a microphone, interface, and headphone bundle. In 2018, Audio-Technica opened a Canadian branch office in the Montreal suburb of Saint-Hubert, Quebec.

At CES 2019, Audio-Technica unveiled seven new turntables, which included the AT-LPW series featuring dark walnut or teak wood finishes, an updated AT-LP120 series still "aimed at DJs", and four new additions to the AT-LP60 series. At NAMM 2019, the company offered new mic bundles geared toward drummers and vocalists (PRO-DRUM4, PRO-DRUM7, ATM-DRUM4, and ATM-DRUM7). At IFA 2019, the company introduced its ATH-CKS5TW and ATH-CK3TW truly wireless in-ear headphones.

The company would released the ATH-CK3TW in 2020, which featured Bluetooth 5.0 connectivity and a compact design, to fairly positive reviews. That same year, Swedish speaker manufacturer Audio Pro Business joined Audio-Technica’s portfolio of distributed brands in the United Kingdom, Ireland, France, and Spain.

In 2021, Audio-Technica continued to expand its product line, releasing the AT-BHA100 balanced headphone amplifier, the AT-DAC100 digital to analog converter, and the "affordable" AT2040 hypercardioid dynamic podcast microphone for podcasts, voice-overs, video conferencing. Also in 2021, Audio-Technica served as sponsor of the Relix Studio, the live streaming facility run by Relix magazine.

In March 2022, Audio-Technica Canada announced a multi-year agreement with the JUNO Awards to serve as the “Official Pro Audio Partner” for the program. In November 2022, for its 60^{th} Anniversary, the company announce the AT-LP2022 manual belt-drive turntable, a limited-edition record player featuring a 30 mm thick, high-density clear acrylic chassis. That year, the company would also resurrect its Sound Burger portable turntable from the 1980s, with the new model featuring Bluetooth connectivity and a built-in lithium-ion battery with USB-C charging. In January 2023, Audio-Technica announced that more Sound Burgers would be coming in the spring of that year.

At InfoComm 2023, the company showcased its range of integration solutions for commercial use, including its Engineered Sound Wireless system featuring wireless microphones for video- and web-conferencing as well as its ATND1061DAN ceiling array, which could be compatible with Microsoft Teams Rooms, Zoom Rooms, or AVer PTZ cameras depending on the system.

At the 2024 NAMM Show, Audio-Technica announced several big projects: the 3000 Series wireless in-ear monitor system, the AT2040USB hypercardioid dynamic USB microphone, the AT2020USB-XP cardioid condenser USB microphone, the ATH-M50xSTS StreamSet models, and limited-edition ATH-M50x wired and wireless headphones. In March 2024, the company announced its ATH-AWKG wooden high-fidelity headphones.

In 2026, the company announced two on-camera microphones designed for professional videographers and content creators, the ATV-SG1 and ATV-SG1LE, its first additions to this segment in 10 years.

== Audio equipment supplier ==
Since the late 1990s, Audio-Technica supplied microphones and headphones for US television shows, such as Big Brother, as well as induction ceremonies and several international events:

Period	Event	Editions
1993–2015	Country Music Association (CMA) Awards	27th to 51st Annual CMA Awards
1996–present	Summer Olympic Games	Atlanta 1996, Sydney 2000, Athens 2004, Beijing 2008, London 2012,Tokyo 2020
1997–2015	Rock and Roll Hall of Fame induction ceremony	
1998–2013	Grammy Awards	39th to 55th Annual GRAMMYs
2002–present	Winter Olympic Games	Salt Lake City 2002, Torino 2006, Vancouver 2010, Sochi 2014, Pyeongchang 2018 Beijing 2022, Milan Cortina 2026
2019	MotoGP	2019
2025	Electronic Sports League (ESL) Intel Extreme Masters	February 7–9 2025, the ESL Intel Extreme Masters in the Spodek Arena in Katowice, Poland
2025	Alpine World Ski Championships	Commissioned by Austrian broadcaster ORF

== Technology ==
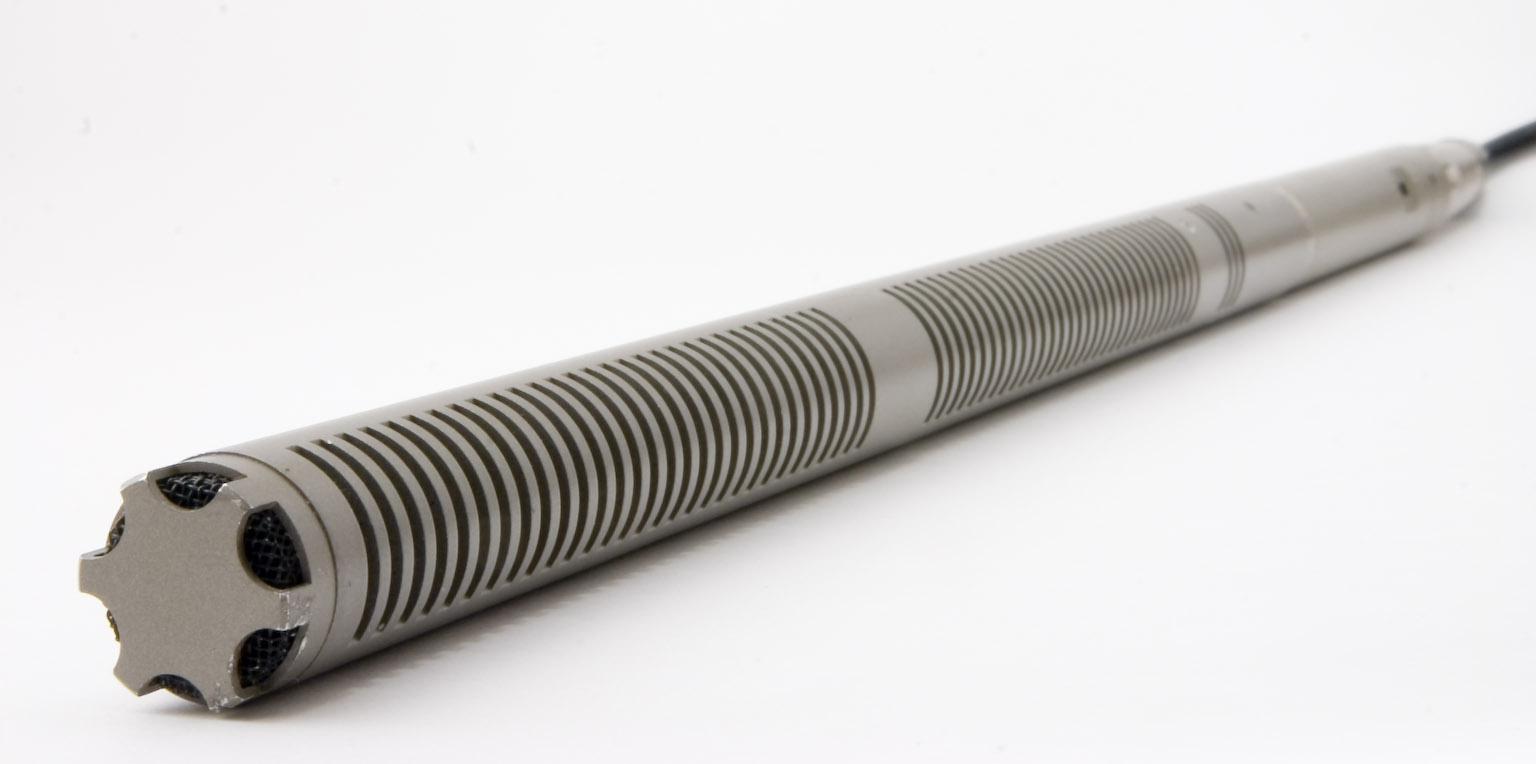
An Audio-Technica AT815a shotgun microphone

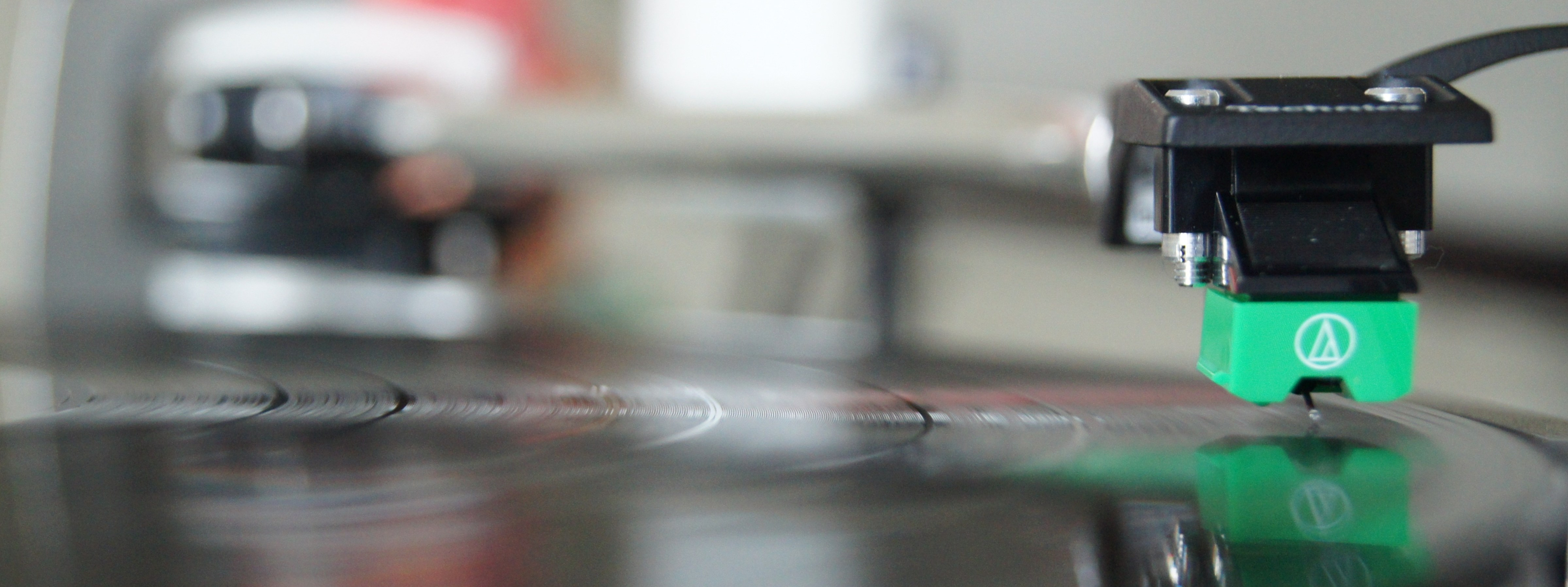
An Audio-Technica AT95E moving magnet phono cartridge

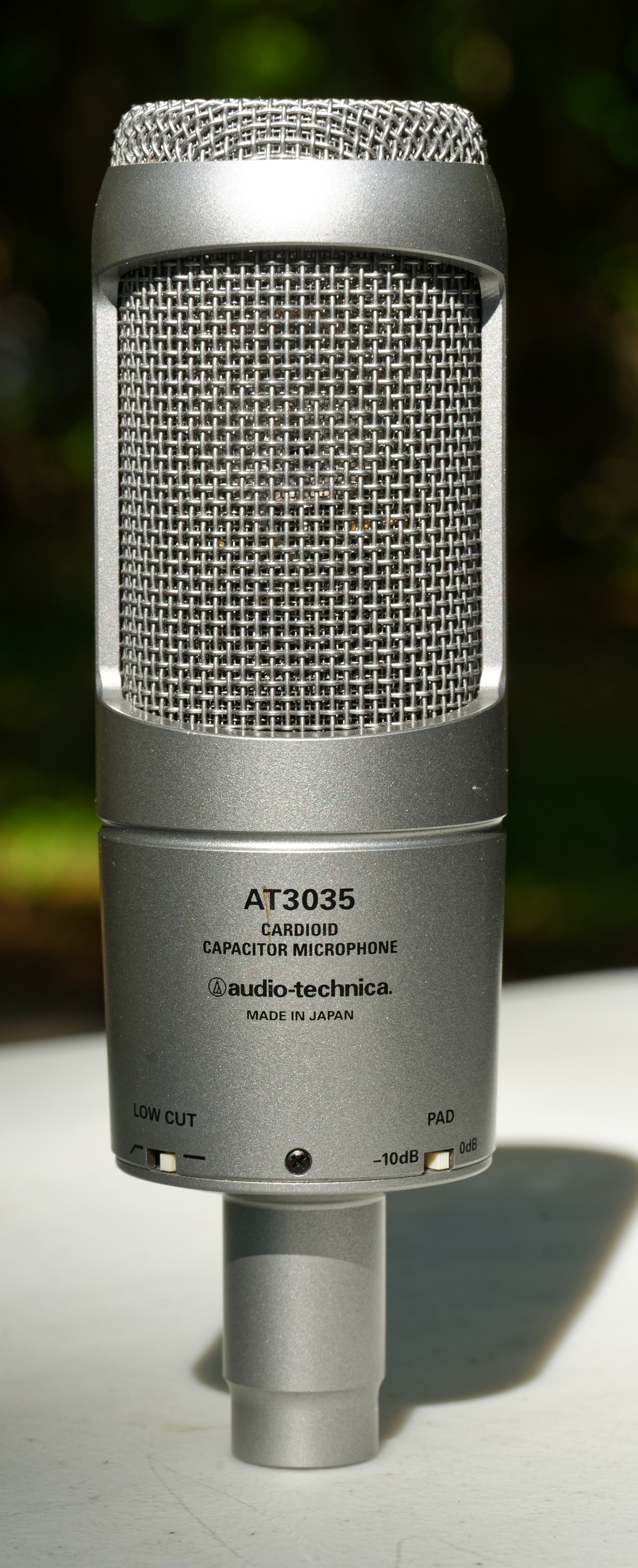
AT3035 microphone

One of their most famous products was a battery-operated, portable record player called Sound Burger (Sold in the US as Mister Disc) that was sold globally in the early 1980s. The model was re-launched in 2022 initially as a limited edition product, but due to overwhelming demand was made available permanently.

In 2005, Audio-Technica developed "Uniguard", a method for making microphones resistant to radio frequency interference from cell phones, Bluetooth devices, wireless computer networks, and walkie-talkies. Thirteen patents were involved in bringing the feature to fruition, as company engineers modified many different elements of microphone construction and operation. Over 50 existing Audio-Technica microphone models have been upgraded with the new RFI-resistant technology.

== Awards ==
In 1965, Audio-Technica received an award from the Agency of Industrial Science and Technology for its AT-1001 tone arm package.

In 1992, the company's AT4033 condenser microphone was chosen as the best microphone of 1991 at the Audio Engineering Society convention.

In 2017, Audio-Technica's ATH-DSR9BT pure digital drive wireless headphones received the CES Innovation Award. That same year, the AT-LP3 fully automatic turntable won the What Hi-Fi? 5-star Award.

In 2018, the AT5047 cardioid condenser studio microphone won a NAMM Technical Excellence & Creativity (TEC) Award for Outstanding Technical Achievement in the “Microphones – Recording” category.

In 2019, three products were nominated for "Outstanding Technical Achievement" in the 35th annual Technical Excellence & Creativity (TEC) Awards: the 5000 Series (Third Generation) UHF Wireless System, AT-LP140XP DJ turntable, and ATM350GL instrument microphone. That same year, Audio-Technica's ATH-M50xBT wireless headphones received the Best of CES 2019 award.

In 2024, the SoundStage! Network's Product of the Year awards featured Audio-Technica's AT-ART20 moving-coil cartridge and the Dayton Audio TT-1 turntable with Audio-Technica's AT-VM95E cartridge.

In 2025, the high-end Hotaru turntable/record player, which was revealed at Milan Design Week 2025, won the A' Design Award for the "Audio Products" category.

In 2026, the company's ATH-R70xa open-back reference headphones won for "Headphone/Earpiece Technology" at the 41st annual TEC Awards.

== See also ==
- Sound Burger
- Audio Engineer
- List of microphone manufacturers
- List of phonograph manufacturers
