= Sushi machine =

Device that automatically creates sushi

A sushi machine or sushi robot is a mechanical device that automatically creates various styles of sushi. Several are electrically powered. Some sushi machines produce mounds of sushi rice for creating nigiri. This style of sushi machine may use a hopper that is filled with sushi rice, from where the rice is fed into the machine and the sushi rice mounds are formed and then ejected. After the rice mounds are ejected, sliced raw fish, and other ingredients are then manually placed atop them. Some sushi machines can produce sushi rolls, whereby the machine automatically flattens rice into sheets, adds various ingredients such as fish, nori (edible seaweed) and vegetables, rolls them up and then slices the rolls into separate pieces. Some roll machines are adjustable to change settings for roll length and thickness. Sushi restaurants and food service operations may use sushi machines to reduce labor costs. Sushi prepared with electric sushi machines may be priced lower at retail stores and outlets compared to that prepared solely by humans. Some sushi machines are manually operated and function without the use of electricity.

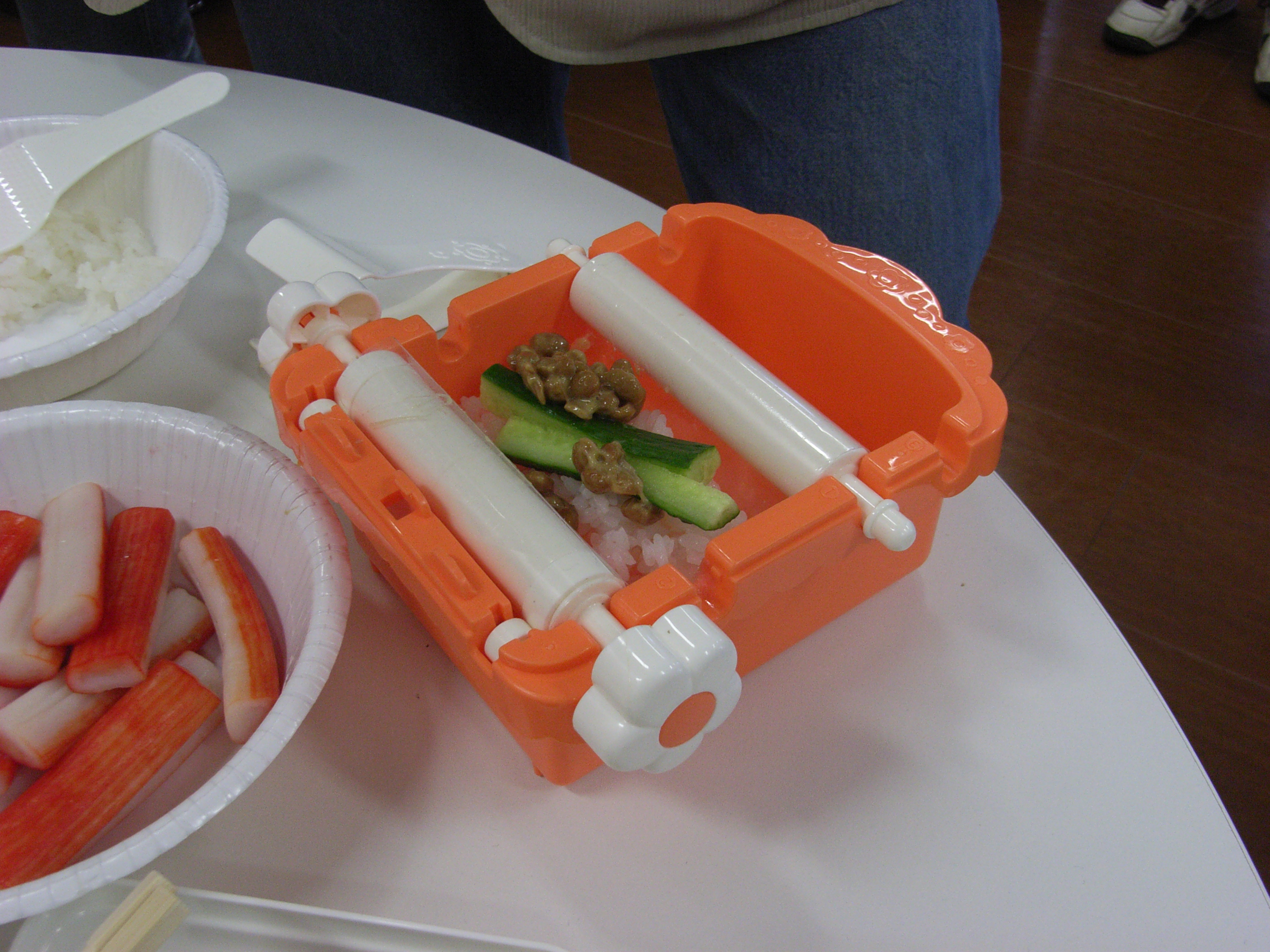
Ingredients in a manually operated sushi roll machine

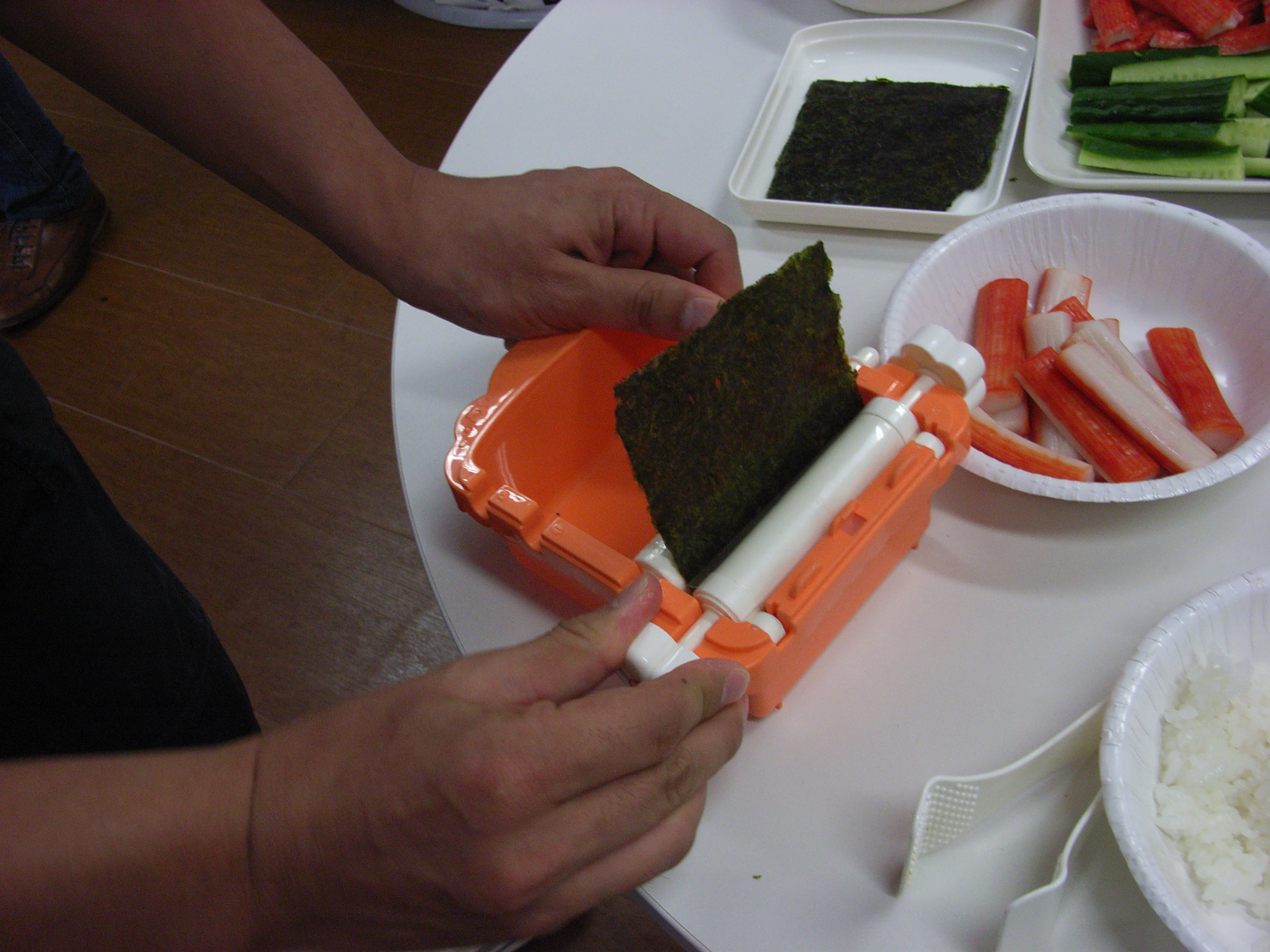
Nori being wrapped around the roll

== Manufacturers ==
An electric-powered sushi machine manufactured by Suzumo named Sushibot can produce up to 3,600 mounds of sushi rice per hour. Another Suzumo sushi machine produces up to 400 sushi rice mounds per hour. Suzumo is Japan's largest manufacturer of sushi machines, and the company has claimed to have invented the sushi machine in 1981. Suzumo held a market share of over 60% in the sushi machine category in April 2013. Additional manufacturers of sushi machines include Autec, Robotic Sushi and Taiko Enterprises, both of which produce several models. Robotic Sushi manufactures several industrial-sized and tabletop-style sushi machines, and one of Taiko Enterprises' models is designed to emulate sushi as prepared by humans. Autec, a subsidiary of audio equipment manufacturer Audio-Technica, is one of the largest companies in this field, and holds the second-highest market share in “shari-tama” (rice ball) rolling machines. They manufacture several models of sushi machines for commercial use. In 2014, Autec launched a new model that automatically produces shari, the style of rice prepared specifically for sushi. Sushi Machines is a company in Yorkshire, England, that manufactures manually operated sushi machines.

== See also ==
- Conveyor belt sushi – a form of fast-food sushi where the plates of sushi are placed on a rotating conveyor belt or moat that winds through a restaurant and moves past every table and counter seat
- Food technology
