= Sound Burger =

1980s portable record player by Audio-Technica

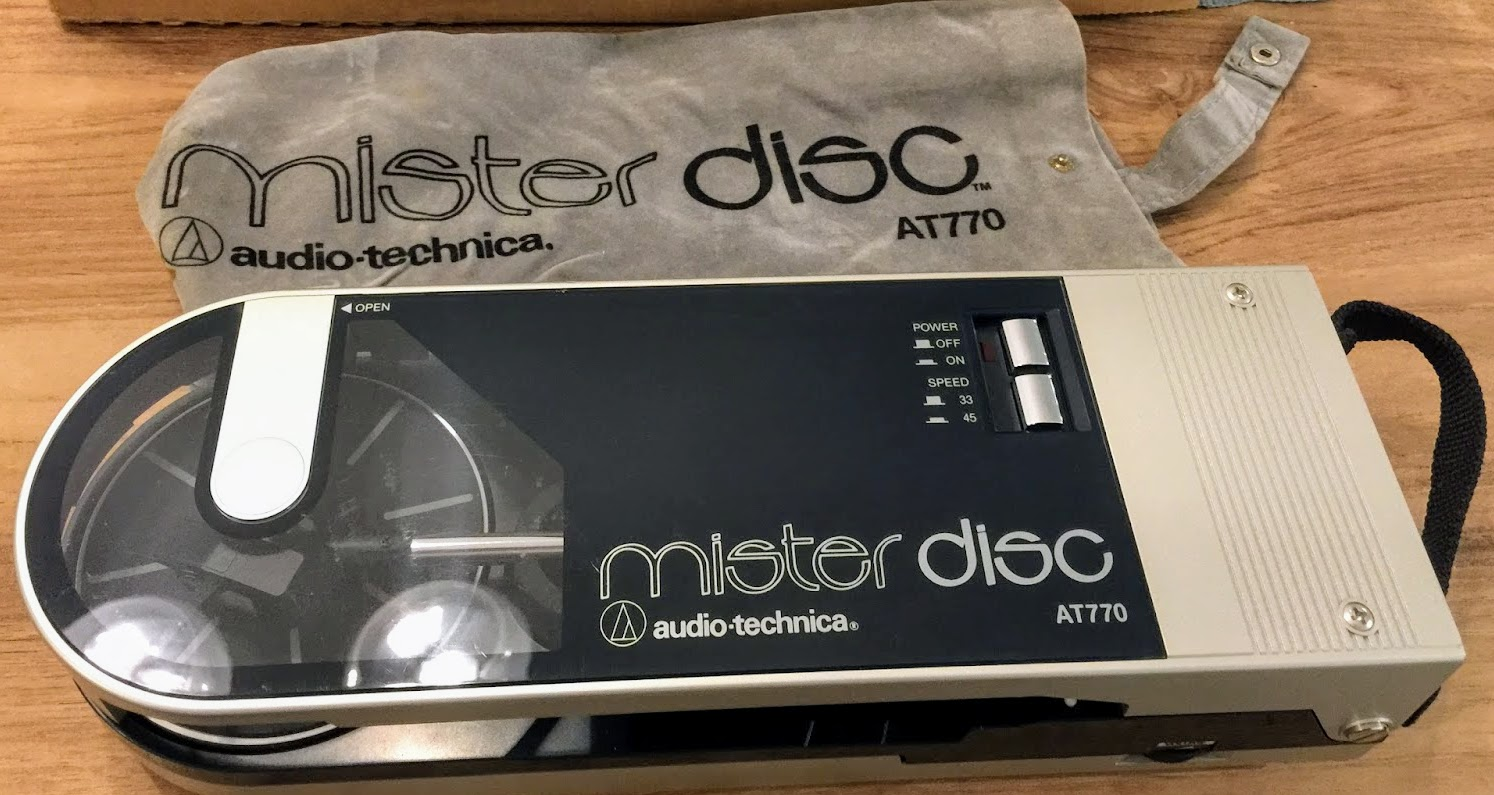
- The original Sound Burger, as sold under the Mister Disc brand in the United States
- Type: Record player
- Inception: 1983
- Manufacturer: Audio-Technica
- Models: AT770; AT-SB2022; AT-SB727

The Sound Burger is a portable record player developed by Audio-Technica of Japan. Originally released in 1983, it was brought back in an updated form in 2022.

The original Sound Burger (model no. AT770) was marketed in the United States as the Mister Disc. It was battery operated and was sold with a set of fold-away headphones, and was able to play both 33- and 45-RPM records.

Sound Burger AT-SB727 in yellow with a record

On 1 November 2022, to celebrate the 60^{th} anniversary of Audio-Technica, a batch of 7,000 new Sound Burgers were announced and available for purchase for $199.99 and quickly sold out. The units are all in red, with some changes from the original model such as: a rechargeable battery charged through USB-C, Bluetooth audio connection, normal buttons along with indicator lights instead of toggle switches, and a plaque on the back commemorating the anniversary. Following its success, on 5 January 2023, Audio-Technica announced a wider re-release of this edition without the commemorative plaque. Now known as the AT-SB727, it keeps the changes introduced in the SB2022 model and is available in yellow, black, and white.

== Specifications ==
Model	AT770	AT-SB2022 / AT-SB727
Release year	1983	2022/2023
Type	Belt-drive transcription turntable platter	Belt-drive
Platter	90 mm aluminium	Aluminium
Motor	DC, electronically controlled	DC, servo
Speeds	33 1/3 and 45 RPM	33 1/3 and 45 RPM
Signal to Noise	>50 dB	>50 dB
Tone arm	Dynamically balanced	Dynamically balanced
Cartridge	AT103	AT-3600LC
Frequency response	30–25000 Hz	
Output	110 mV per channel (line out); 36 mW per channel (headphones)	150 mV nominal at 1 kHz, 5 cm/sec
Power	4.5 V DC (3 C batteries)	DC 3.6 V lithium ion battery (USB-C input)
Battery life	12 hours	12 hours
Dimensions	290 by 99 by 65 millimetres (11.4 in × 3.9 in × 2.6 in)	290 by 100 x 70 millimetres
Weight	1.2 kilograms (2.6 lb)	900 grams (32 oz)
