= Vinyl killer =

Small record player that sits atop a record

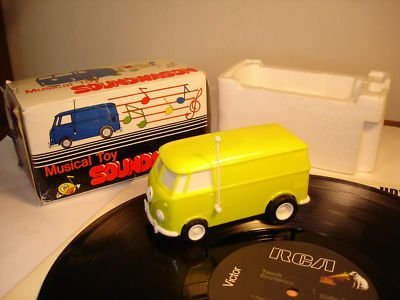
A soundwagon and its box

The vinyl killer (also known as a soundwagon or record runner) is a small record player which sits on top of a record and plays it by pushing or pulling itself along the grooves.

== History ==
The earliest known example of the vinyl killer was the Chorocco, from 1976. Produced by Sony in Japan, it was used as a promotional item and never sold. A unit is on display at a Sony museum in Japan.

A version of the product called the soundwagon was demonstrated at the Invention and New Product Exposition in 1982. It was being promoted by Jay Lance who was looking for a distributor in the United States at the time. The exterior of the product was shaped like a Volkswagen campervan.

== Design and operation ==
The product plays music by driving around the record, following its groove. A lever on the side starts and stops the machine. It was capable of playing records at 33, 45, and 78 RPM, and in reverse.

The name "vinyl killer" stems from the general opinion that the device can damage records more quickly than a standard turntable.
