= Phonograph =

Device for analogue recording of sound

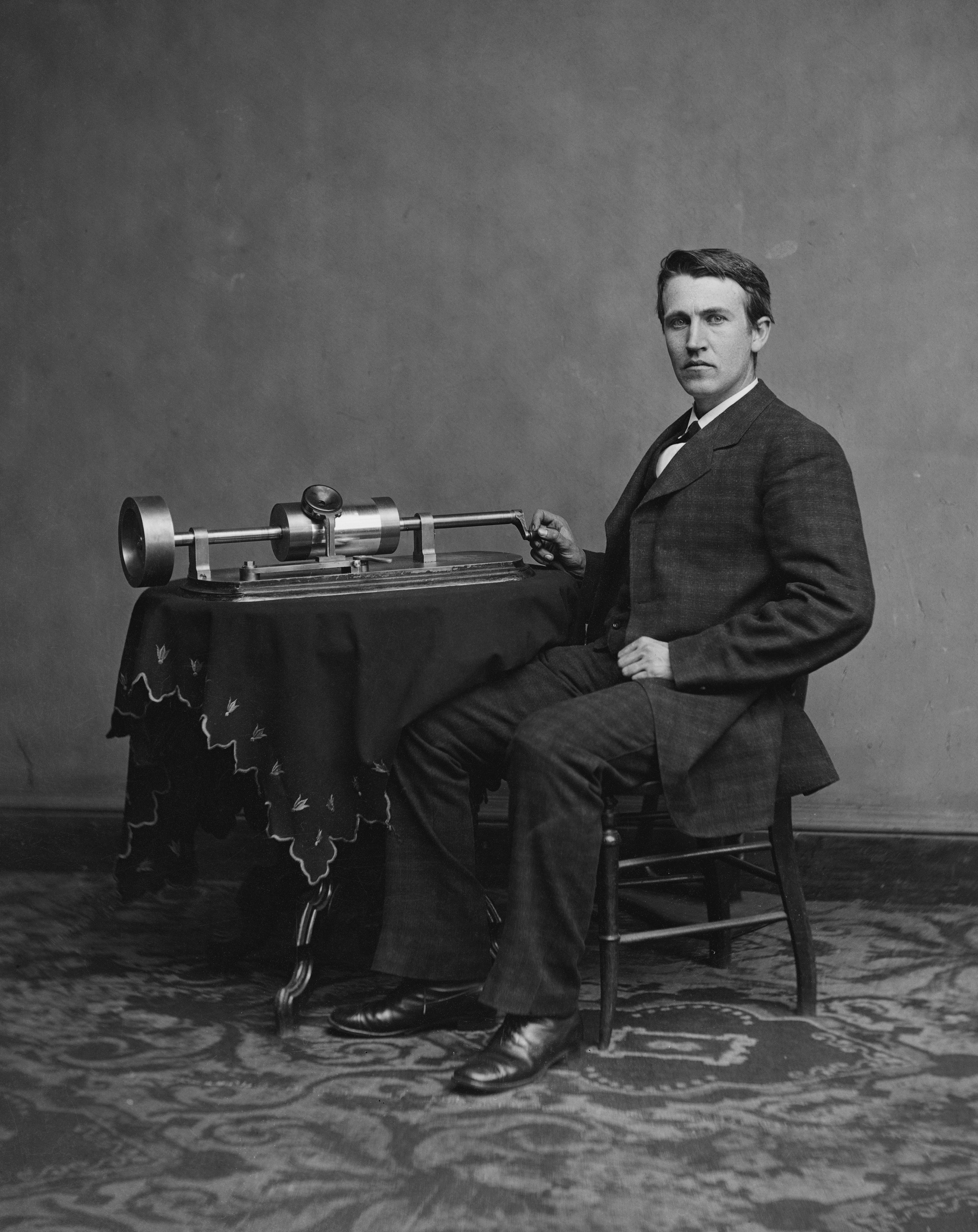
Thomas Edison with his second cylinder phonograph, photographed by Levin Corbin Handy in Washington, D.C., April 1878

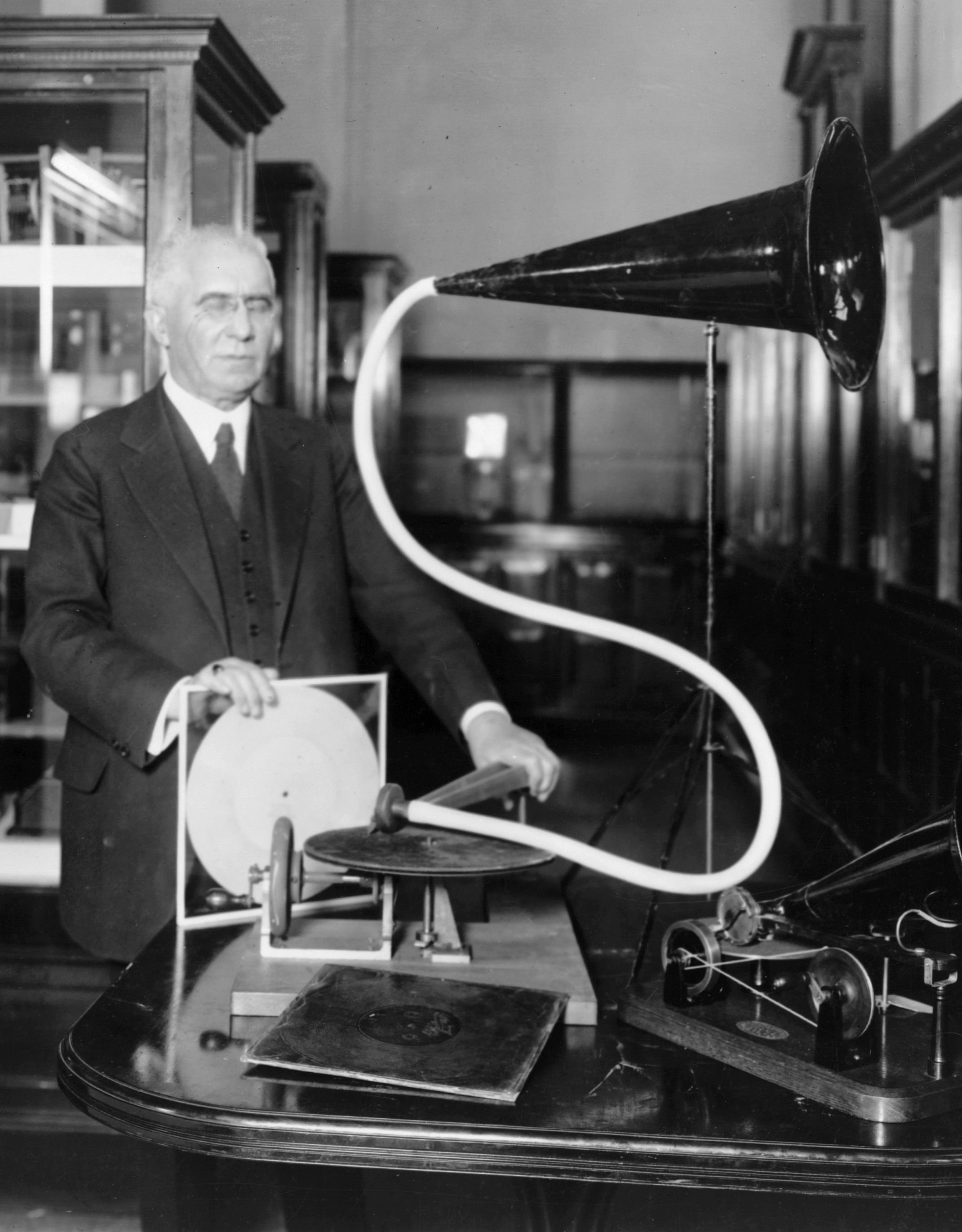
Emile Berliner with the first disk gramophone he developed, in Hanover, Germany, between 1910 and 1929

A phonograph, later called a gramophone, (Note: As a trademark since 1887, as a generic name in the UK since 1910.) and since the 1940s a record player, or more recently a turntable, is a device for the mechanical and analogue reproduction of sound. (Note: Historical phonographs could record sound.)

The sound vibration waveforms are recorded as corresponding physical deviations of a helical or spiral groove engraved, etched, incised, or impressed into the surface of a rotating cylinder or disc, called a record. To recreate the sound, the surface is similarly rotated while a playback stylus traces the groove and is therefore vibrated by it, faintly reproducing the recorded sound. In early acoustic phonographs, the stylus vibrated a diaphragm that produced sound waves coupled to the open air through a flaring horn, or directly to the listener's ears through stethoscope-type earphones.

The phonograph was invented in 1877 by Thomas Edison; Alexander Graham Bell's Volta Laboratory made several improvements in the 1880s and introduced the graphophone, including the use of wax-coated cardboard cylinders and a cutting stylus that moved from side to side in a helical groove around the record. In the 1890s, Emile Berliner initiated the transition from phonograph cylinders to flat discs with a spiral groove running from the periphery to near the centre, coining the term gramophone for disc record players, which is predominantly used in many languages. Later improvements through the years included modifications to the turntable and its drive system, stylus, pickup system, and the sound and equalization systems.

The disk phonograph record was the dominant commercial audio distribution format throughout most of the 20th century, and phonographs became the first example of home audio that people owned and used at their residences. In the 1960s, the use of 8-track cartridges and cassette tapes were introduced as alternatives. In the 1980s, phonograph use declined sharply due to the popularity of cassettes and the rise of the compact disc. However, records have undergone a revival since the late 2000s.

== Terminology ==
The terminology used to describe record-playing devices is not uniform across the English-speaking world. In modern contexts, the playback device is often referred to as a "turntable", "record player", or "record changer". Each of these terms denotes distinct items. A record player is generally a complete unit with speakers, while a turntable refers to a component that is connected to a separate amplifier and speakers. An automatic turntable will move the tonearm and shut off the motor after play, while a manual turntable requires placing the tonearm onto the record and manually returning the tonearm after play. A record changer plays a stack of records in sequence. A coin-operated jukebox plays from a large selection of records.

When integrated into a DJ setup with a mixer, turntables are colloquially known as "decks". In later versions of electric phonographs, commonly known since the 1940s as record players or turntables, the movements of the stylus are transformed into an electrical signal by a transducer. This signal is then converted back into sound through a phono stage, an amplifier and one or more loudspeakers.

The term "phonograph", meaning "sound writing", originates from the Greek words φωνή (phonē, meaning 'sound' or 'voice') and γραφή (graphē, meaning 'writing'). Similarly, the terms "gramophone" and "graphophone" have roots in the Greek words γράμμα (gramma, meaning 'letter') and φωνή (phōnē, meaning 'voice').

In British English, "gramophone" may refer to any sound-reproducing machine that utilizes disc records. These were introduced and popularized in the UK by the Gramophone Company. Initially, "gramophone" was a proprietary trademark of the company, and any use of the name by competing disc record manufacturers was rigorously challenged in court. However, in 1910, an English court ruled that the term had become generic.

=== United States ===
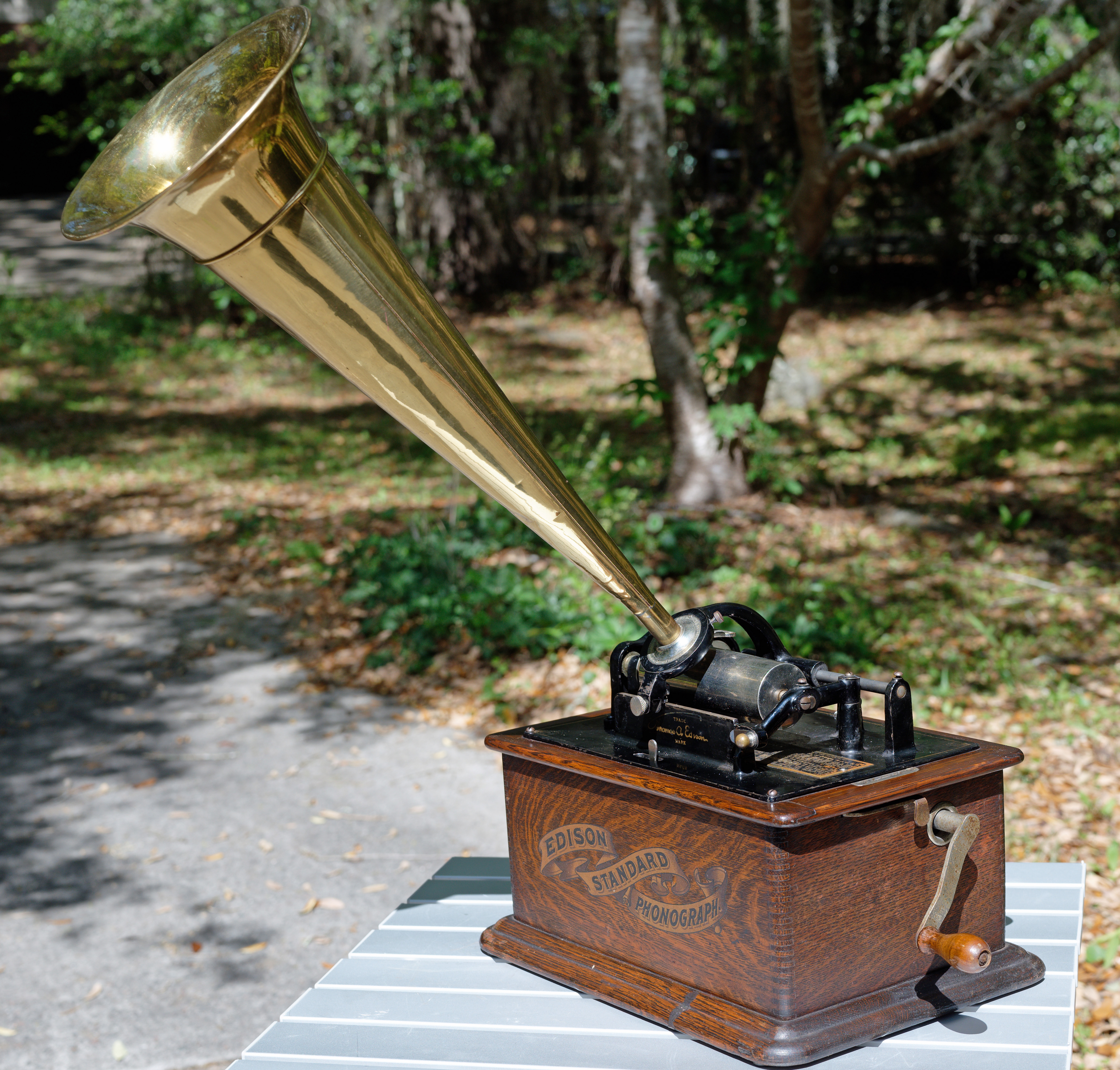
An Edison Standard Phonograph that uses wax cylinders

In American English, "phonograph", properly specific to machines made by Edison, was sometimes used in a generic sense as early as the 1890s to include cylinder-playing machines made by others. But it was then considered strictly incorrect to apply it to Emile Berliner's Gramophone, a different machine that played nonrecordable discs (although Edison's original Phonograph patent included the use of discs.)

=== Australia ===
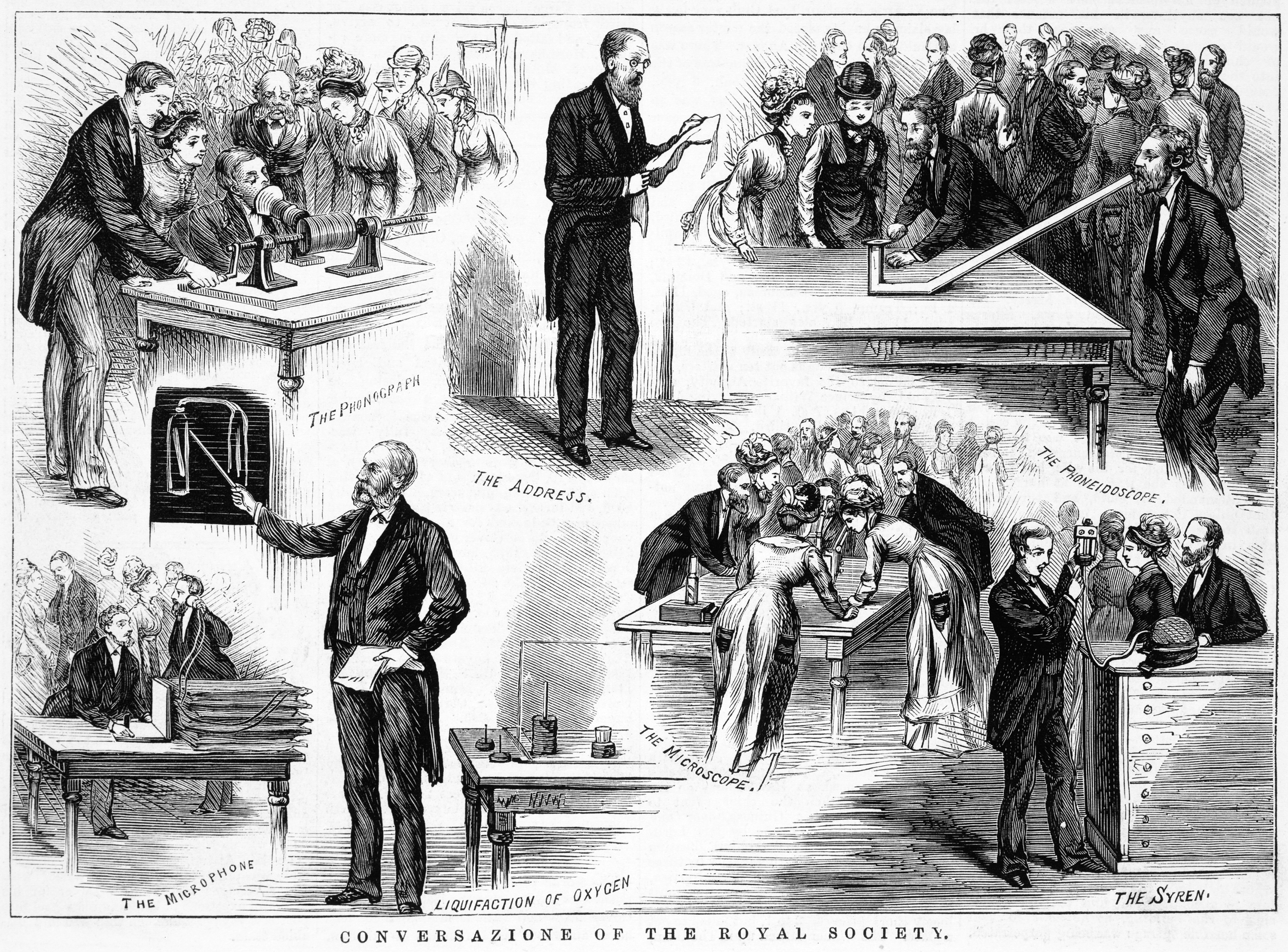
Wood engraving published in The Illustrated Australian News, depicting a public demonstration of new technology at the Royal Society of Victoria (Melbourne, Australia) on 8 August 1878.

In Australian English, "record player" was the term; "turntable" was a more technical term; "gramophone" was restricted to the old mechanical (i.e., wind-up) players; and "phonograph" was used as in British English. The "phonograph" was first demonstrated in Australia on 14 June 1878 to a meeting of the Royal Society of Victoria by the Society's Honorary Secretary, Alex Sutherland who published "The Sounds of the Consonants, as Indicated by the Phonograph" in the Society's journal in November that year. On 8 August 1878 the phonograph was publicly demonstrated at the Society's annual conversazione, along with a range of other new inventions, including the microphone.

== Early history ==
=== Phonautograph ===
The phonautograph was invented on March 25, 1857, by Frenchman Édouard-Léon Scott de Martinville, an editor and typographer of manuscripts at a scientific publishing house in Paris. One day while editing Professor Longet's Traité de Physiologie, he happened upon that customer's engraved illustration of the anatomy of the human ear, and conceived of "the imprudent idea of photographing the word." In 1853 or 1854 (Scott cited both years) he began working on "le problème de la parole s'écrivant elle-même" ("the problem of speech writing itself"), aiming to build a device that could replicate the function of the human ear.

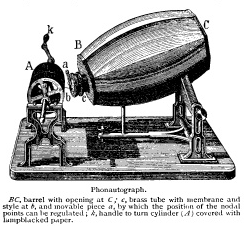
Dictionary illustration of a phonautograph. This version uses a barrel which has the inside made of plaster of Paris.

Scott coated a plate of glass with a thin layer of lampblack. He then took an acoustic trumpet, and at its tapered end affixed a thin membrane that served as the analog to the eardrum. At the center of that membrane, he attached a rigid boar's bristle approximately a centimetre long, placed so that it just grazed the lampblack. As the glass plate was slid horizontally in a well formed groove at a speed of one meter per second, a person would speak into the trumpet, causing the membrane to vibrate and the stylus to trace figures that were scratched into the lampblack. On March 25, 1857, Scott received the French patent #17,897/31,470 for his device, which he called a phonautograph. The earliest known surviving recorded sound of a human voice was conducted on April 9, 1860, when Scott recorded someone singing the song "Au Clair de la Lune" ("By the Light of the Moon") on the device. However, the device was not designed to play back sounds, as Scott intended for people to read back the tracings, which he called phonautograms. This was not the first time someone had used a device to create direct tracings of the vibrations of sound-producing objects, as tuning forks had been used in this way by English physicist Thomas Young in 1807. By late 1857, with support from the Société d'encouragement pour l'industrie nationale, Scott's phonautograph was recording sounds with sufficient precision to be adopted by the scientific community, paving the way for the nascent science of acoustics.

The device's true significance in the history of recorded sound was not fully realized prior to March 2008, when it was discovered and resurrected in a Paris patent office by First Sounds, an informal collaborative of American audio historians, recording engineers, and sound archivists founded to make the earliest sound recordings available to the public. The phonautograms were then digitally converted by scientists at the Lawrence Berkeley National Laboratory in California, who were able to play back the recorded sounds, something Scott had never conceived of. Prior to this point, the earliest known record of a human voice was thought to be an 1877 phonograph recording by Thomas Edison. The phonautograph would play a role in the development of the gramophone, whose inventor, Emile Berliner, worked with the phonautograph in the course of developing his own device.

=== Paleophone ===
Charles Cros, a French poet and inventor, is the first person known to have made the conceptual leap from recording sound as a traced line to the theoretical possibility of reproducing the sound from the tracing and then to devising a definite method for accomplishing the reproduction. On April 30, 1877, he deposited a sealed envelope containing a summary of his ideas with the French Academy of Sciences, a standard procedure used by scientists and inventors to establish priority of conception of unpublished ideas in the event of any later dispute.

An account of his invention was published on October 10, 1877, by which date Cros had devised a more direct procedure: the recording stylus could scribe its tracing through a thin coating of acid-resistant material on a metal surface and the surface could then be etched in an acid bath, producing the desired groove without the complication of an intermediate photographic procedure. The author of this article called the device a phonographe, but Cros himself favored the word paleophone, sometimes rendered in French as voix du passé ('voice of the past').

Cros was a poet of meager means, not in a position to pay a machinist to build a working model, and largely content to bequeath his ideas to the public domain free of charge and let others reduce them to practice, but after the earliest reports of Edison's presumably independent invention crossed the Atlantic he had his sealed letter of April 30 opened and read at the December 3, 1877, meeting of the French Academy of Sciences, claiming due scientific credit for priority of conception.

Throughout the first decade (1890–1900) of commercial production of the earliest crude disc records, the direct acid-etch method first invented by Cros was used to create the metal master discs, but Cros was not around to claim any credit or to witness the humble beginnings of the eventually rich phonographic library he had foreseen. He had died in 1888 at the age of 45.

=== The early phonographs ===
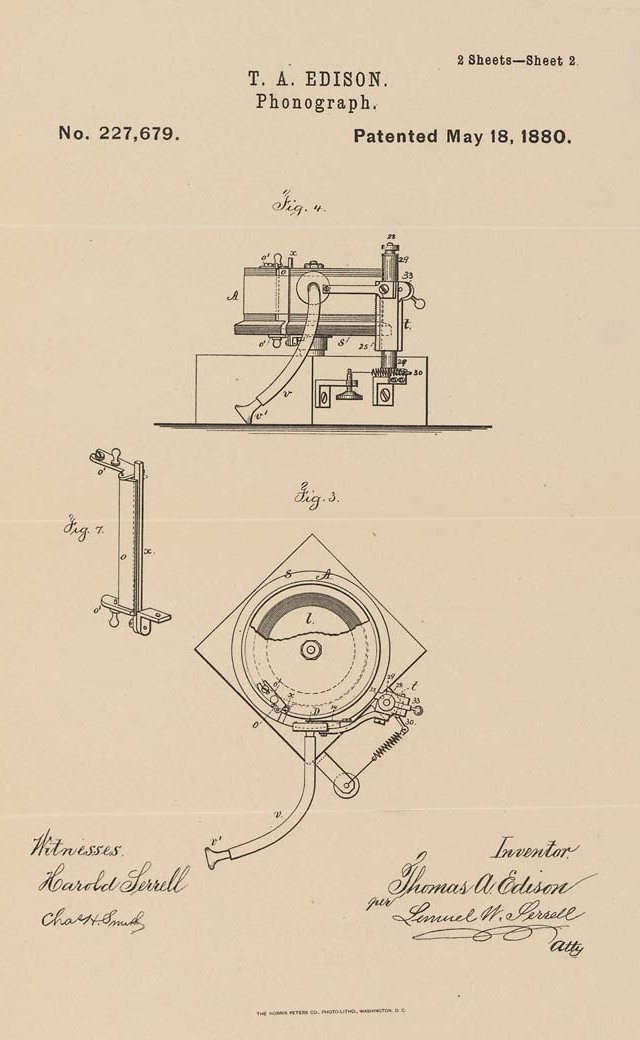
Patent drawing for Edison's phonograph, May 18, 1880

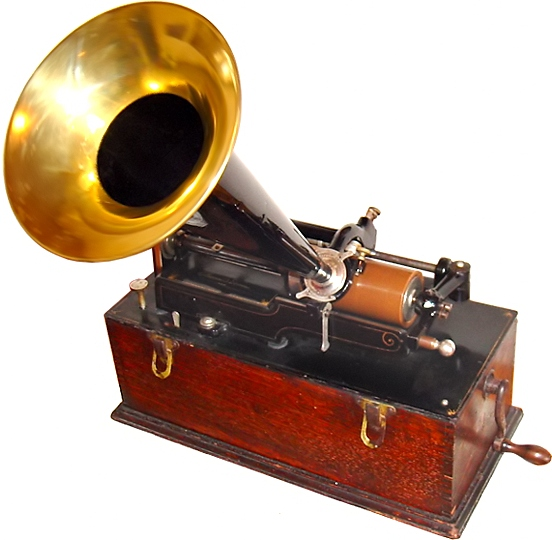
Edison wax cylinder phonograph, c. 1899

Thomas Edison conceived the principle of recording and reproducing sound between May and July 1877 as a byproduct of his efforts to "play back" recorded telegraph messages and to automate speech sounds for transmission by telephone. His first experiments were with waxed paper. He announced his invention of the first phonograph, a device for recording and replaying sound, on November 21, 1877 (early reports appear in Scientific American and several newspapers in the beginning of November, and an even earlier announcement of Edison working on a "talking-machine" can be found in the Chicago Daily Tribune on May 9), and he demonstrated the device for the first time on November 29 (it was patented on February 19, 1878, as US Patent 200,521). "In December, 1877, a young man came into the office of the Scientific American, and placed before the editors a small, simple machine about which few preliminary remarks were offered. The visitor without any ceremony whatever turned the crank, and to the astonishment of all present the machine said: 'Good morning. How do you do? How do you like the phonograph?' The machine thus spoke for itself, and made known the fact that it was the phonograph..."

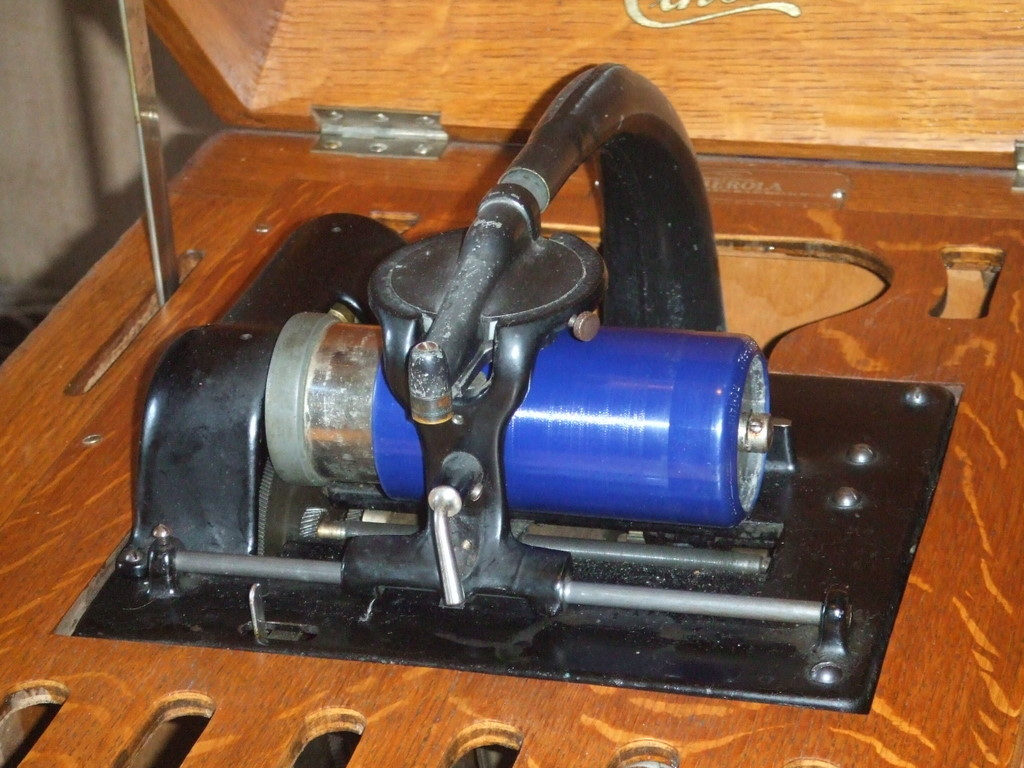
Close up of the mechanism of an Edison Amberola, c. 1915

The music critic Herman Klein attended an early demonstration (1881–82) of a similar machine. On the early phonograph's reproductive capabilities he wrote in retrospect: "It sounded to my ear like someone singing about half a mile away, or talking at the other end of a big hall; but the effect was rather pleasant, save for a peculiar nasal quality wholly due to the mechanism, although there was little of the scratching that later was a prominent feature of the flat disc. Recording for that primitive machine was a comparatively simple matter. I had to keep my mouth about six inches away from the horn and remember not to make my voice too loud if I wanted anything approximating to a clear reproduction; that was all. When it was played over to me and I heard my own voice for the first time, one or two friends who were present said that it sounded rather like mine; others declared that they would never have recognised it. I daresay both opinions were correct."

The Argus newspaper from Melbourne, Australia, reported on an 1878 demonstration at the Royal Society of Victoria, writing "There was a large attendance of ladies and gentlemen, who appeared greatly interested in the various scientific instruments exhibited. Among these the most interesting, perhaps, was the trial made by Mr. Sutherland with the phonograph, which was most amusing. Several trials were made, and were all more or less successful. 'Rule Britannia' was distinctly repeated, but great laughter was caused by the repetition of the convivial song of 'He's a jolly good fellow,' which sounded as if it was being sung by an old man of 80 with a cracked voice."

=== Early machines ===
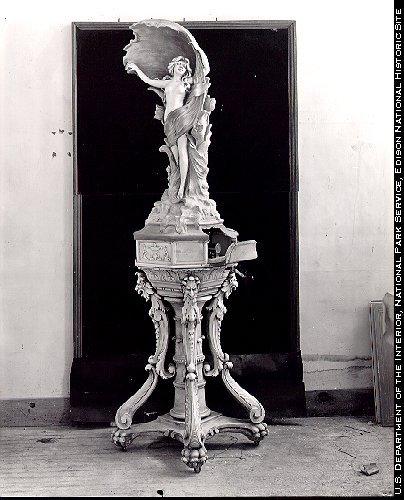
Phonograph cabinet built with Edison cement, 1912. The clockwork portion of the phonograph is concealed in the base beneath the statue; the amplifying horn is the shell behind the human figure.

Edison's early phonographs recorded onto a thin sheet of metal, normally tinfoil, which was temporarily wrapped around a helically grooved cylinder mounted on a correspondingly threaded rod supported by plain and threaded bearings. While the cylinder was rotated and slowly progressed along its axis, the airborne sound vibrated a diaphragm connected to a stylus that indented the foil into the cylinder's groove, thereby recording the vibrations as "hill-and-dale" variations of the depth of the indentation.

=== Introduction of the disc record ===
"I Am The Edison Phonograph"
This 1906 recording (with the character being voiced by Len Spencer) enticed store customers with the wonders of the invention.
2 minutes, 23 seconds.

By 1890, record manufacturers had begun using a rudimentary duplication process to mass-produce their product. While the live performers recorded the master phonograph, up to ten tubes led to blank cylinders in other phonographs. Until this development, each record had to be custom-made. Before long, a more advanced pantograph-based process made it possible to simultaneously produce 90–150 copies of each record. However, as demand for certain records grew, popular artists still needed to re-record and re-re-record their songs. Reportedly, the medium's first major African-American star George Washington Johnson was obliged to perform his "The Laughing Song" (or the separate "The Whistling Coon") up to thousands of times in a studio during his recording career. Sometimes he would sing "The Laughing Song" more than fifty times a day, at twenty cents per rendition. (The average price of a single cylinder in the mid-1890s was about fifty cents.)

=== Oldest surviving recordings ===
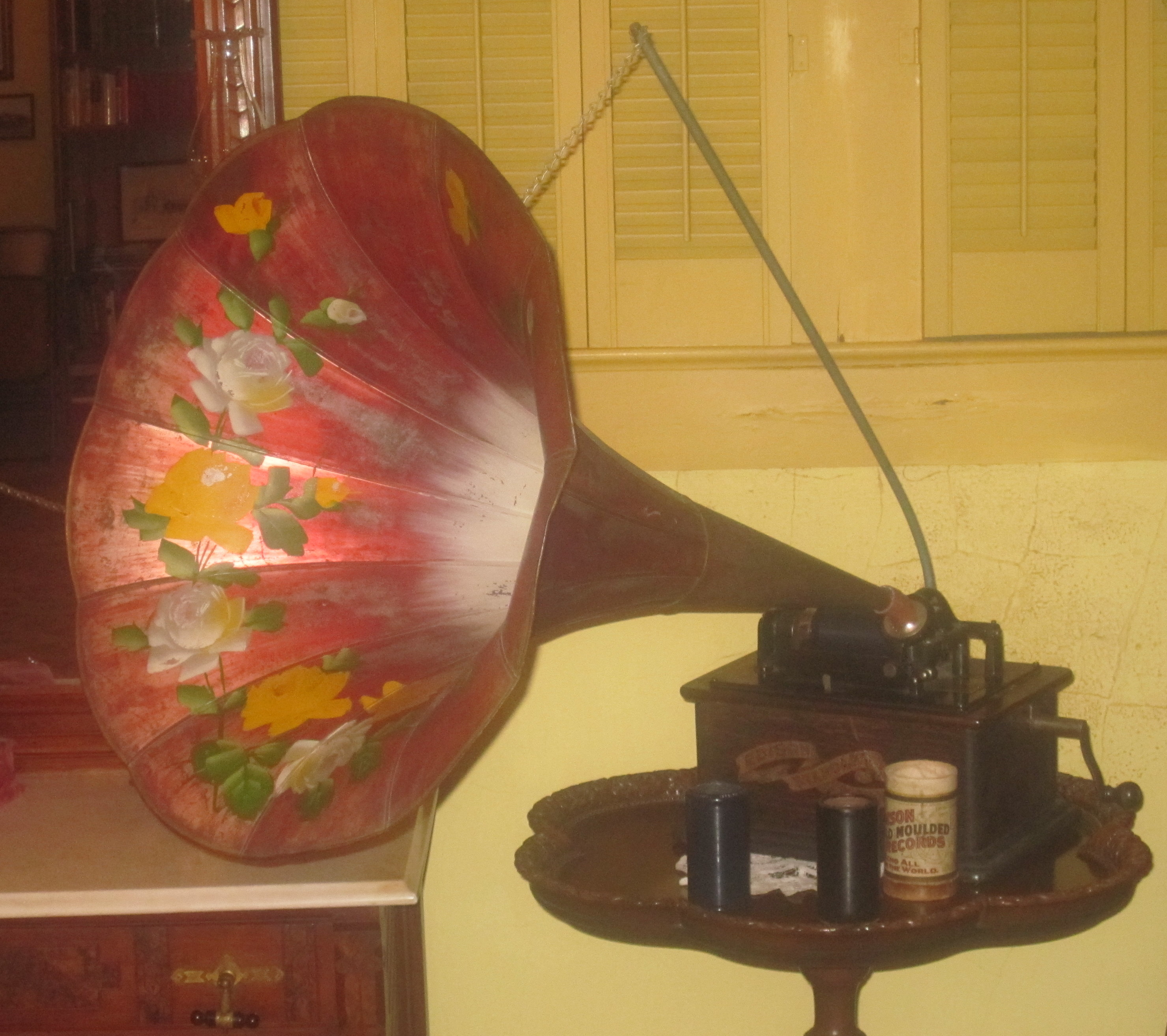
Early phonograph at Deaf Smith County Historical Museum in Hereford, Texas

Lambert's lead cylinder recording for an experimental talking clock is often identified as the oldest surviving playable sound recording, although the evidence advanced for its early date is controversial. Wax phonograph cylinder recordings of Handel's choral music made on June 29, 1888, at The Crystal Palace in London were thought to be the oldest-known surviving musical recordings, until the recent playback by a group of American historians of a phonautograph recording of Au clair de la lune recorded on April 9, 1860.

The 1860 phonautogram had not until then been played, as it was only a transcription of sound waves into graphic form on paper for visual study. Recently developed optical scanning and image processing techniques have given new life to early recordings by making it possible to play unusually delicate or physically unplayable media without physical contact.

A recording made on a sheet of tinfoil at an 1878 demonstration of Edison's phonograph in St. Louis, Missouri, has been played back by optical scanning and digital analysis. A few other early tinfoil recordings are known to survive, including a slightly earlier one that is believed to preserve the voice of U.S. President Rutherford B. Hayes, but as of May 2014 they have not yet been scanned. These antique tinfoil recordings, which have typically been stored folded, are too fragile to be played back with a stylus without seriously damaging them. Edison's 1877 tinfoil recording of Mary Had a Little Lamb, not preserved, has been called the first instance of recorded verse.

On the occasion of the 50th anniversary of the phonograph, Edison recounted reciting Mary Had a Little Lamb to test his first machine. The 1927 event was filmed by an early sound-on-film newsreel camera, and an audio clip from that film's soundtrack is sometimes mistakenly presented as the original 1877 recording. Wax cylinder recordings made by 19th-century media legends such as P. T. Barnum and Shakespearean actor Edwin Booth are amongst the earliest verified recordings by the famous that have survived to the present.

== Improvements at the Volta Laboratory ==
Alexander Graham Bell and his two associates took Edison's tinfoil phonograph and modified it considerably to make it reproduce sound from wax instead of tinfoil. They began their work at Bell's Volta Laboratory in Washington, D. C., in 1879, and continued until they were granted basic patents in 1886 for recording in wax.

Although Edison had invented the phonograph in 1877, the fame bestowed on him for this invention was not due to its efficiency. Recording with his tinfoil phonograph was too difficult to be practical, as the tinfoil tore easily, and even when the stylus was properly adjusted, its reproduction of sound was distorted, and good for only a few playbacks; nevertheless Edison had discovered the idea of sound recording. However immediately after his discovery he did not improve it, allegedly because of an agreement to spend the next five years developing the New York City electric light and power system.

=== Volta's early challenge ===
Meanwhile, Bell, a scientist and experimenter at heart, was looking for new worlds to conquer after having patented the telephone. According to Sumner Tainter, it was through Gardiner Green Hubbard that Bell took up the phonograph challenge. Bell had married Hubbard's daughter Mabel in 1879 while Hubbard was president of the Edison Speaking Phonograph Co., and his organization, which had purchased the Edison patent, was financially troubled because people did not want to buy a machine that seldom worked well and proved difficult for the average person to operate.

=== Volta Graphophone ===
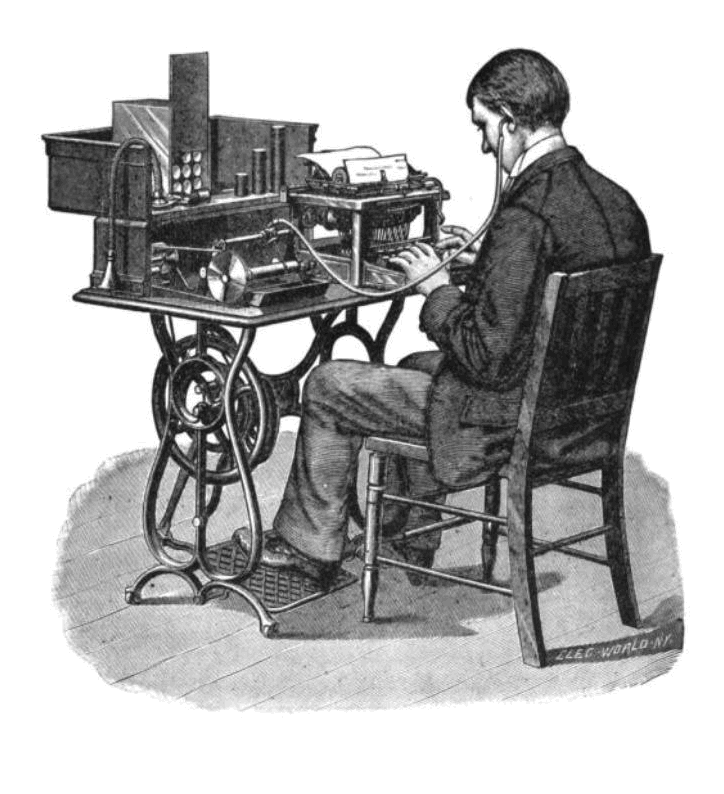
A 'G' (Graham Bell) model Graphophone being played back by a typist after its cylinder had recorded dictation.

The sound vibrations had been indented in the wax that had been applied to the Edison phonograph. The following was the text of one of their recordings: "There are more things in heaven and earth, Horatio, than are dreamed of in your philosophy. I am a Graphophone and my mother was a phonograph." Most of the disc machines designed at the Volta Lab had their disc mounted on vertical turntables. The explanation is that in the early experiments, the turntable, with disc, was mounted on the shop lathe, along with the recording and reproducing heads. Later, when the complete models were built, most of them featured vertical turntables.

One interesting exception was a horizontal seven inch turntable. The machine, although made in 1886, was a duplicate of one made earlier but taken to Europe by Chichester Bell. Tainter was granted U.S. patent 385,886 on July 10, 1888. The playing arm is rigid, except for a pivoted vertical motion of 90 degrees to allow removal of the record or a return to starting position. While recording or playing, the record not only rotated, but moved laterally under the stylus, which thus described a spiral, recording 150 grooves to the inch.

The basic distinction between the Edison's first phonograph patent and the Bell and Tainter patent of 1886 was the method of recording. Edison's method was to indent the sound waves on a piece of tin foil, while Bell and Tainter's invention called for cutting, or "engraving", the sound waves into a wax record with a sharp recording stylus.

=== Graphophone commercialization ===
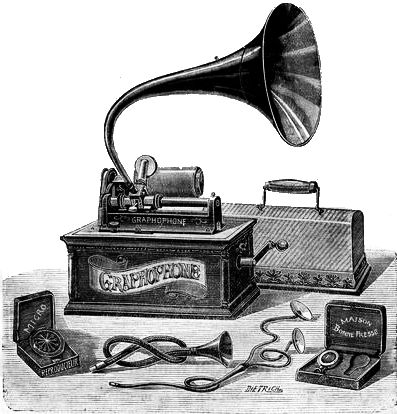
A later-model Columbia Graphophone of 1901

Edison-Phonograph playing: Iola by the Edison Military Band (video, 3 min 51 s)

In 1885, when the Volta Associates were sure that they had a number of practical inventions, they filed patent applications and began to seek out investors. The Volta Graphophone Company of Alexandria, Virginia, was created on January 6, 1886, and incorporated on February 3, 1886. It was formed to control the patents and to handle the commercial development of their sound recording and reproduction inventions, one of which became the first Dictaphone.

After the Volta Associates gave several demonstrations in the City of Washington, businessmen from Philadelphia created the American Graphophone Company on March 28, 1887, in order to produce and sell the machines for the budding phonograph marketplace. The Volta Graphophone Company then merged with American Graphophone, which itself later evolved into Columbia Records.

A coin-operated version of the Graphophone, U.S. patent 506,348, was developed by Tainter in 1893 to compete with nickel-in-the-slot entertainment phonograph U.S. patent 428,750 demonstrated in 1889 by Louis T. Glass, manager of the Pacific Phonograph Company.

The work of the Volta Associates laid the foundation for the successful use of dictating machines in business, because their wax recording process was practical and their machines were durable. But it would take several more years and the renewed efforts of Edison and the further improvements of Emile Berliner and many others, before the recording industry became a major factor in home entertainment.

The technology quickly became popular abroad, where it was also used in new ways. In 1895, for example, Hungary became the first country to use phonographs to conduct folklore and ethnomusicological research, after which it became common practice in ethnography.

== Disc vs. cylinder as a recording medium ==
Discs are not inherently better than cylinders at providing audio fidelity. Rather, the advantages of the format are seen in the manufacturing process: discs can be stamped, and the matrixes to stamp disc can be shipped to other printing plants for a global distribution of recordings; cylinders could not be stamped until 1901–1902, when the gold moulding process was introduced by Edison.

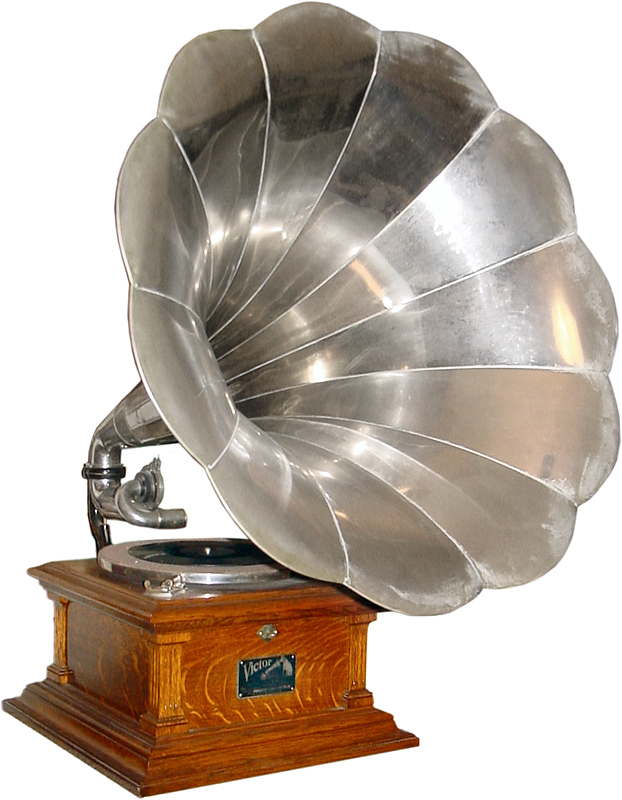
A Victor V phonograph, circa 1907

Through experimentation, in 1892, Berliner began commercial production of his disc records and "gramophones". His "phonograph record" was the first disc record to be offered to the public. They were five inches (13 cm) in diameter and recorded on one side only. Seven-inch (17.5 cm) records followed in 1895. The same year, Berliner replaced the hard rubber used to make the discs with a shellac compound. Berliner's early records had poor sound quality, however. Work by Eldridge R. Johnson eventually improved the sound fidelity to a point where it was as good as the cylinder.

Wax cylinders would continue to be used into the 1920s, with New York City-based Czech immigrant, businessman, and inventor Alois Benjamin Saliger using cylinders for his "Psycho-Phone" or "Psychophone", a specialized phonograph or gramophone that Saliger intended to be used in the field of psychology. Invented in 1927 for sleep learning, the Psychophone featured a clock mounted on top of a phonograph, with a repeater device for rewinding and continuously replaying records. While Edison machines had a spring-powered motor, powered by crank on the side, Psychophone models featured an electric-powered motor. Saliger patented the device in 1932 as the "automatic time-controlled suggestion machine".

== Dominance of the disc record ==
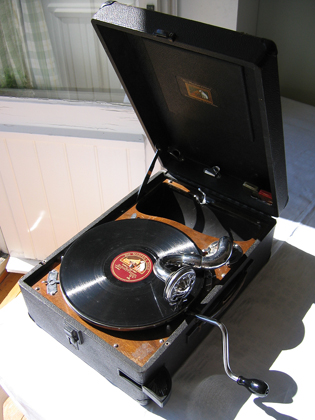
A 1930s portable wind-up gramophone from The Gramophone Company

In the 1930s, vinyl (originally known as vinylite) was introduced as a record material for radio transcription discs, and for radio commercials. At that time, virtually no discs for home use were made from this material. Vinyl was used for the popular 78-rpm V-discs issued to US soldiers during World War II. This significantly reduced breakage during transport. The first commercial vinylite record was the set of five 12" discs "Prince Igor" (Asch Records album S-800, dubbed from Soviet masters in 1945). Victor began selling some home-use vinyl 78s in late 1945; but most 78s were made of a shellac compound until the 78-rpm format was completely phased out. (Shellac records were heavier and more brittle.) 33s and 45s were, however, made exclusively of vinyl, with the exception of some 45s manufactured out of polystyrene.

=== First all-transistor phonograph ===
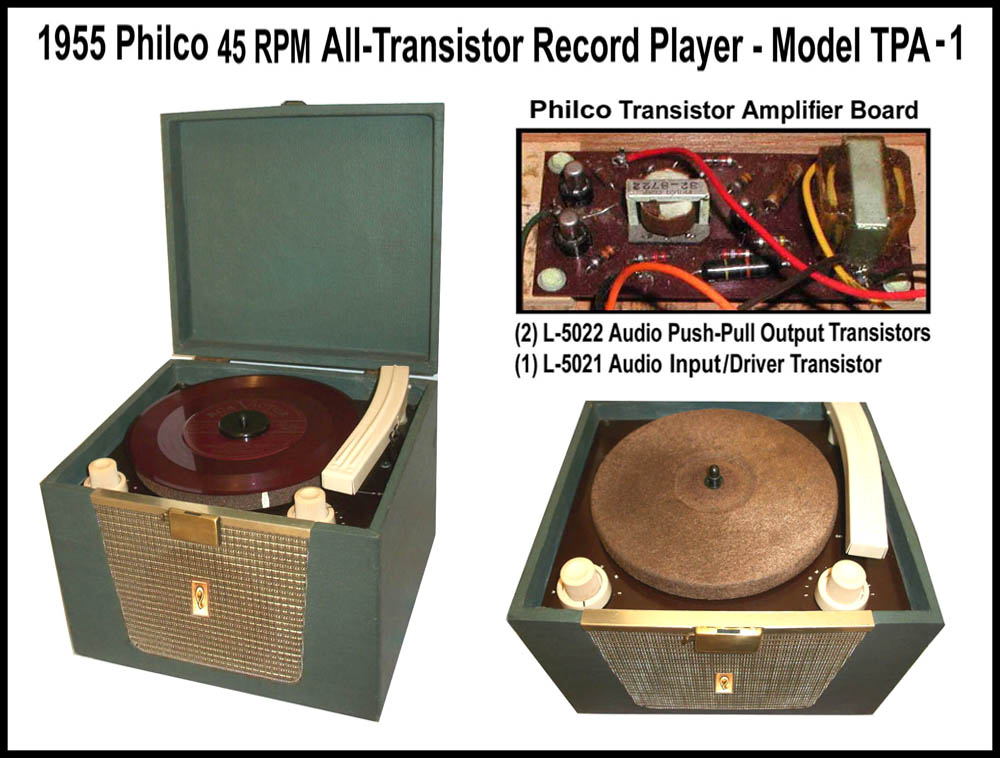
Philco all-transistor model TPA-1 phonograph, developed and produced in 1955

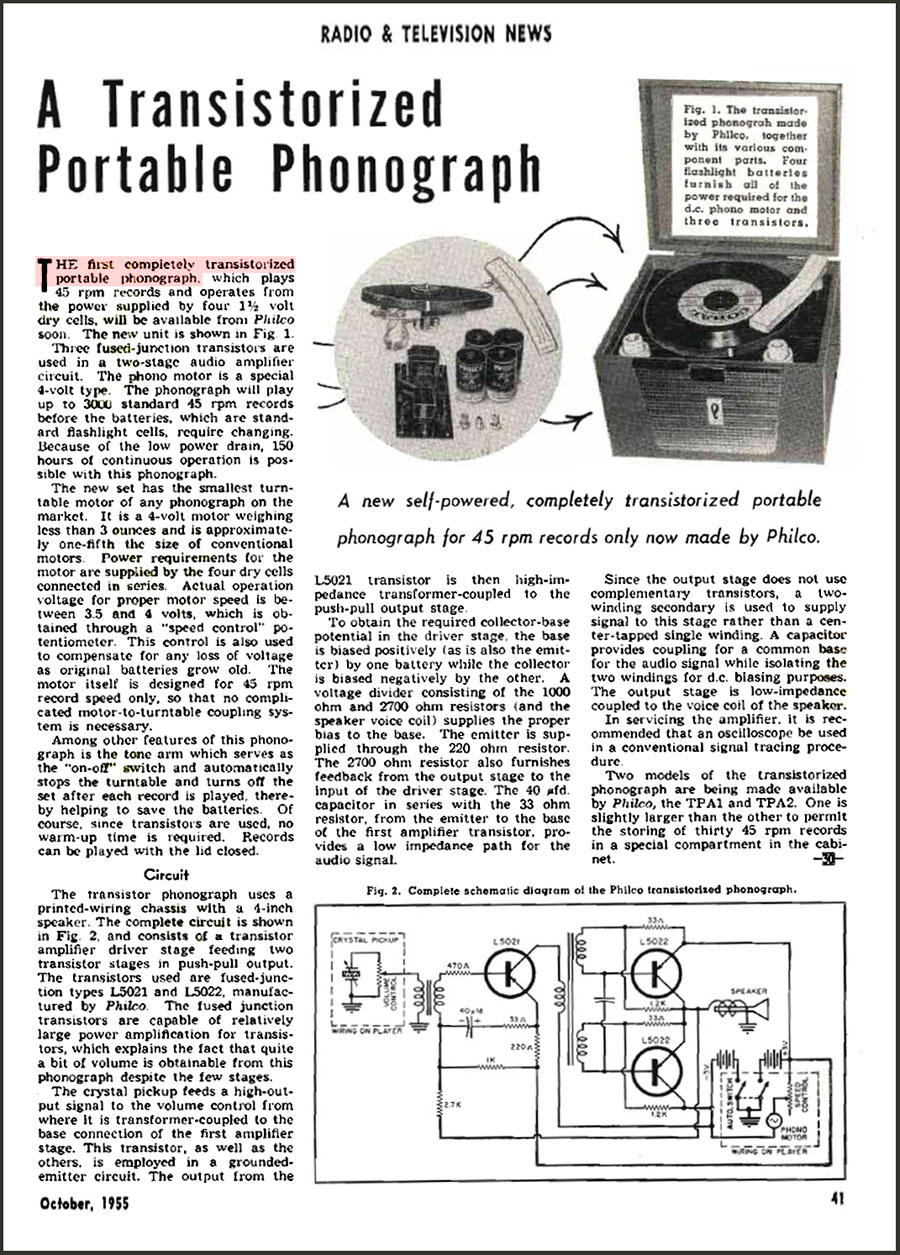
Philco all-transistor model TPA-1 phonograph – Radio and Television News magazine, issue October 1955

In 1955, Philco developed and produced the world's first all-transistor phonograph models TPA-1 and TPA-2, which were announced in the June 28, 1955, edition of The Wall Street Journal. Philco started to sell these all-transistor phonographs in the fall of 1955, for the price of $59.95. The October 1955 issue of Radio & Television News magazine (page 41), had a full page detailed article on Philco's new consumer product. The all-transistor portable phonograph TPA-1 and TPA-2 models played only 45 rpm records and used four 1.5-volt "D" batteries for their power supply. The "TPA" stands for "Transistor Phonograph Amplifier". Their circuitry used three Philco germanium PNP alloy-fused junction audio frequency transistors. After the 1956 season had ended, Philco decided to discontinue both models, for transistors were too expensive compared to vacuum tubes, but by 1961 a $49.95 ($538.16 in 2025) portable, battery-powered radio-phonograph with seven transistors was available.

== Turntable designs ==
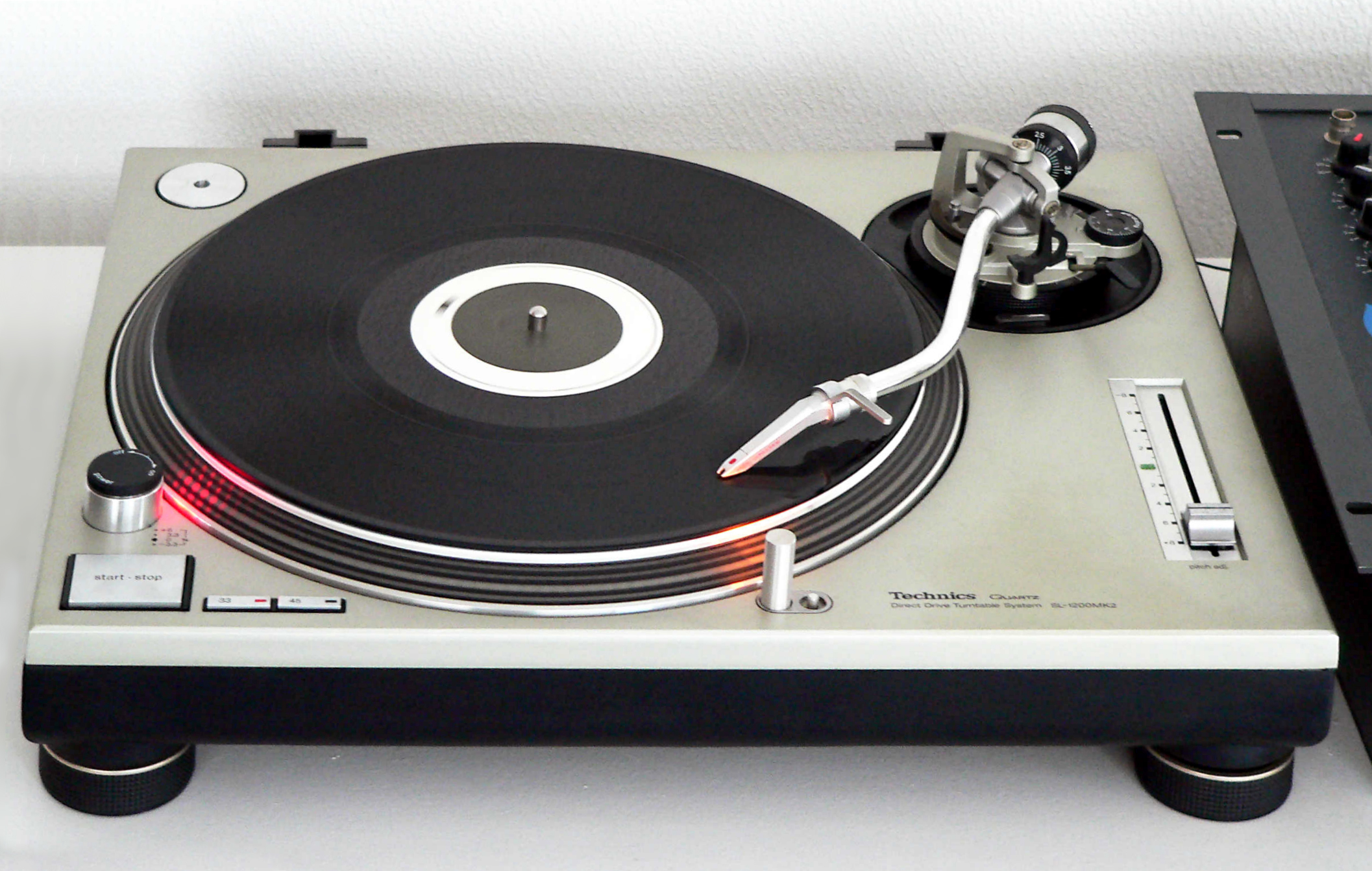
A Technics SL-1200 direct-drive turntable

There are presently three main phonograph designs: belt-drive, direct-drive, and idler-wheel.

In a belt-drive turntable the motor is located off-center from the platter, either underneath it or entirely outside of it, and is connected to the platter or counter-platter by a drive belt made from elastomeric material.

The direct-drive turntable was invented by Shuichi Obata, an engineer at Matsushita (now Panasonic). In 1969, Matsushita released it as the Technics SP-10, the first direct-drive turntable on the market. The most influential direct-drive turntable was the Technics SL-1200, which, following the spread of turntablism in hip hop culture, became the most widely used turntable in DJ culture for several decades.

== Arm systems ==
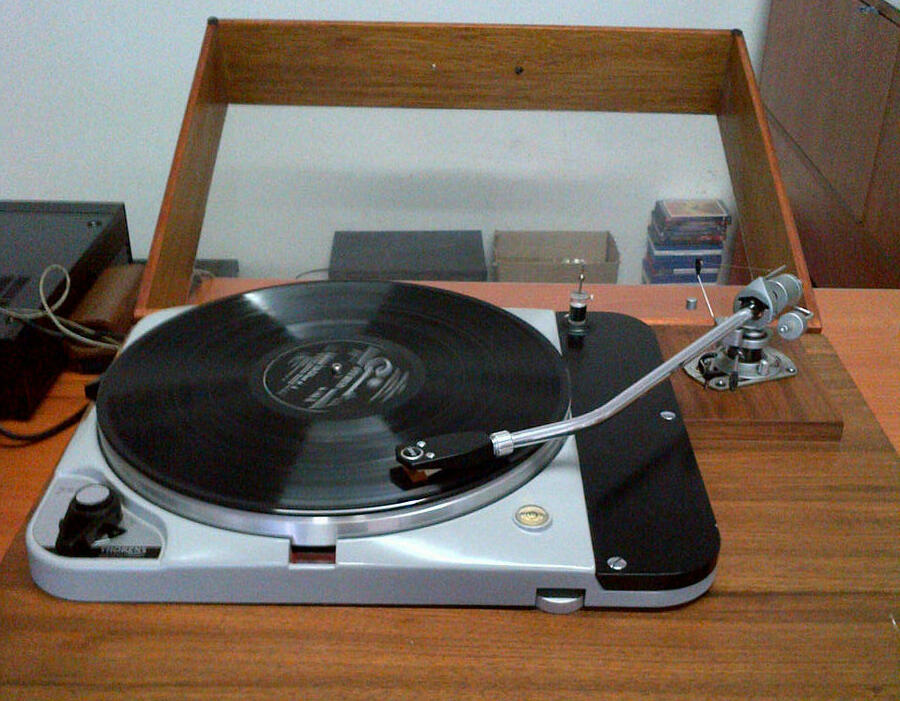
An SME 3012 tonearm fitted on a Thorens TD124 MkII turntable

A typical modern turntable, showing the curved tonearm with a headshell at the end, under which lies the magnetic cartridge and its attached stylus touching down on the grooves of a black record placed on the turntable's platter

The arm carrying the pickup is known as the tonearm. Ideally,

- the tonearm tracks the groove without distorting the stylus assembly
- the arm does not oscillate following a displacement, so it should either be both light and very stiff, or suitably damped
- the arm does not resonate with vibrations induced by the stylus or from the turntable motor or plinth, so it must be heavy enough to be immune to those vibrations, or it must be damped to absorb them
- the arm keeps the cartridge stylus tangential to the groove as it moves across the record, with minimal variation in angle.

Quality arms employ an adjustable counterweight to offset the mass of the arm and various cartridges and headshells. On this counterweight, a calibrated dial enables easy adjustment of stylus force. After perfectly balancing the arm, the dial itself is "zeroed"; the stylus force can then be dialed in by screwing the counterweight towards the fulcrum.

Tonearms are prone to two types of tracking errors that affect the sound. As the tonearm tracks the groove, the stylus exerts a frictional force tangent to the arc of the groove, and since this force does not intersect the tonearm pivot, a clockwise rotational force (moment) occurs and a reaction skating force is exerted on the stylus by the record groove wall away from center of the disc. Modern arms provide an anti-skate mechanism, using springs, hanging weights, or magnets to produce an offsetting counter-clockwise force at the pivot, making the net lateral force on the groove walls near zero.

The second error occurs as the arm sweeps in an arc across the disc, causing the angle between the cartridge head and groove to change slightly. A change in angle, albeit small, will affect the sound.

=== Linear tracking ===
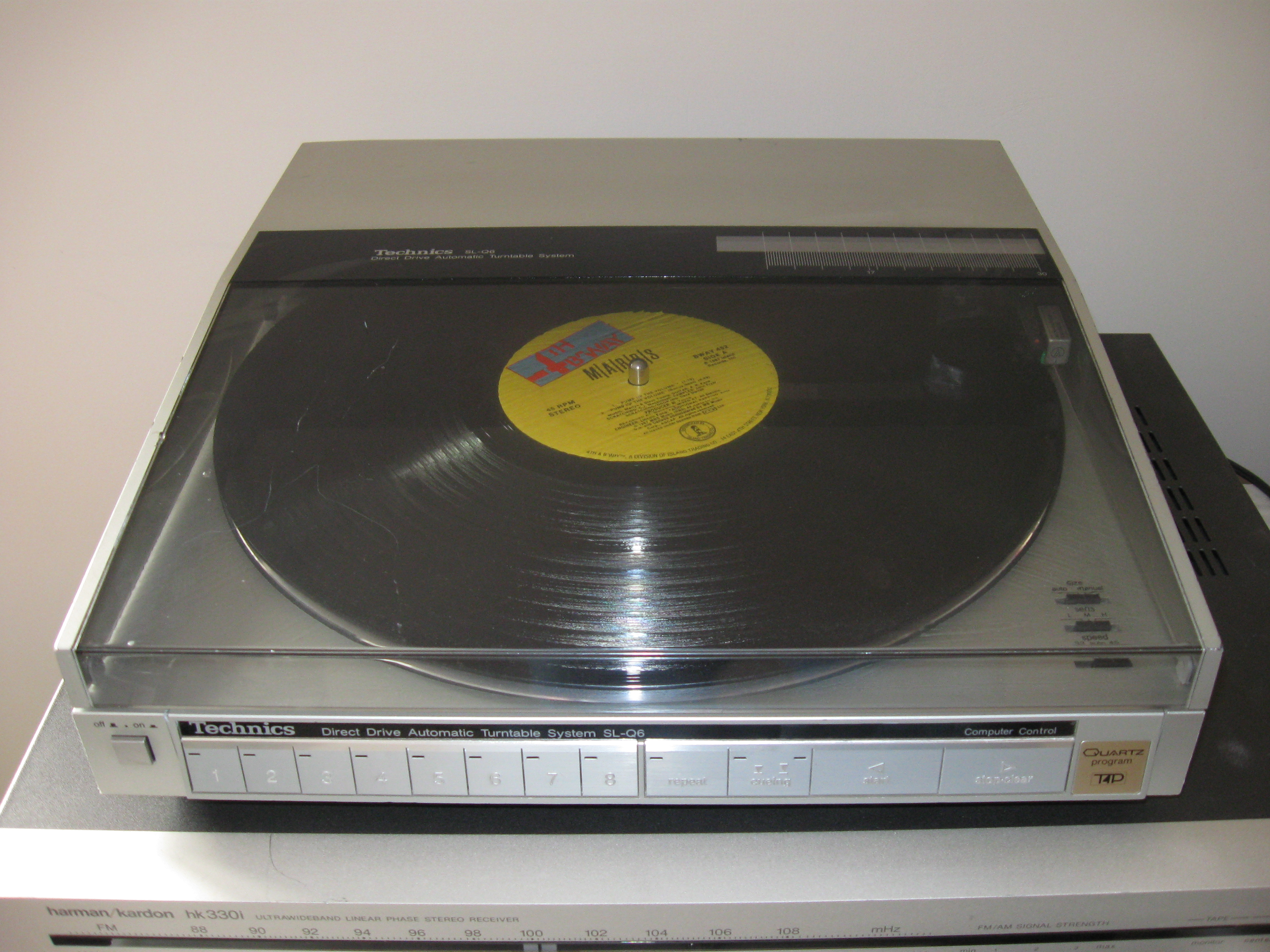
Technics SL-Q6 linear tracking turntable

If the arm is not pivoted, but instead carries the stylus along a radius of the disc, there is no tracking error and no skating; such arms are known as linear tracking or tangential arms. They need to be moved tangentially at a speed which matches the pitch of the record (the spacing between the grooves), which is technically complicated. More affordable tangential arms use a servo system; high-end systems use an air bearing, with the arm riding without friction on a cushion of air.

=== Cue lever ===
Many turntables have a "cue lever", a device that mechanically lowers the tonearm on to the record. It enables the user to locate an individual track more easily, to pause a record, and to avoid the risk of scratching the record.

== Pickup systems ==
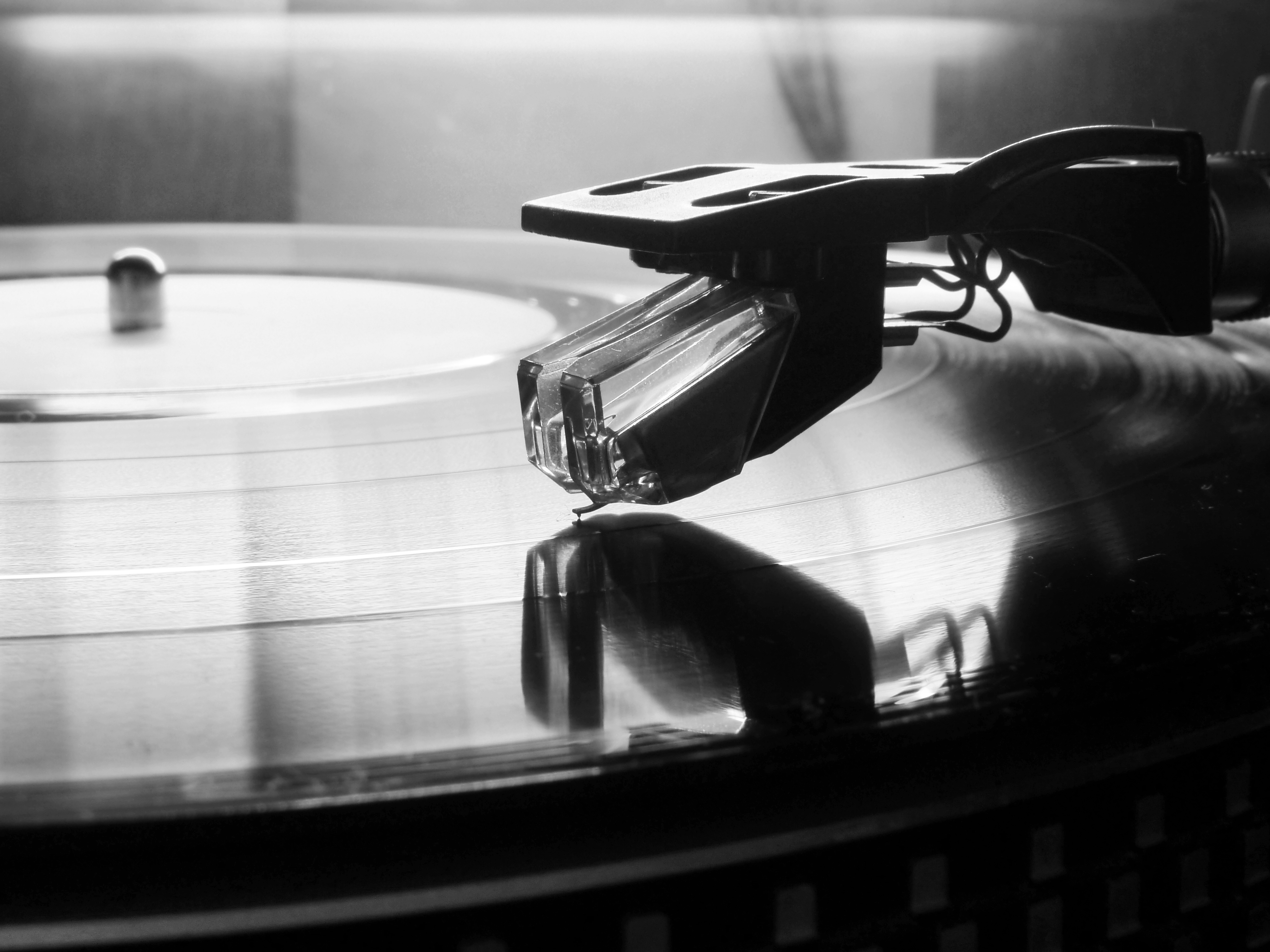
Typical magnetic cartridge

The pickup, or cartridge, is a transducer that converts mechanical vibrations from a stylus into an electrical signal. The electrical signal is amplified and converted into sound by one or more loudspeakers. Crystal and ceramic pickups that use the piezoelectric effect have largely been replaced by magnetic cartridges.

The pickup includes a stylus with a small diamond or sapphire tip that runs in the record groove. The stylus eventually becomes worn by contact with the groove, and it is usually replaceable.

Styli are classified as spherical or elliptical, although the tip is actually shaped as a half-sphere or a half-ellipsoid. Spherical styli are generally more robust than other types, but do not follow the groove as accurately, giving diminished high frequency response. Elliptical styli usually track the groove more accurately, with increased high frequency response and less distortion. For DJ use, the relative robustness of spherical styli make them generally preferred for back-cuing and scratching. There are a number of derivations of the basic elliptical type, including the Shibata or fine line stylus, which can more accurately reproduce high frequency information contained in the record groove. This is especially important for playback of quadraphonic recordings.

=== Optical readout ===
A few specialist laser turntables read the groove optically using a laser pickup. Since there is no physical contact with the record, no wear is incurred. However, this advantage is debatable, since vinyl records have been tested to withstand even 1200 plays with no significant audio degradation, provided that it is played with a high-quality cartridge and that the surfaces are clean. The disadvantage of the laser turntable is that the record must be extremely clean, lest the laser audibly "play" surface dust and debris that would normally be pushed aside by a mechanical stylus.

An alternative approach is to take a high-resolution photograph or scan of each side of the record and interpret the image of the grooves using computer software. An amateur attempt using a flatbed scanner lacked satisfactory fidelity. A professional system employed by the Library of Congress produces excellent quality. The system has the potential to recover and reconstruct recordings from fragile shellac discs that have broken into pieces.

== Stylus ==
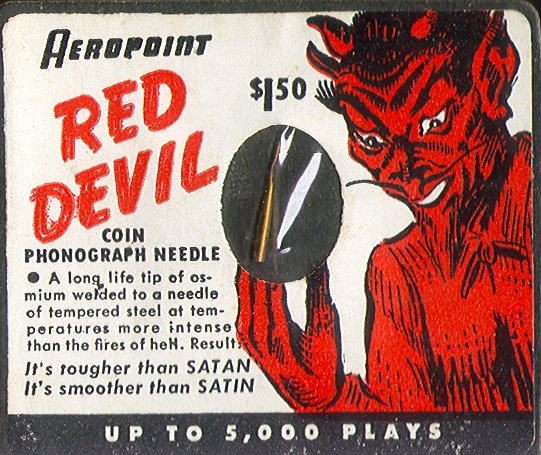
Stylus for jukebox using shellac 78-rpm records, 1940s

A development in stylus form came about by the attention to the CD-4 quadraphonic sound modulation process, which requires up to 50 kHz frequency response, with cartridges like Technics EPC-100CMK4 capable of playback on frequencies up to 100 kHz. This requires a stylus with a narrow side radius, such as 5 micrometres (0.2 mils). A narrow-profile elliptical stylus is able to read the higher frequencies (greater than 20 kHz), but at an increased wear, since the contact surface is narrower. For overcoming this problem, the Shibata stylus was invented around 1972 in Japan by Norio Shibata of JVC.

The Shibata-designed stylus offers a greater contact surface with the groove, which in turn means less pressure over the vinyl surface and thus less wear. A positive side effect is that the greater contact surface also means the stylus reads sections of the vinyl that were not worn by the common spherical stylus. In a demonstration by JVC records worn after 500 plays at a relatively high 4.5 g tracking force with a spherical stylus, played perfectly with the Shibata profile.

Other advanced stylus shapes appeared following the same goal of increasing contact surface, improving on the Shibata. Chronologically: "Hughes" Shibata variant (1975), "Ogura" (1978), Van den Hul (1982). Such a stylus may be marketed as "Hyperelliptical" (Shure), "Alliptic", "Fine Line" (Ortofon), "Line contact" (Audio Technica), "Polyhedron", "LAC", or "Stereohedron" (Stanton).

A keel-shaped diamond stylus appeared as a byproduct of the invention of the CED Videodisc. This, together with laser-diamond-cutting technologies, made possible the "ridge" shaped stylus, such as the Namiki (1985) design, and Fritz Gyger (1989) design. This type of stylus is marketed as "MicroLine" (Audio technica), "Micro-Ridge" (Shure), or "Replicant" (Ortofon).

To address the problem of steel needle wear upon records, which resulted in the cracking of the latter, RCA Victor devised unbreakable records in 1930, by mixing polyvinyl chloride with plasticisers, in a proprietary formula they called Victrolac, which was first used in 1931, in motion picture discs.

== Equalization ==
Since the late 1950s, almost all phono input stages have used the RIAA equalization standard. Before settling on that standard, there were many different equalizations in use, including EMI, His Master's Voice, Columbia, Decca FFRR, NAB, Ortho, BBC transcription, etc. Recordings made using these other equalization schemes typically sound odd if they are played through a RIAA-equalized preamplifier called a "phono stage". High-performance (so-called "multicurve disc") phono stages, which include multiple, selectable equalizations, are no longer commonly available. However, some vintage phono stages, such as the LEAK varislope series, are still obtainable and can be refurbished. Newer phono stages like the Esoteric Sound Re-Equalizer or the K-A-B MK2 Vintage Signal Processor are also available.

== Contemporary use and models ==
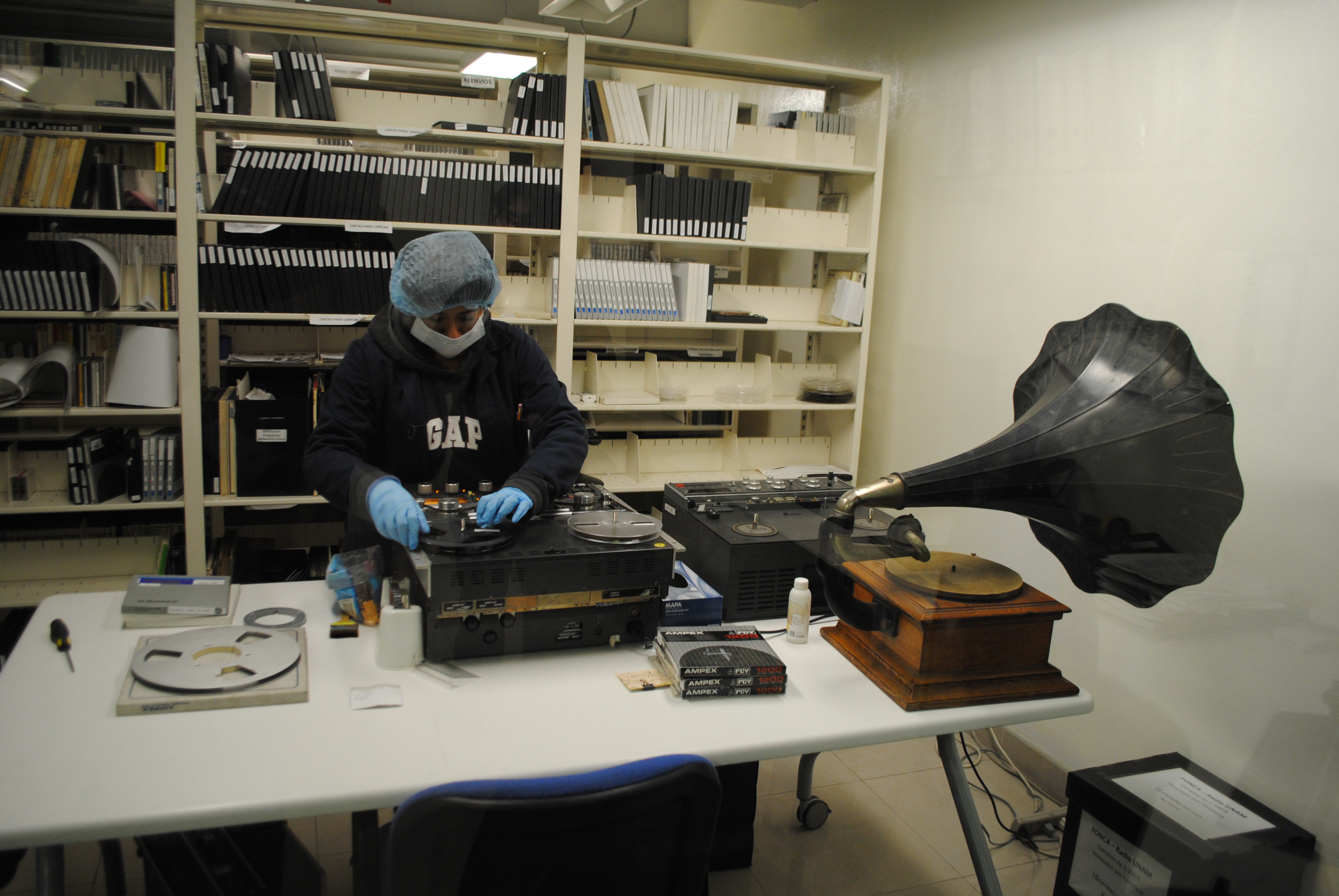
An old phonograph for record preservation at Fonoteca Nacional (National Sound Archive of Mexico)

Although largely replaced since the introduction of the compact disc in 1982, record albums still sold in small numbers throughout the 1980s and 1990s, but gradually sidelined in favor of CD players and tape decks in home audio environments. Record players continued to be manufactured and sold into the 21st century, although in small numbers and mainly for DJs. Following a resurgence in sales of records since the late 2000s, an increasing number of turntables have been manufactured and sold. Notably, Japanese company Panasonic brought back its well-known advanced Technics SL-1200 at the 2016 Consumer Electronics Show during which Sony also headlined a turntable, amid increasing interest in the format. Similarly, Audio-Technica revived its 1980s Sound Burger portable player in 2023.

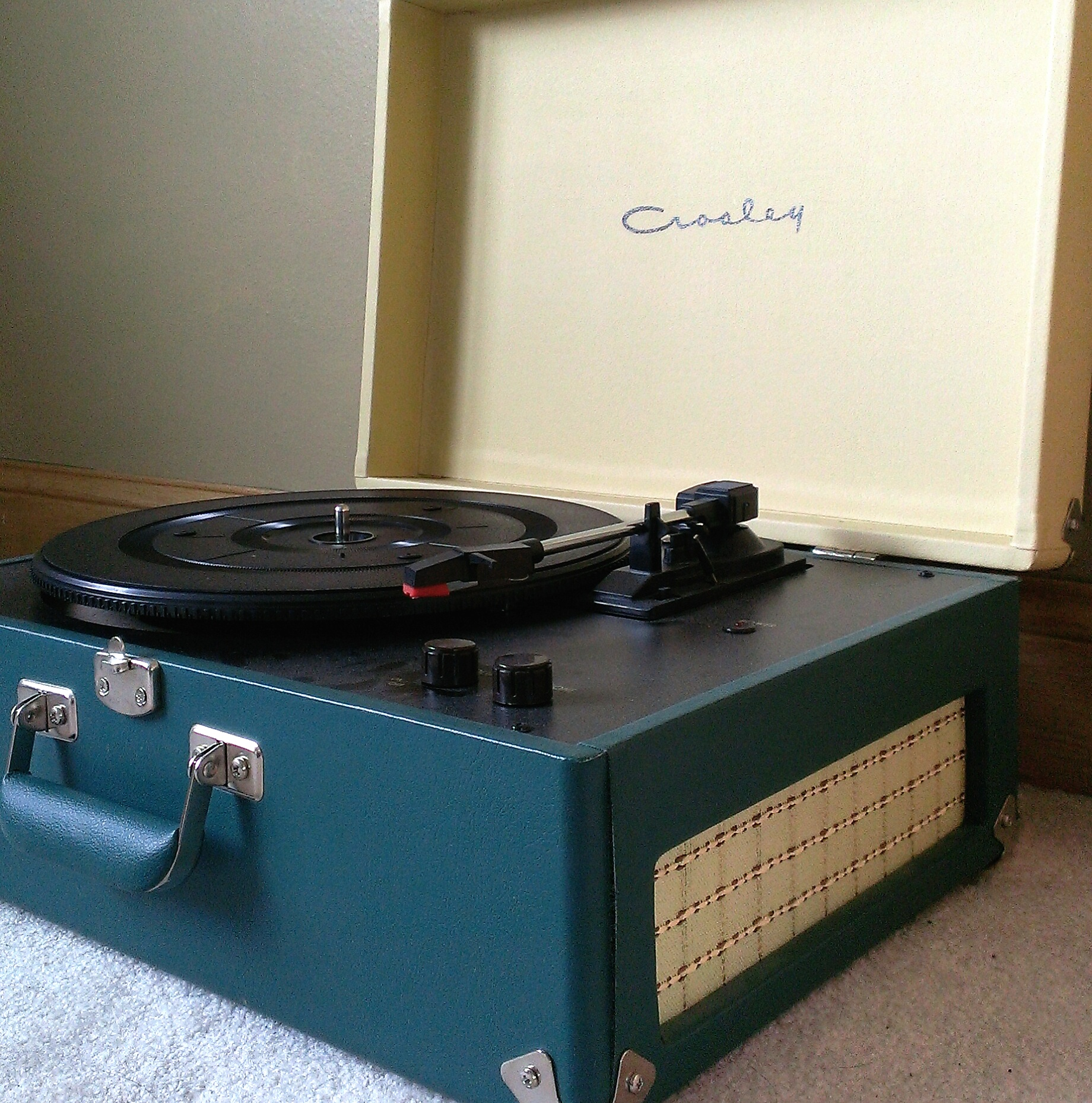
A Crosley retro-styled suitcase record player produced in c. 2013

At the low-end of the market, Crosley has been especially popular with its suitcase record players and have played a big part in the vinyl revival and its adoption among younger people and children in the 2010s.

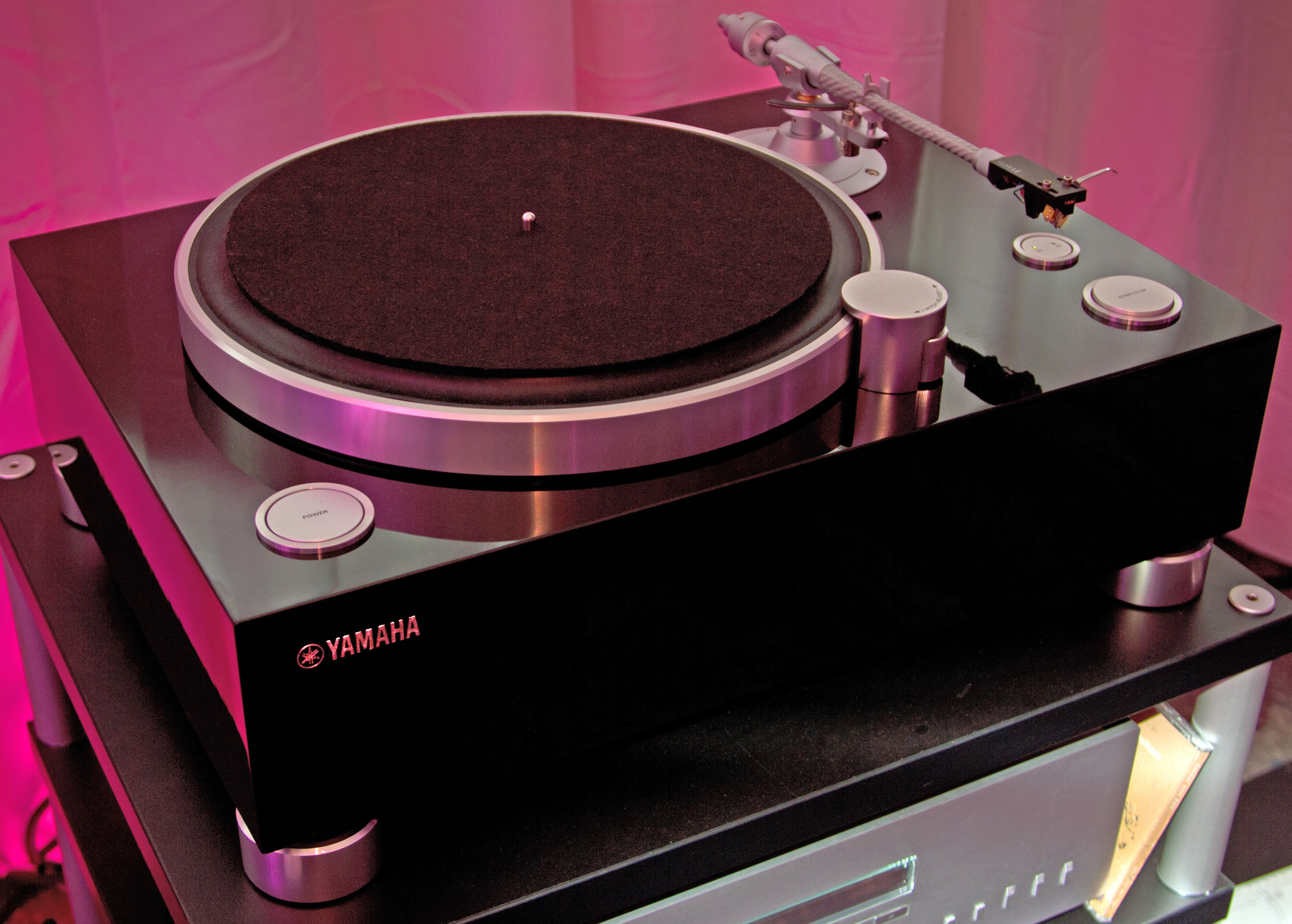
A mid-range Yamaha turntable, c. 2019

New interest in records has led to the development of turntables with additional modern features. USB turntables have a built-in audio interface, which transfers the analog sound directly to the connected computer. Some USB turntables transfer the audio without equalization, but are sold with software that allows the EQ of the transferred audio file to be adjusted. There are also many turntables on the market designed to be plugged into a computer via a USB port for needle dropping purposes.

Some modern turntables include Bluetooth output, enabling wireless playback through compatible speakers. Sony have also released a high-end turntable with an analog-to-digital converter to convert the sound from a playing record into a 24-bit high-resolution audio file in DSD or WAV formats.

== See also ==
- Phonograph record
- Phonograph cylinder
- Archéophone, used to convert diverse types of cylinder recordings to modern, discrete recording formats
- Audio signal processing
- Compressed air gramophone
- List of phonograph manufacturers
- Talking Machine World
- Vinyl killer
- Turntablism
