= Turntable anti-skating =

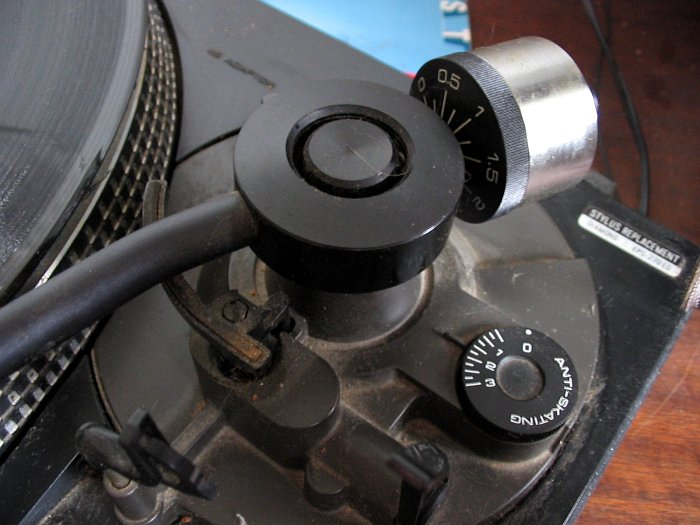
A tonearm with the dial for anti-skating adjustment.

Turntable anti-skating is a feature used in phonograph turntables to prevent skating of the tonearm.

Due to the offset between the cartridge's axis (which is approximately tangential to the disk) and the tonearm's pivot, the force applied (through friction) by the rotating disk to the cartridge tends to draw the tonearm toward the center of the record and distort the balance of the sound and of the wear suffered by the stylus and the vinyl groove. To prevent this, an appropriately-sized opposing force (a rotational torque) is applied at the tonearm. This is accomplished in various ways by dedicated mechanisms, depending on the tonearm's manufacturer, and ranging from a small counterweight adjustable by a knob, to adjustable spring or magnetic mechanisms, usually calibrated in grams of force.

Note that while the angular velocity is, ideally, constant, the peripheral velocity of the moving groove against the stylus is not, varying for instance from approximately 50 cm/s down to 15 cm/s from start to finish of a 33 rpm, 12" (30.48cm) record. The angle of skew of the stylus cartridge with respect to a chord of the circular record (and groove) while the tonearm rests on the record is also variable. Thus, any opposing force applied to the tonearm to counteract skating, if not variable during the playing of the record, is fixed, and at best an average value, only really perfectly in balance with the skating force at just one unique radius from the center of the disk. Yet, anti-skating schemes perform a useful function in minimizing asymmetric wear of styli and grooves, although not eliminating it entirely.

Linear-tracking turntables were invented in part to eliminate the possibility of skating.
