= Technics SL-J2 =

The Technics SL-J2 is a quartz-controlled direct-drive fully automatic turntable system produced by Technics between 1984 and 1988. It features a linear tracking tonearm with an optical sensor that allows for the kind of track-skipping more typical of CD players. The sensor also detects the size of the record sitting on the platter (7-inch or 12-inch), which allows the needle to drop precisely on the first track. 10-inch records must be played manually.

== Product description ==
From the original Technics SL-J2 brochure:

"Who else but Technics could put so much high performance, and so many convenient features in such a slim body? The SL-J2 features the outstanding rotational speed accuracy of quartz-referenced direct drive, and a linear tracking tonearm for perfect tracing accuracy. The convenient skip/search/direct access function allows you to skip over selections you don't want to hear. A separate, easy-to-read Music Select LED confirms your skip/search commands."

== Features ==
Also from the original SL-J2 brochure:

- Linear tracking tonearm with optoelectronic sensor detects any arm angle deflection, and automatically compensates to give optimum tracking performance
- Gimbal suspension system with low-friction ball-bearings gives superb tracking ability
- Equipped with the Technics-designed P-Mount cartridge connector system
- Automatic operation. The SL-J2 automatically selects record size and speed. All function keys are on the front panel, so operation can be carried out with the dust cover closed
- 30cm (12") diameter aluminum diecast platter
- TNRC cabinet for effective protection against external vibrations and acoustic feedback
- Manual switching of disc size and speed to accommodate non-standard record formats
- Automatic stylus muting

== Technical specifications ==
Type: fully automatic turntable
Drive method: direct drive
Motor: DC motor
Drive control: quartz phase locked
Platter: 300mm aluminium die-cast
Speeds: 33 and 45rpm
Wow and flutter: 0.025% WRMS
Rumble: -78dB
Tonearm: linear tracking tonearm with 4-pivot gimbal suspension
Effective length: 105mm
Cartridge: moving magnet
Tracking force: 1.25g (+-0.25g)
Replacement stylus: EPS-30ES
Dimensions: 315 x 88 x 315mm
Weight: 4.3kg

== Similar models ==
The Technics SL-10, produced by Technics between 1981 and 1985, was the first linear-tracking turntable to feature direct drive.

The SL-10 is also notable for being in the permanent collection of the Museum of Modern Art in New York.

Other direct-drive linear tracking turntables produced by Technics include the SL-15, SL-7, SL-6, SL-5, and SL-V5.
