= TT1650 =

The TT1650 is a direct-drive turntable manufactured by Numark.

== Features ==
- Direct Drive motor with 1 kg of torque
- Battle and club style design (dual start/stop buttons)
- Removable target light
- Lightweight aluminum platter
- Detachable power and audio connections
- 33 rpm or 45 rpm
- Pitch Control +/- 10%
