= Audio-Technica AT-LP120 =

Record-player made by Audio-Technica

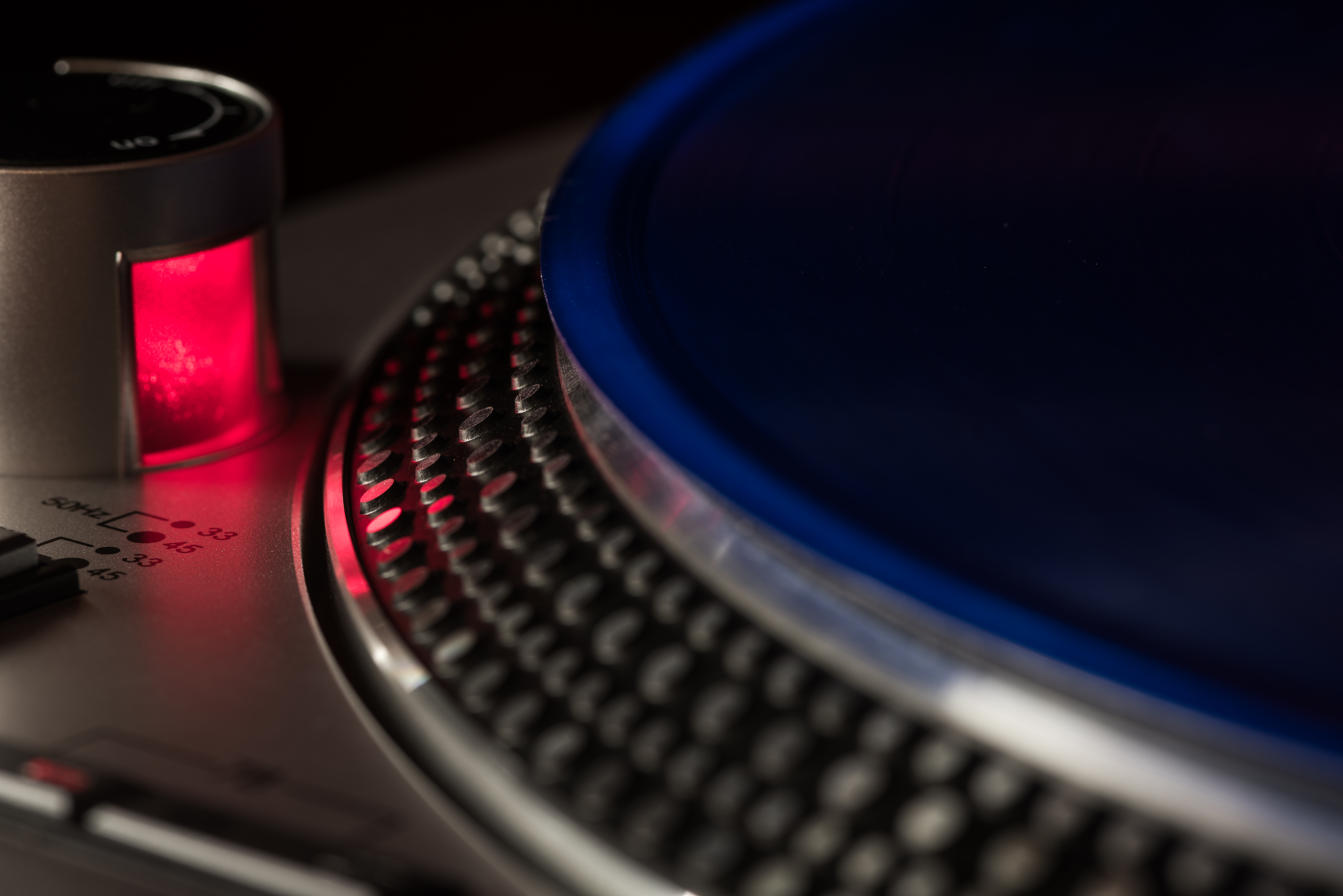
- Type: Direct-drive turntable
- Inception: 2009
- Manufacturer: Audio-Technica
- Models: AT-LP120-USB, AT-LP120BK-USB
- Website: Product website

The Audio-Technica AT-LP120, currently sold as the AT-LP120X, is a mid-range direct-drive turntable introduced in 2009 by the Japanese audio equipment manufacturer Audio-Technica. The AT-LP120 was intended to be a viable replacement for the long-running Technics SL-1200 series of turntables that was set to be discontinued in 2010. It supports both phono and line-level output, using a built-in preamplifier.

The turntable also has the ability to dub records directly to a computer in real-time using a USB connection.

At the January 2019 Consumer Electronics Show, an updated version called the AT-LP120XUSB was announced by Audio Technica. According to the company, the new model includes an improved internal preamp, Bluetooth capabilities, and comes with the company's updated VM95E cartridge. The original AT-LP120 model has since been discontinued.

== Similarities to the SL-1200 ==
Since it was designed to mimic the Technics SL-1200 series of turntables, the AT-120 shares many design traits with the older Technics models, including:

- Metal construction
- Pop-up target light
- S-shaped tonearm
- Built-in strobe speed indicator
- Quartz speed lock

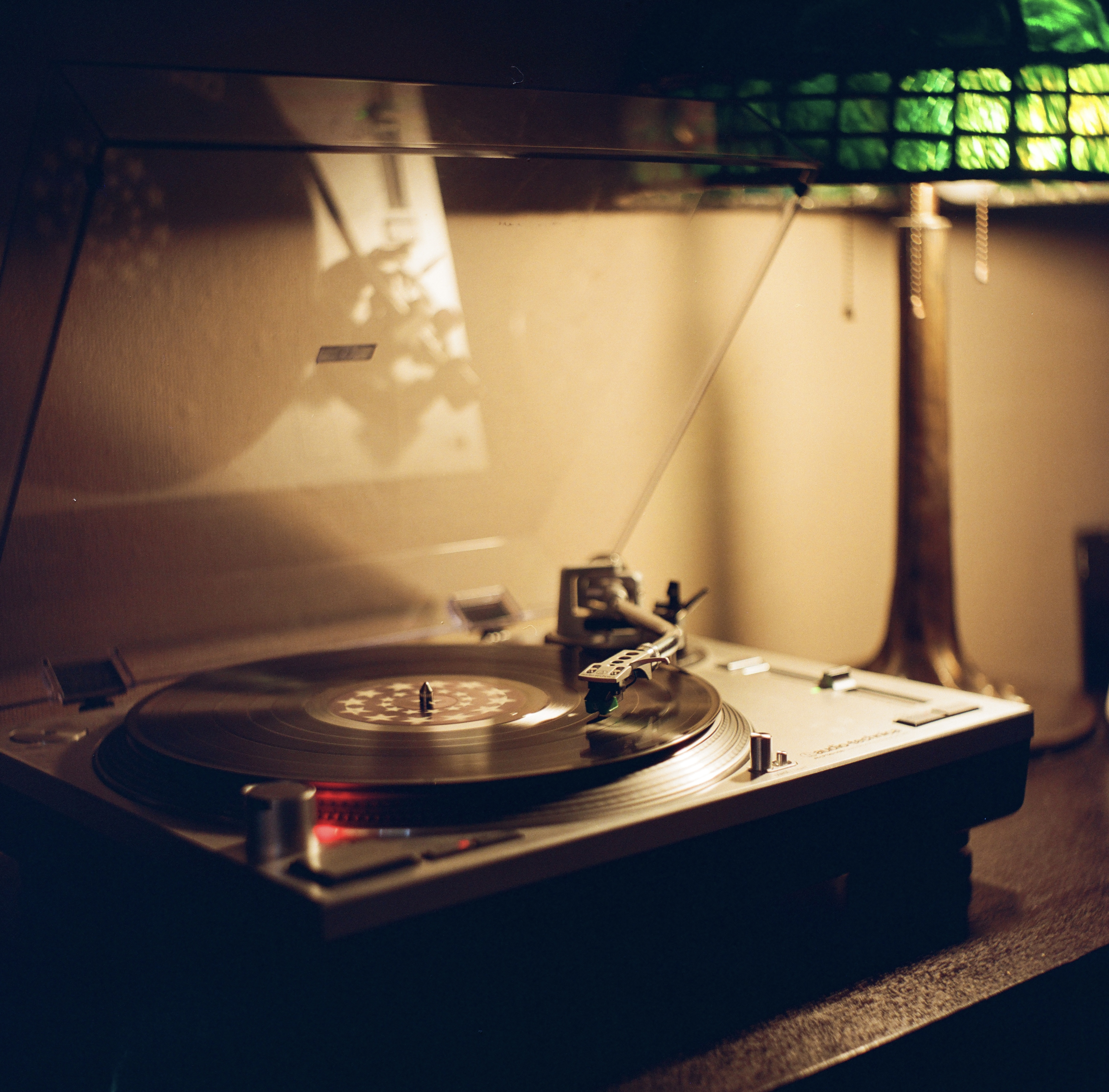
AT-LP120

== Specifications ==
| Type: | 3-Speed, fully manual operation |
| Motor: | DC motor |
| Drive method: | Direct drive |
| Speeds: | 33 1/3 RPM, 45 RPM, 78 RPM |
| Pitch variation: | +/- 10% or +/-20% |
| Dimensions: | 17.72" W x 13.86" D x 6.1" H |
| Cartridge: | Audio-Technica AT95E |
| USB Function: | 16-bit @ 44.1 or 48 kHz sample rate USB 1.1 compliant |
