= Technics SL-1200 =

Series of direct-drive turntables

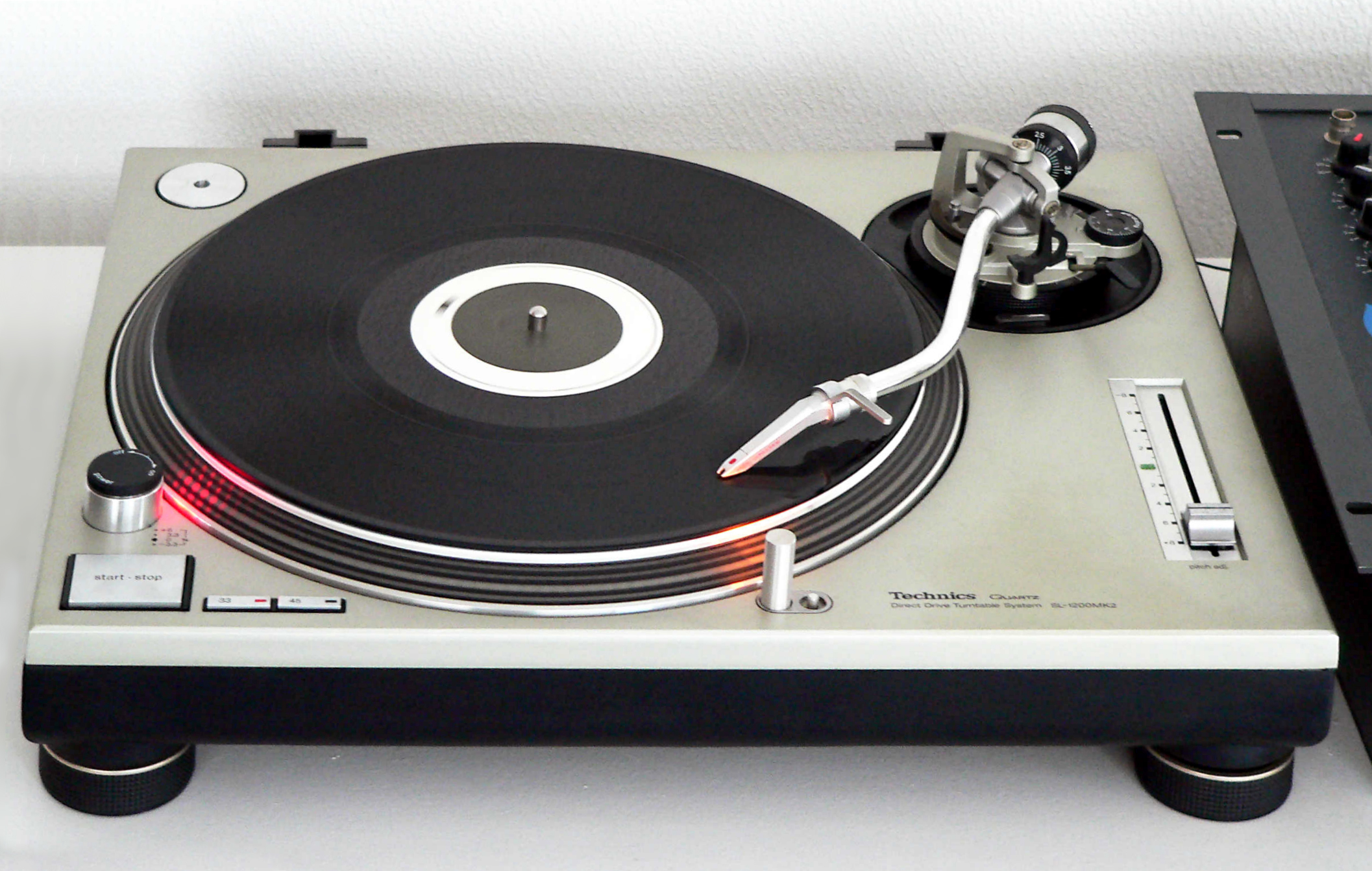
- Technics SL-1200 turntable in use
- Type: Turntable
- Inventor: Matsushita Electric
- Inception: 1972
- Manufacturer: Technics (a brand of Panasonic Corporation)
- Available: 1972–2010, 2016–present
- Website: SL-1200 Series Brand Site

The Technics SL-1200 is a series of direct-drive turntables introduced in October 1972 by Matsushita Electric (now Panasonic Corporation) under the brand name Technics. The series is widely recognized as influencing the emergence of hip hop, turntablism, and electronic music culture in the 1980s.

As the use of slipmats for cueing and beat-mixing became popular in live DJ performances, the quartz-controlled motor system enabled records to be mixed with consistency. Its control over wow and flutter and minimized resonance made the equipment particularly suitable for use in nightclubs and other public-address applications. Since its release in 1979, the SL-1200MK2 and its successors have been the most common turntables for DJing and scratching. With more than 3 million units sold, many 1970s units are still in heavy use.

At the London Science Museum, an SL-1210MK2 is on display as one of the pieces of technology that was responsible for "making the Modern World".

== History ==
The SL-1200 was developed in 1971 by a team led by Shuichi Obata at Matsushita and was released to the market in 1972. It was adopted by New York City hip hop DJs, including Grandmaster Flash in the 1970s. As they experimented with the SL-1200 decks, DJs developed scratching techniques when they found that the motor would continue to spin at the correct RPM even if the DJ wiggled the record back and forth on the platter.

On November 1, 2010, Panasonic announced the discontinuation of Technics analog turntables through a statement on the DMC World DJ Championships home page.

Technics was relaunched in 2014, focusing on higher-end products. Reports at the time suggested that Panasonic had plans for Technics to reintroduce turntables, preceding the announcement of the SL-1200 series revival at the 2016 Consumer Electronics Show under two "Grand Class" models: the limited-edition 1200GAE (1,200 units worldwide) and the consumer-grade 1200G. They later introduced the lighter, more affordable 1200GR, followed by the DJ-focused SL-1200MK7 in 2019.

=== SL1200/SL1210 re-launch ===
Due to the increasing popularity of vinyl among DJs, a petition was created calling for the re-launch of the Technics SL1200 and SL1210 series turntables. On 5 January 2016, Technics agreed to relaunch both the SL-1200G and the SL-1200GAE.

At the 2016 Consumer Electronics Show (CES) in Las Vegas, Panasonic announced it would be resuming production with a new line of turntables, beginning with the limited edition SL-1200GAE.

At the 2019 CES, Panasonic confirmed the future production of a new turntable, the SL-1200MK7, in matte black. As well as the addition of new features and fixes to known issues with previous models. The new model featured an all-new, lighter construction of aluminum and fiberglass.

In 2021, Panasonic ceased manufacturing Technics turntables in Japan and moved all turntable production to Malaysia.

== Design ==
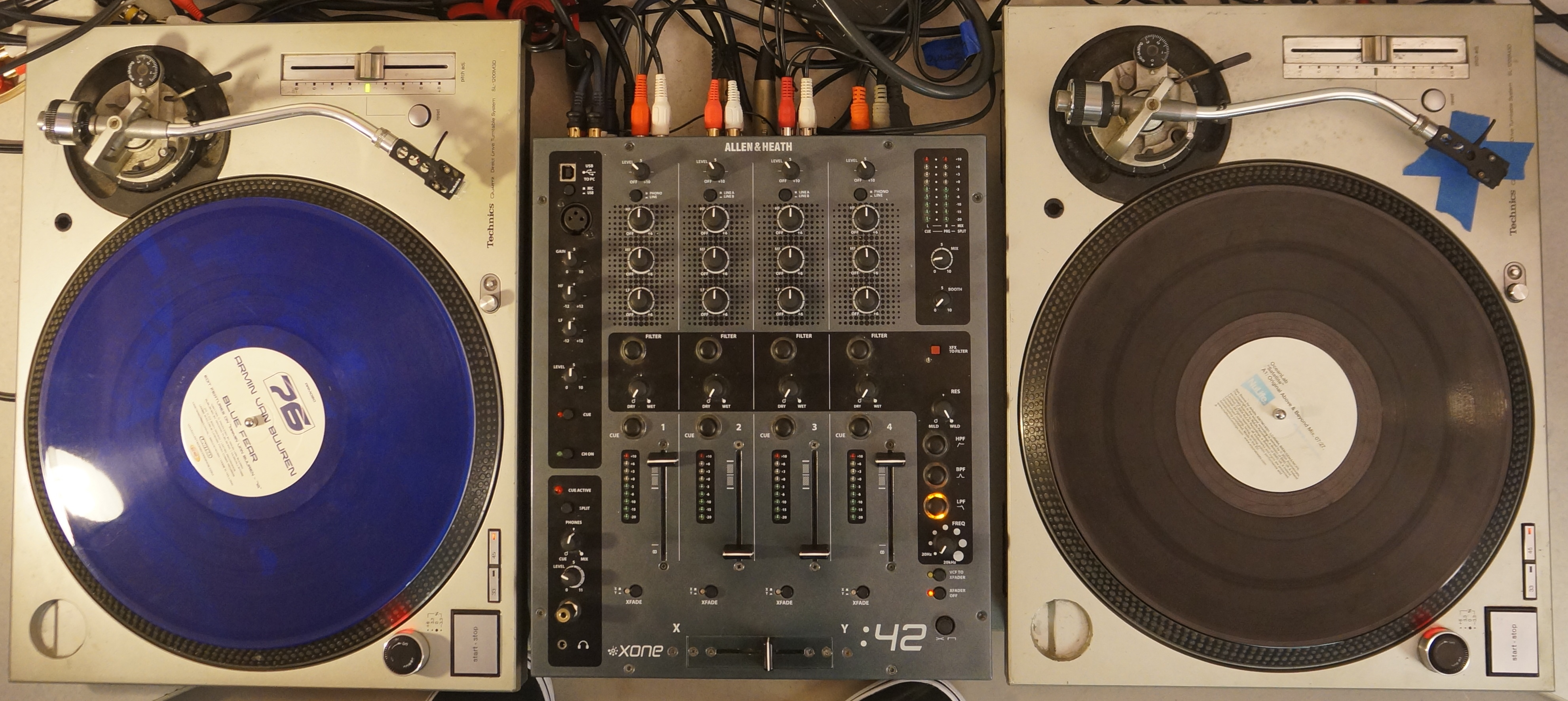
Two SL-1200M3Ds set up for DJ battle, or scratching, mixing. An Allen & Heath 4-Channel with Effects Mixer sits between the two turntables, allowing shorter travel during battles or competitions.

The SL-1200 series was developed by Technics' parent company, Matsushita, to address several challenges associated with turntable design. The design incorporates a heavy base made of a composite structure featuring a cast alloy top plate and a solid rubber base, intended to minimize unwanted vibrations. Adjustable rubber-damped feet provide insulation against acoustic feedback, particularly in environments where the turntable is used near loudspeakers. Additionally, the underside of the record platter is coated with a 1.2 mm layer of rubber to help reduce ringing. A 2 mm rubber mat is included with the platter, which is designed to reduce resonance around 250 Hz.

The drive system designed by Matsushita is direct-drive, rather than the more commonly found belt-drive type. The direct-drive design, which was developed to reduce wow and flutter, produces a substantially quieter turntable that has minimal motor and bearing noise, although the bearing rumble is "characteristic" of well-used turntables.

On the underside of the platter, a large magnet is placed over the spindle, surrounding the coils and forming the motor drive, which eliminates loss through power transfer. The SL-1200 utilizes a Frequency Generator Servo Control Quartz Lock system that is claimed to produce "the most accurate and consistent speed possible". The system is immune to static and dynamic stylus drag, which otherwise causes unwanted speed variances that change the pitch and tempo of the music.

== Legacy models ==
=== Original model (1972) ===
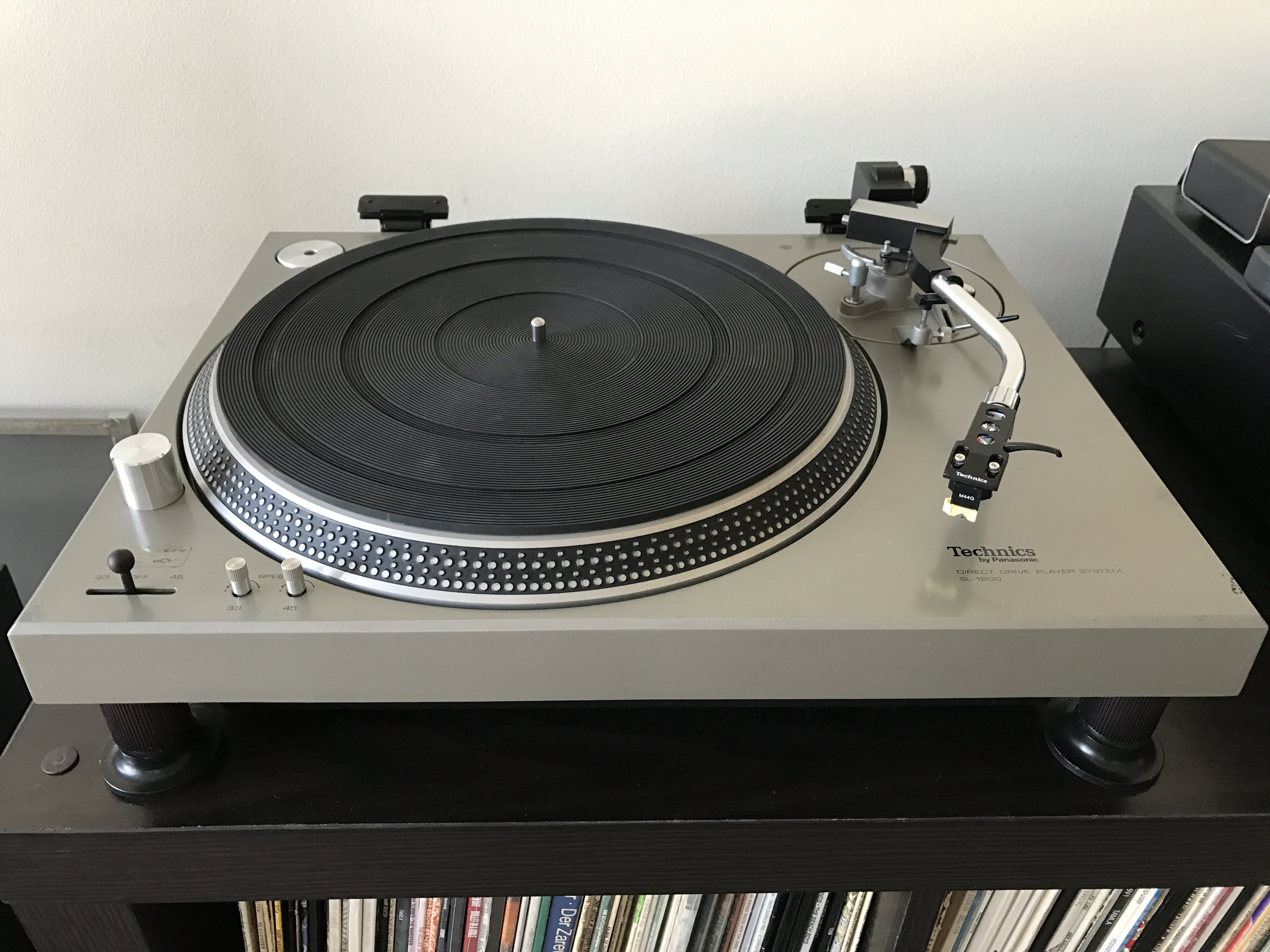
The original SL-1200 from 1972

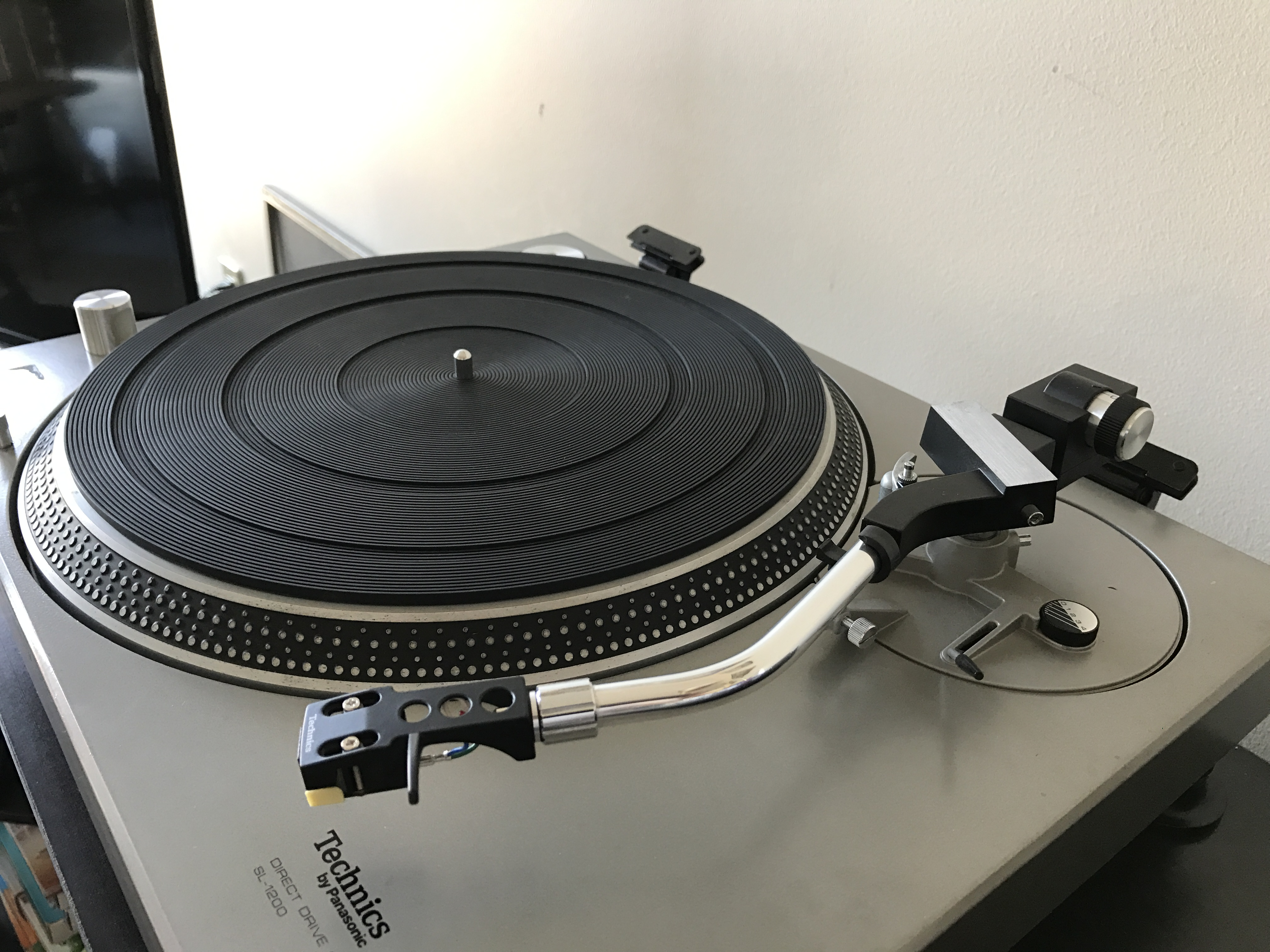
The Technics EPA-120 tonearm was standard equipment on the original SL-1200 and was significantly different from the tonearm introduced with the MK2 and subsequent models.

==== SL-1200 ====
The SL-1200 was introduced in 1972 as an evolution of the popular SL-1100. It was dubbed "The Middle Class Player System." It was released in two versions: the SL-1200 and the SL-120. The SL-1200 included a tonearm section, while the SL-120 did not.

=== MK2 models (1979-2010) ===
The SL-1200 Mark 2 was introduced in 1979 as an update to the SL-1200. It was dubbed "The Middle Class Quartz Direct Drive": the main technical improvement over the MK1 series was that the electronic braking system, when reducing speed, exhibited response times identical to those observed during acceleration. This characteristic made the entire MK2 series particularly well suited for the “pitch riding” technique used by DJs to beatmatch two records. It soon found its way into discos as well as radio stations for airplay because of its vibration-damping ability and resistance to feedback, and eventually became popular with pioneering hip-hop DJs. Following their established formula, Technics offered different model numbers in Europe: the 1200 (silver) and the 1210 (matte black), which were equipped with switchable dual voltage (110V or 220V) power supplies. Initially, there were only silver models (all named 1200 MK2) in the official distribution in Japan and the US, single voltage of 100V/120V accordingly. However, later the 1200 was available in both silver and matte black finishes (in Japan, the introduction of the MK3 in 1989 marked the first official introduction of a black version).

==== SL-1200MK2 ====
Released in the summer of 1979, this model came in both silver and matte black. The matte black version was available for a limited time in the US market in a 2-pack, SL-1200MK2PK. Technics improved the motor and shock resistance and changed the rotary pitch control to a slider style. This became the base model and is the oldest model for which production continued until 2010. The older version of this model that was sold from 1979 until around 1983 has a large 4-inch-diameter (100 mm) plate where the RCA and ground wires enter the unit, while the newer version has a smaller 2-inch-diameter (51 mm) hole in the rubber where the RCA and ground enter. International versions of the SL-1200MK2 included switches for line voltage and frequency beneath the platter.

==== SL-1210MK2 ====
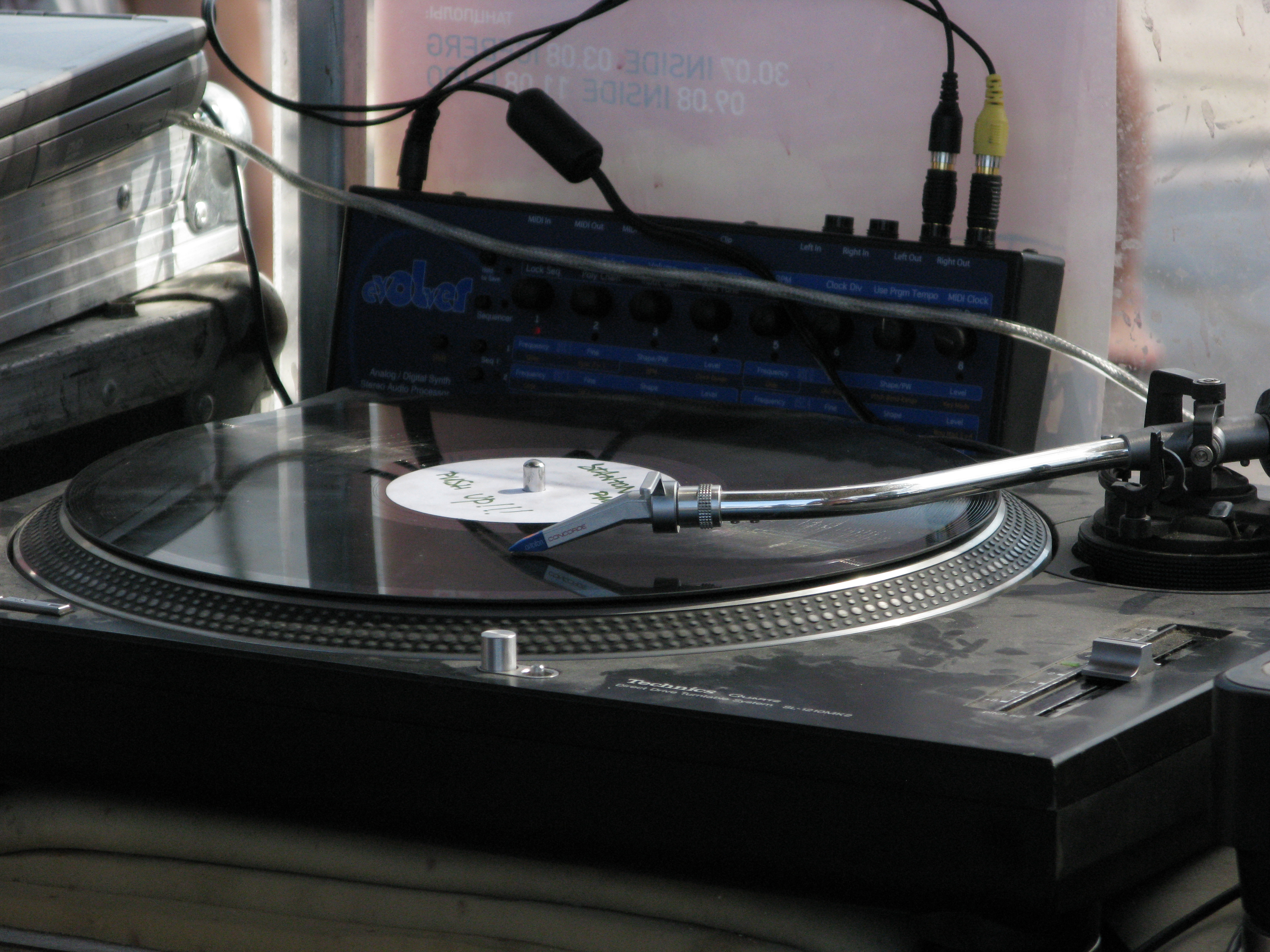
Technics SL-1210MK2, black metallic

This model came in a satin black metallic finish and is nearly the same in function as the SL-1200MK2, although some of the circuitry inside is updated to use fewer types of potentiometers and resistors. The Technics 1210 series also had a switch to change between voltages on the underside of the platter. It was not available from official Panasonic dealers in the United States.

=== MK3 models (1989-1997) ===
==== SL-1200MK3 ====
Released in 1989, it has a matte black finish like the MK2, gold RCA plugs, and a small gold-foil Technics label on the back. It was intended only for the Japanese market.

==== SL-1200MK3D ====
Manufactured for the Japanese market only, this version includes factory gold RCA cables, with a black or silver finish. It also includes a pitch reset button. This version was released in 1997.

==== SL-1200M3D ====
Released in 1997, this version has a silver finish like the MK2 (besides the silver finish, there are copies with a "champagne-ish" color). Its features include a detached dust cover (no hinges), a recessed power switch to prevent DJs from accidentally turning the deck off during use, and no self-locking detent ("click") at the zero point of the pitch adjustment slider, allowing more precise control of pitch near that point. It has a reset button that sets the pitch adjustment to zero, regardless of the actual position of the pitch adjustment slider. Specific to the M3D series, the brand and model label is printed in a single line instead of two, and the stroboscopic light is red with a slightly orange tone. This model also introduced a slot near the counterweight, allowing for storage of a second headshell. The MK3D was designed for Japanese markets, while the M3D without the K was European/US.

==== SL-1210M3D ====
This model is the same as the SL-1200M3D except with a matte black finish like the MK2.

=== MK4 models (1997) ===
==== SL-1200MK4 ====
The SL-1200MK4 was introduced in 1997.. It was an update to the SL-1200MK2. It was available only in Japan and priced at around $650. It has a matte-black finish. This model is aimed at the high-end audiophile market rather than DJs. It is the last model made with the detent ("click") in the neutral position (+/- 0%) of the pitch adjustment slider. In addition to the existing 33 rpm and 45 rpm buttons, the MK4 added a 78 rpm button. It is designed to be used with regular, removable RCA cables (along with a removable ground/earth cable) rather than hard-wired RCA cables like all other 1200/1210 models. The tonearm differed in appearance from those of previous models, featuring a titanium-coloured finish. Technics' Japanese operating manual specifies OFC internal tonearm wiring but does not identify the tonearm itself as being made of titanium.

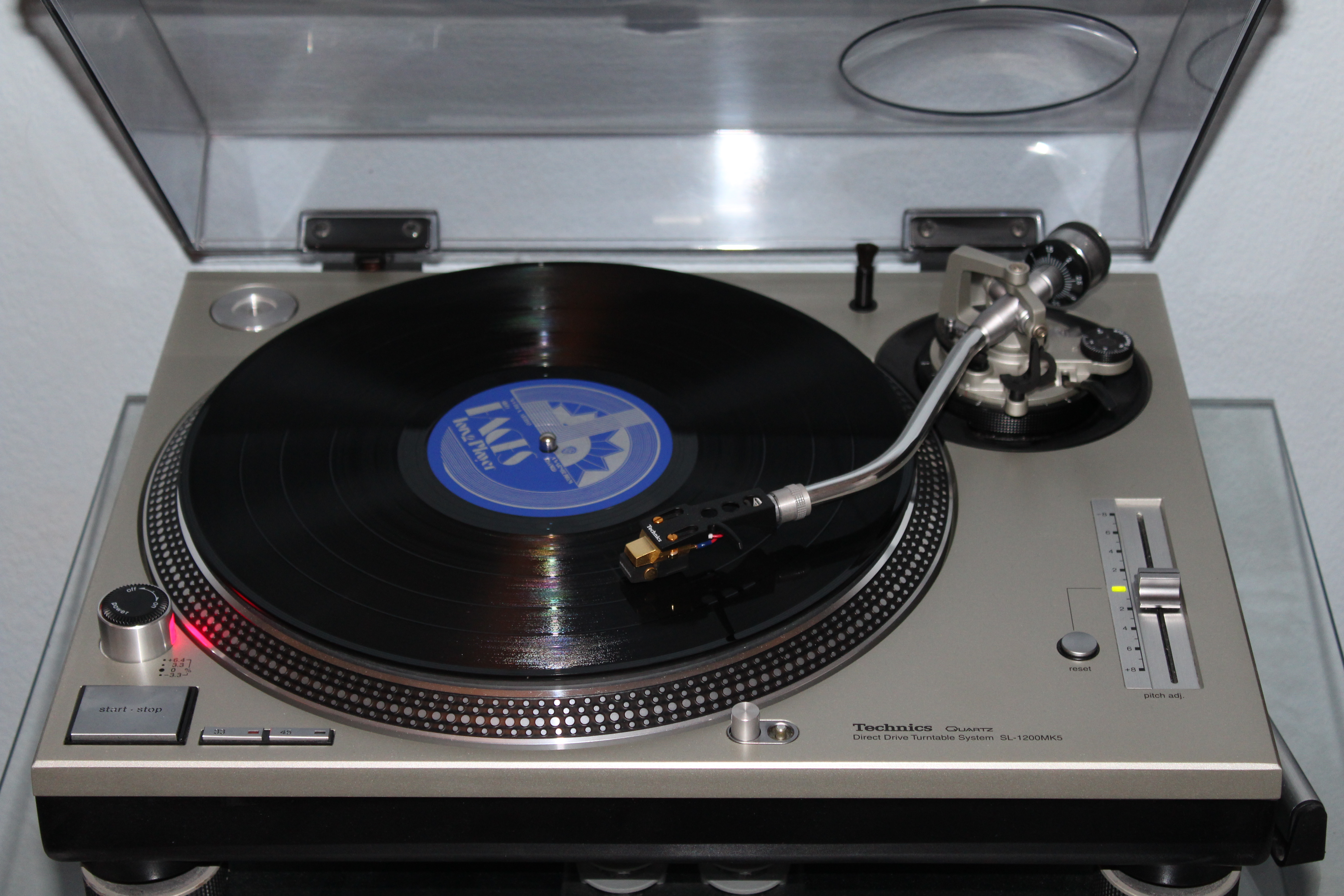
Technics SL-1200 MK5 playing a record

=== MK5 models (2000-2010) ===
==== SL-1200MK5 ====
Released on 1 November 2000, this model has a silver finish like the MK2. It includes an increased range of anti-skate settings, increasing the range from 0–3 grams-force (0–30 mN) of older models to 0–6 grams-force (0–60 mN) of this newer model. The 1200MK5 also has the voltage selector under the platter, like the previously improved upon '1210' models. Height adjustment can be set between 0 and 6mm. It carries over many of the improved features of the MK3D, like the lack of a 0-crossing quartz lock for better pitch control and the added spare cartridge holder. MK5 models have a removable lid, as opposed to the MK2 and MK3 removable hinged lid. The MK5 is the last 1200 model to retain an analog, quartz-clock-based pitch control. Brake speed can be adjusted by using a small screwdriver in a hole located below the turntable plate.

==== SL-1210MK5 ====
SL-1210MK5 has a black finish (noir) like the MK2, and is functionally exactly the same as the SL-1200MK5. This model is not to be confused with the M5G model.

==== SL-1200MK5G ====
Released in 2002, the 1200MK5G model (not to be confused with MK5 models) was the first Technics turntable to introduce a 'digitally controlled' pitch adjustment. With a typical pitch range between ±8%, the MK5G included the previous ±8% value, but with the addition of a ±16% button. The globe on the target light was changed from an incandescent bulb to a LED. See the SL-1210M5G section of this article for more detailed changes.

==== SL-1210M5G ====
Released on 1 November 2002, this model had a glossy black finish with silver speckles. It was a special 30th-anniversary edition. It was initially launched in Japan only (together with the MK5), but then became internationally available. The pitch adjustment switches between the ±8% and ±16% ranges, and the pitch control is digital. Digital pitch control became the standard for all 1200 models from this point on. It also features blue target lights and blue pitch-number illumination. Unlike previous models, the brake strength potentiometer is adjustable using a small plastic knob (although it is still located beneath the platter as with previous models). Minor improvements in this model versus previous MK2, MK3, MK4, and 1200LTD models include improved tonearm mounting and oxygen-free copper wire, improved vibration damping in the body, improved pitch control accuracy, and better LEDs. This version is available as a 120-volt model for the North American market.

=== MK6 models (2007-2008) ===
- SL-1200MK6-K & SL-1200MK6-S Released in February 2008 (in Japan) with minor improvements including improved tonearm mounting and oxygen-free copper wire, improved vibration damping in the body, improved pitch control accuracy, and better LEDs. The -S model has a silver finish like the MK2.
- SL-1200MK6K1 Released on 12 December 2007 (in Japan) as a special 35th-anniversary limited edition of 1200 units. It consisted of a standard black MK6 packaged with a booklet and gold record.

=== Special models ===
These were limited edition versions with 24-karat gold-plated metal parts, including tonearm and buttons. Many "non-official" special models of the SL-1200 and SL-1210 appeared over the years, mainly given away as prizes for turntablism. Most notably during the DMC World Championship, which awarded the winner a pair of 24K gold-plated Technics turntables. Due to the customization trend that has grown in the DJ community, many local events or competitions give away custom colored or finished units.

==== SL-1200LTD (1995) ====
The SL-1200 Limited Edition was introduced in 1995, commemorating two million units in sales. Only 5,000 units were made. Due to popular demand, an extra 500 units were said to be made at the end of the production run. Like the MK3D, it has a pitch reset button, but differs in that it also has a self-locking detent at the zero position of pitch adjustment. This model has a piano black gloss finish and gold-plated hardware. It was priced at about US$1200.

==== SL-1200GLD (2004) ====
Released in 2004, the 1200GLD was another limited-edition model, with only 3,000 units manufactured. Five hundred were released in Japan, with the rest split between the US and international markets. It is based on the MK5G model, with blue target lights (instead of the regular white), a piano black gloss finish, and gold-plated hardware. It was "created to commemorate the 3 Million turntables sold by Technics in the last 30 years".

== Current models ==
=== Grand Class SL-1200 Series (2016-2020) ===
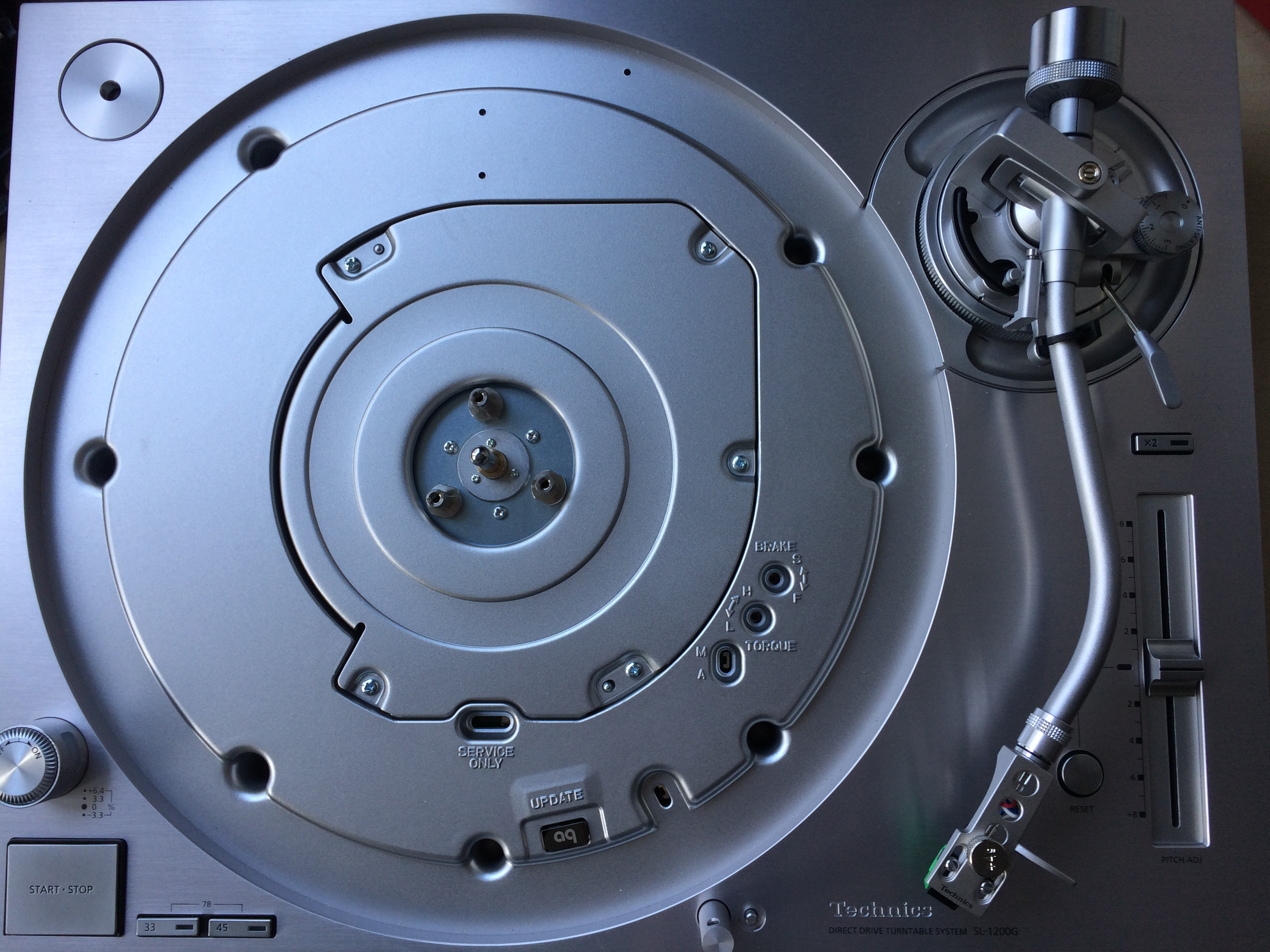
A Technics SL-1200G turntable with the platter removed reveals the top of the newly designed coreless direct drive motor assembly. In contrast to older models, the platter has no magnet ring on the backside, but is bolted directly onto the motor assembly instead, using three flathead bolts.

These models came from the development of a completely rebuilt SL-1200 from the ground up, with the intent to create a new system for hi-fi use and to redefine the direct-drive turntable reference.

==== SL-1200G ====
Announced in January 2016 at CES in Las Vegas and released in October 2016, the SL-1200 Grand Class is an aluminum-bound turntable with a high–damping matte magnesium tonearm, a four–layer turntable cabinet, and a three-layer platter. It is complete with a microprocessor and the use of a newly developed, coreless twin-rotor direct-drive motor, with no iron core, with rotary positioning sensors to eliminate cogging, as well as providing 78 rpm speed compatibility.

==== SL-1200GAE ====
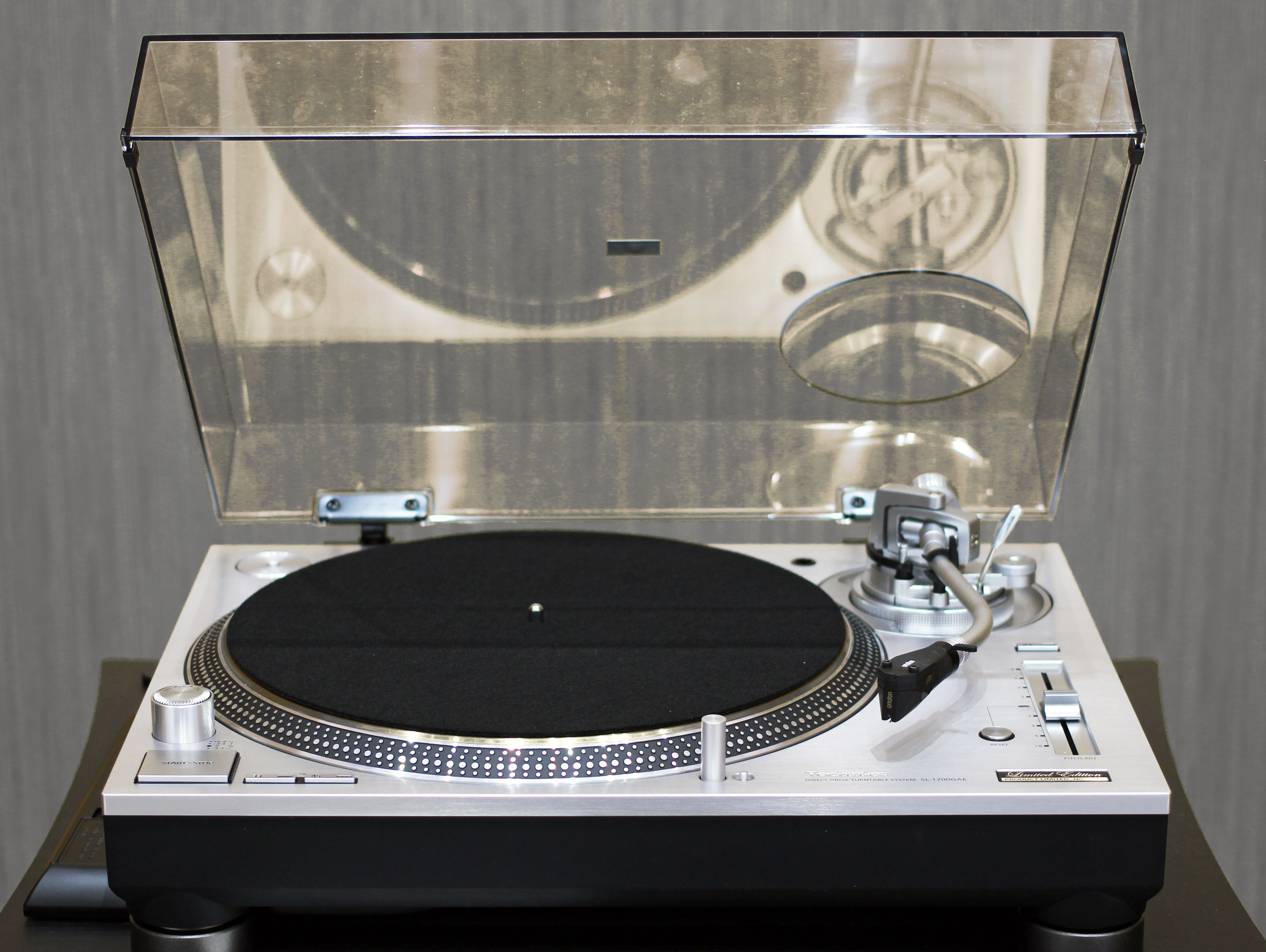
An SL-1200GAE (2016) with an Ortofon pickup instead of the original

Announced in January 2016 at CES in Las Vegas and released in April 2016, the SL-1200 Grand Class 50th Anniversary Edition was a limited edition of 1,200 units. It is the same as the SL-1200G (see above), but has a high polish tonearm tube finish and a different viscous material in the turntable feet. Both the G and GAE had an approximate MSRP of £3,100 / €3,499 / $4,000.

==== SL-1210GAE ====
On 28 May 2020, Technics hosted an online launch event to reveal the SL-1210GAE as an alternative for the cancelled High End Munich 2020 event, at which they initially planned to reveal it. It is their limited-edition 55th Anniversary Edition turntable, with only 1,210 produced. Each unit has a plaque on it with its production number engraved on it. The SL-1210GAE is the black counterpart of the SL-1200GAE and is the same in every aspect except the color and the additional feature to turn off the strobe light. It had an approximate MSRP of €4,499 (approximately US$4,940).

==== SL-1200GR ====
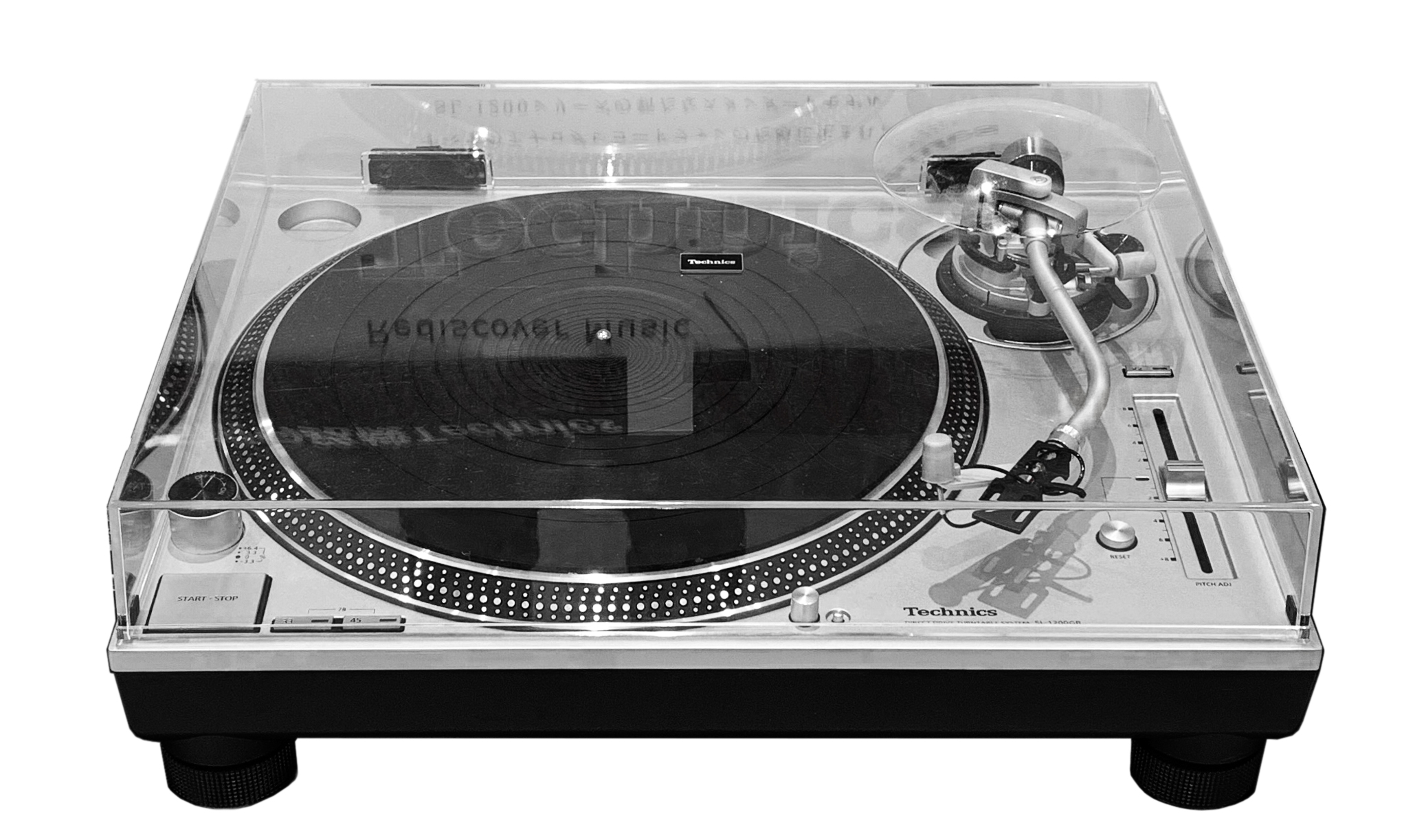
SL-1200GR model from 2019 (on display, without magnetic cartridge)

Announced in January 2017 at CES, the GR model is a stripped-down budget version of the G, cutting the price tag more than half at an approximate MSRP of £1,299 / US$1,700. It differs in body construction in that it uses a more traditional cast aluminum design similar to the older decks and a one-piece cast platter, which brings an overall weight difference between the G/GAE. The G/GAE and GR both use what is essentially the same 9-pole motor. Whereas the G has twin rotors, the GR has a single rotor, giving it less torque. The GR differs from the G in its use of a feedback generator coil system (as used in the original SL1200) instead of an optical encoder.

In 2021 Technics released the SL1200/SL1210 GR2 model, featuring a number of improvements including the new ΔΣ-Drive Delta Sigma Drive. A new motor-drive system that combines PWM signal processing with noise cancellation, resulting in smoother motor rotation and reduced micro-vibrations.

The start stop, 33 rpm and 45 rpm buttons were changed from traditional silver to all-black on the SL1210GR2, and the black accents on the SL1200GR were removed in favour of all-silver accents on the SL1200GR2.

The GR2 now includes the same logo printed head shell as is shipped with the SL1200/1210 MK7.

=== MK7 models (2019-2023) ===
The MK7 models were launched as the first new Technics standard DJ turntable in approximately nine years. The MK7, along with the Grand Class models, no longer has "QUARTZ" printed on the plinth or dust cover.

== See also ==
- Audio-Technica ATLP-120
