= Technics (brand) =

Panasonic brand for audio equipment

- Native name: テクニクス
- Industry: Electronics
- Founded: 1965; 61 years ago
- Headquarters: Kadoma, Osaka, Japan
- Key people: Akira Toyoshima, president
- Products: Dj sets, headphones, synthesizers, turntables
- Parent: Panasonic
- Website: technics.com

Technics (テクニクス, Tekunikusu) is a Japanese audio brand established by Matsushita Electric (now Panasonic) in 1965. Since 1965, Matsushita has produced a variety of HiFi and other audio products under the brand name, such as turntables, amplifiers, radio receivers, tape recorders, CD players, loudspeakers, and digital pianos. Technics products were available for sale in various countries. The brand was originally conceived as a line of high-end audio equipment to compete against brands such as Nakamichi.

From 2002 onwards products were rebranded as Panasonic except in Japan and CIS countries, where the brand remained in high regard. Panasonic discontinued the brand for most products in October 2010, but it was revived in 2015 with new high-end turntables. The brand is best known for the SL-1200 DJ turntable, an industry standard for decades.

== History ==
Technics was introduced as a brand name for premium loudspeakers marketed domestically by Matsushita in 1965. The name came to wider prominence with the international sales of direct-drive turntables. The first direct-drive turntable was invented by Shuichi Obata, an engineer at Matsushita, based in Osaka. It eliminated belts, and instead employed a motor to directly drive a platter on which a vinyl record rests. It is a significant advancement over older belt-drive turntables, which are unsuitable for turntablism, since they have a slow start-up time, and are prone to wear-and-tear and breakage, as the belt would break from back spinning or scratching. In 1969, Matsushita launched Obata's invention as the SP-10, the first direct-drive turntable on the professional market.

In 1971, Matsushita released the Technics SL-1100 for the consumer market. Due to its strong motor, durability, and fidelity, it was adopted by early hip hop artists. The SL-1100 was used by the influential DJ Kool Herc for the first sound system he set up after emigrating from Jamaica to the US.

It was followed by the SL-1200, the most influential turntable. It was developed in 1971 by a team led by Shuichi Obata at Matsushita, which then released it onto the market in 1972. It was adopted by New York City hip hop DJs such as Grand Wizard Theodore and Afrika Bambaataa in the 1970s. As they experimented with the SL-1200 decks, they developed scratching techniques when they found that the motor would continue to spin at the correct RPM even if the DJ wiggled the record back and forth on the platter.

As the upgraded SL-1200 MK2, it became a widely used turntable by DJs. A robust machine, the SL-1200 MK2 incorporated a pitch control mechanism (or vari-speed), and maintained a relatively constant speed with low variability, which proved popular with DJs. The SL-1200 series remained the most widely used turntable in DJ culture through to the 2000s. The SL-1200 model, often considered the industry standard turntable, continued to evolve with the M3D series, followed by the MK5 series in 2003.

Despite being originally created to market their high-end equipment, by the early 1980s Technics was offering an entire range of equipment from entry-level to high-end.

In 1972, Technics introduced the first autoreverse system in a cassette deck in its Technics RS-277US and in 1973 it introduced the first three-head recording technique in a cassette deck (Technics RS-279US).

In 1976, Technics introduced two belt-driven turntables for the mass market, the SL-20 and SL-23. The principal difference between the two models was the additional feature of semi-automatic operation in the SL-23, along with an adjustable speed control with built-in strobe light. They offered technical specifications and features rivaling much more expensive turntables, including well-engineered s-shaped tonearms with tracking weight and anti-skate adjustments. At the time they were introduced, the SL-20 and SL-23, which sold for $US100 and $US140 respectively, set a new performance standard for inexpensive turntables.

The Technics brand was discontinued in 2010, but reappeared at the 2014 consumer electronics trade fair IFA. In January 2016 on the occasion of the 50th Anniversary the Technics SL-1200 returned with the Technics SL-1200 G.

== Notable products ==
Technics audio products
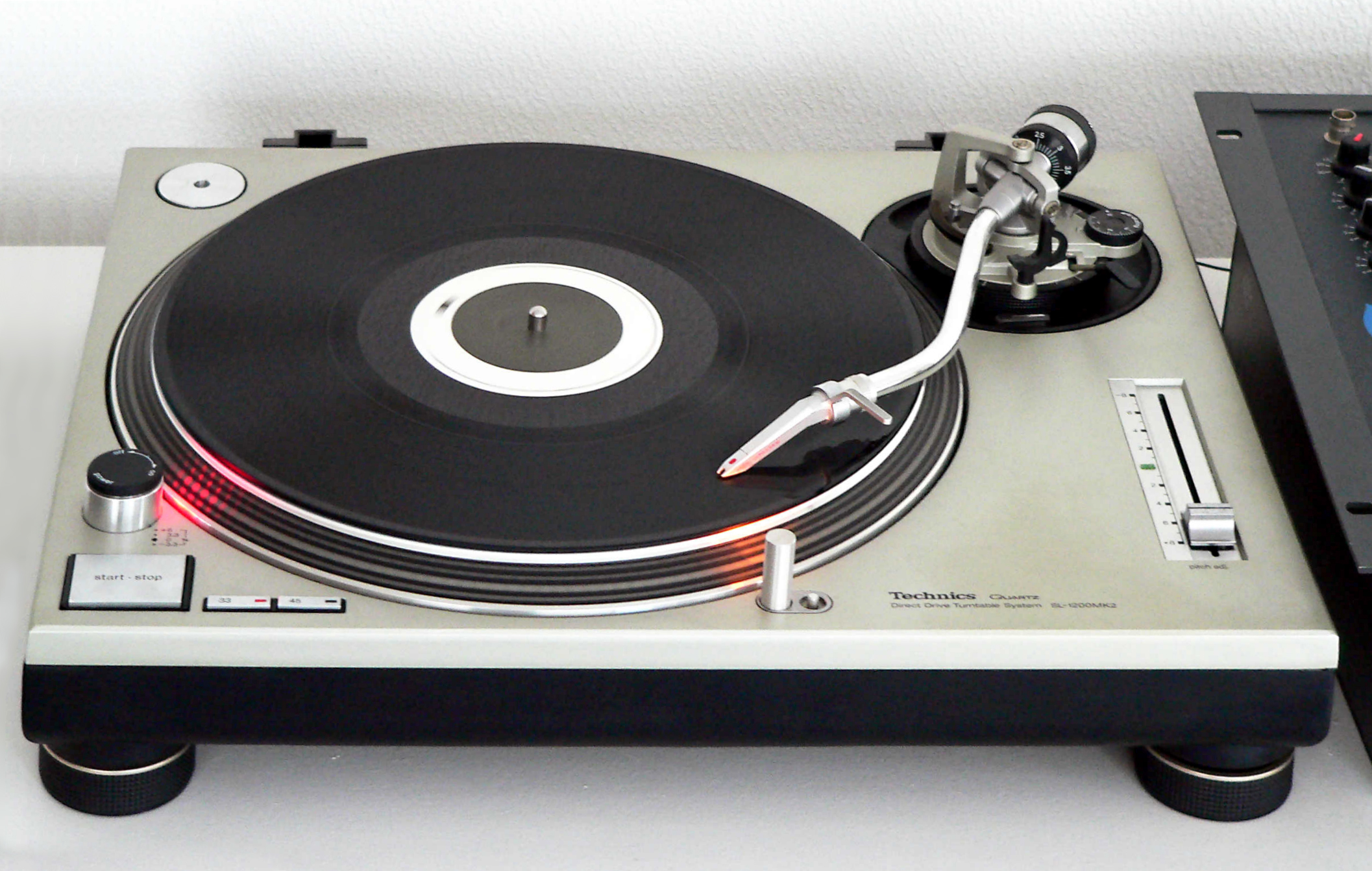
Technics SL-1200 with Directdrive (1972–2010, 2016)

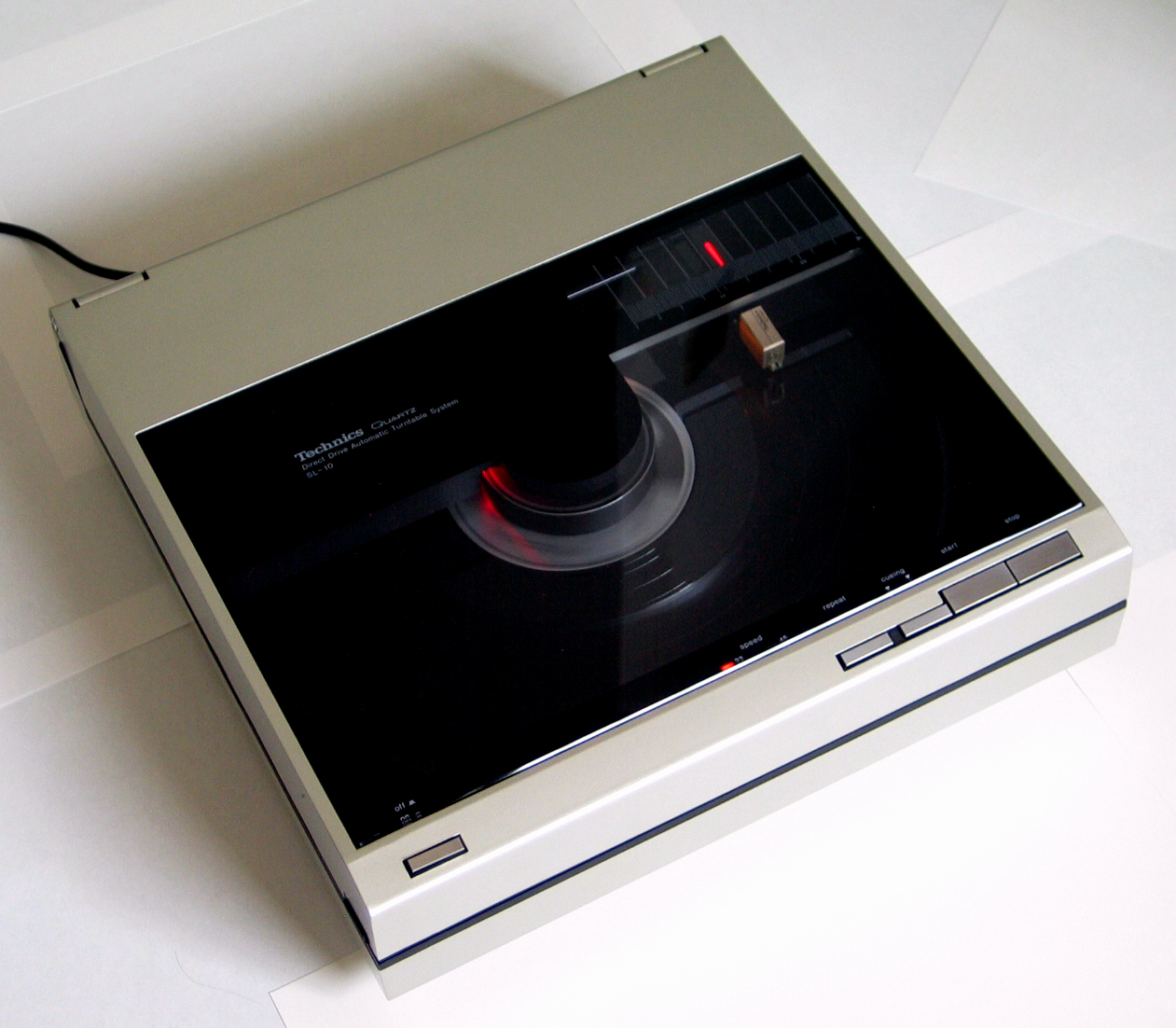
Technics SL-10 with Directdrive and linear-tracking (1980–1984)

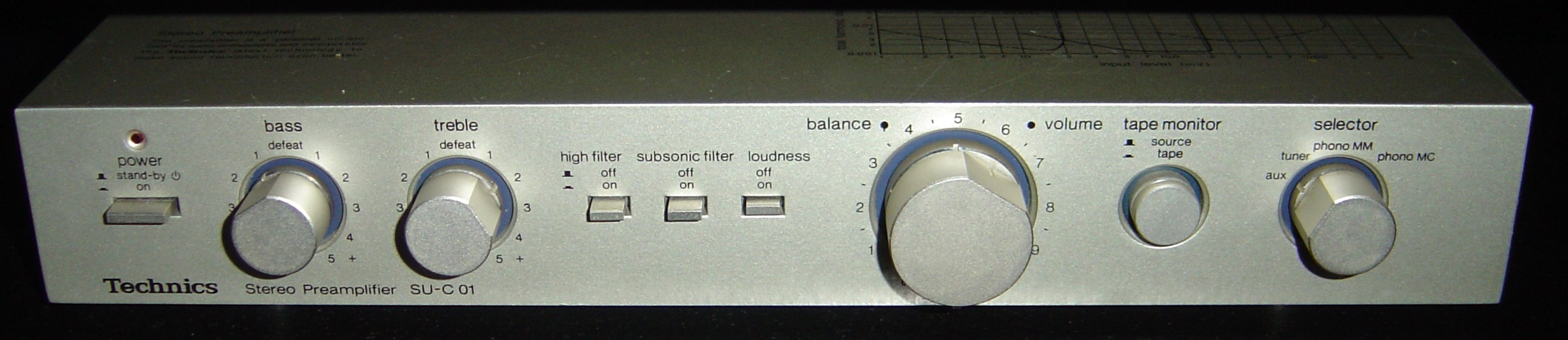
SU-C01 Stereo Preamplifier (1979)

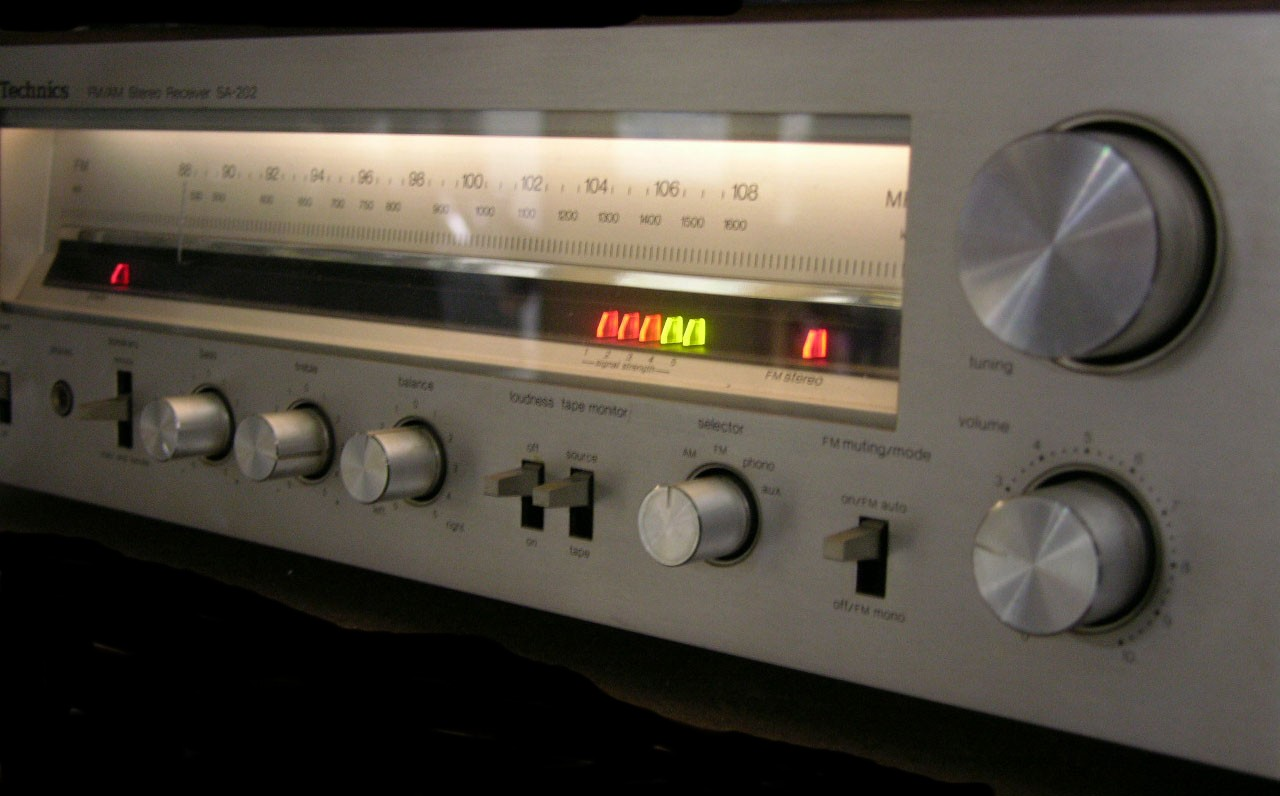
SA-202, typical Receiver (c. 1980)

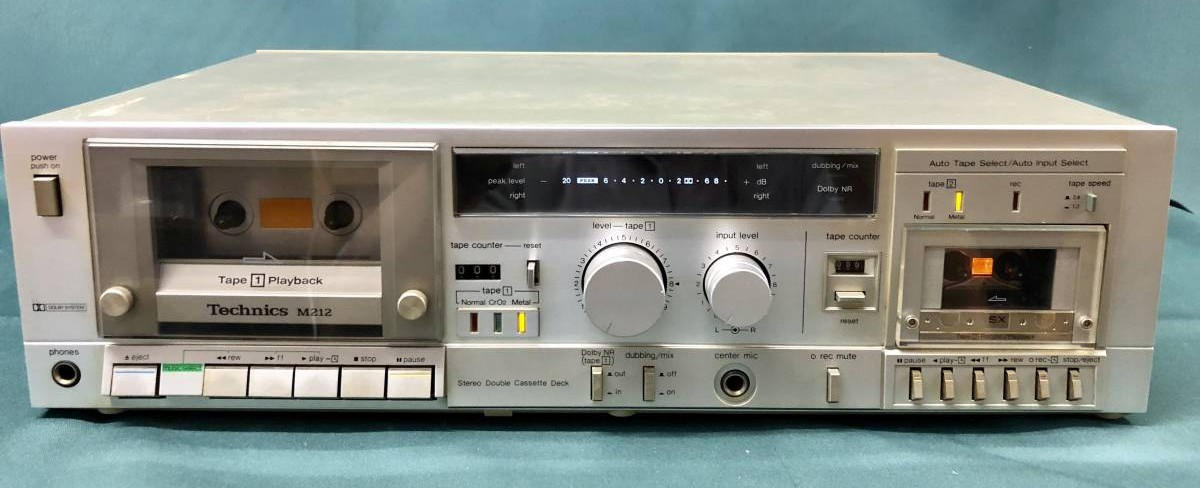
Technics RS-M212 dual cassette deck for both Compact Cassette and Microcassette (1981)

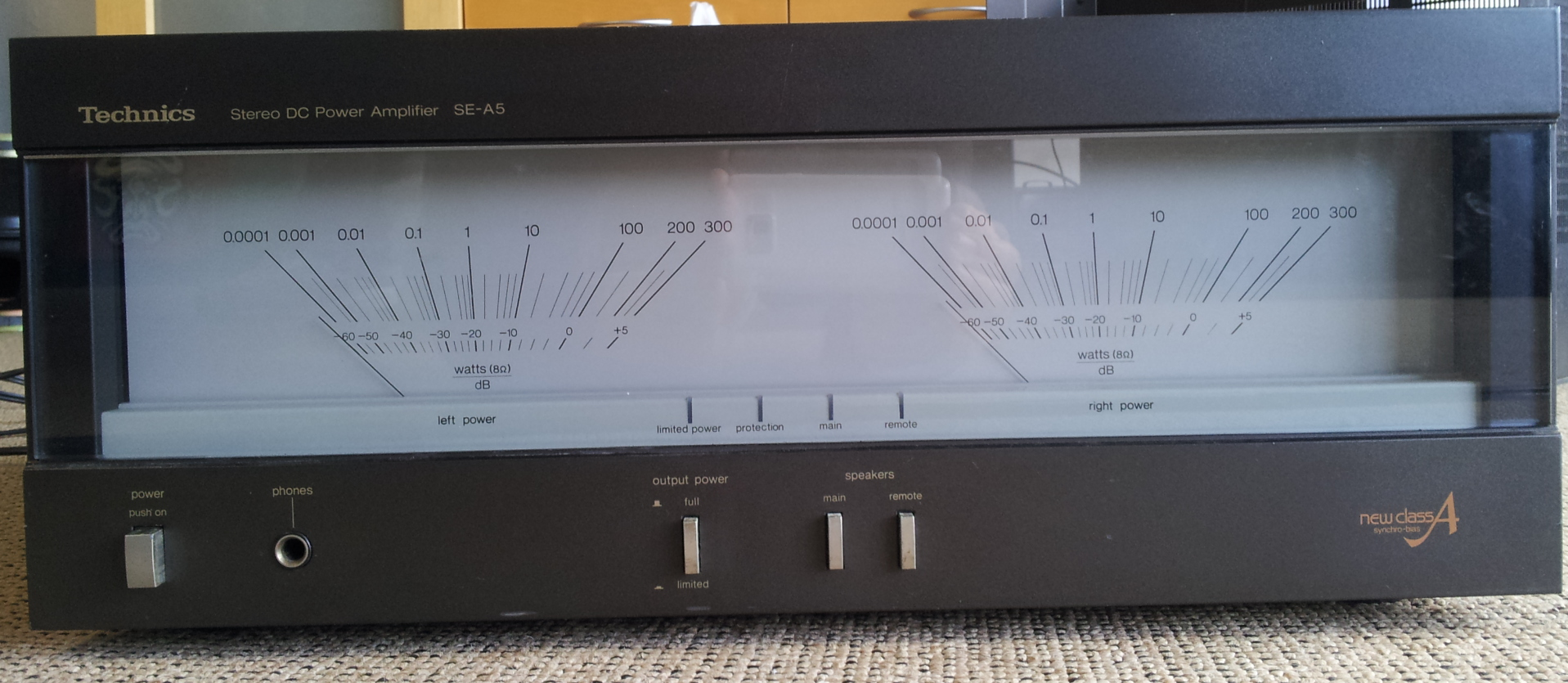
SE-A 5 Power amplifier (c. 1982)

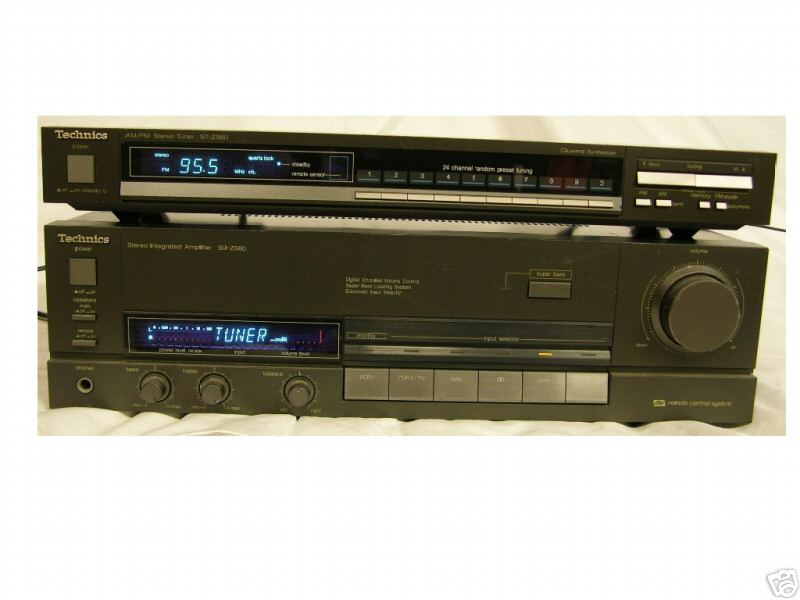
SU-Z980 120 W Stereo Amplifier and ST-Z980 AM/FM Tuner (mid 1980s)

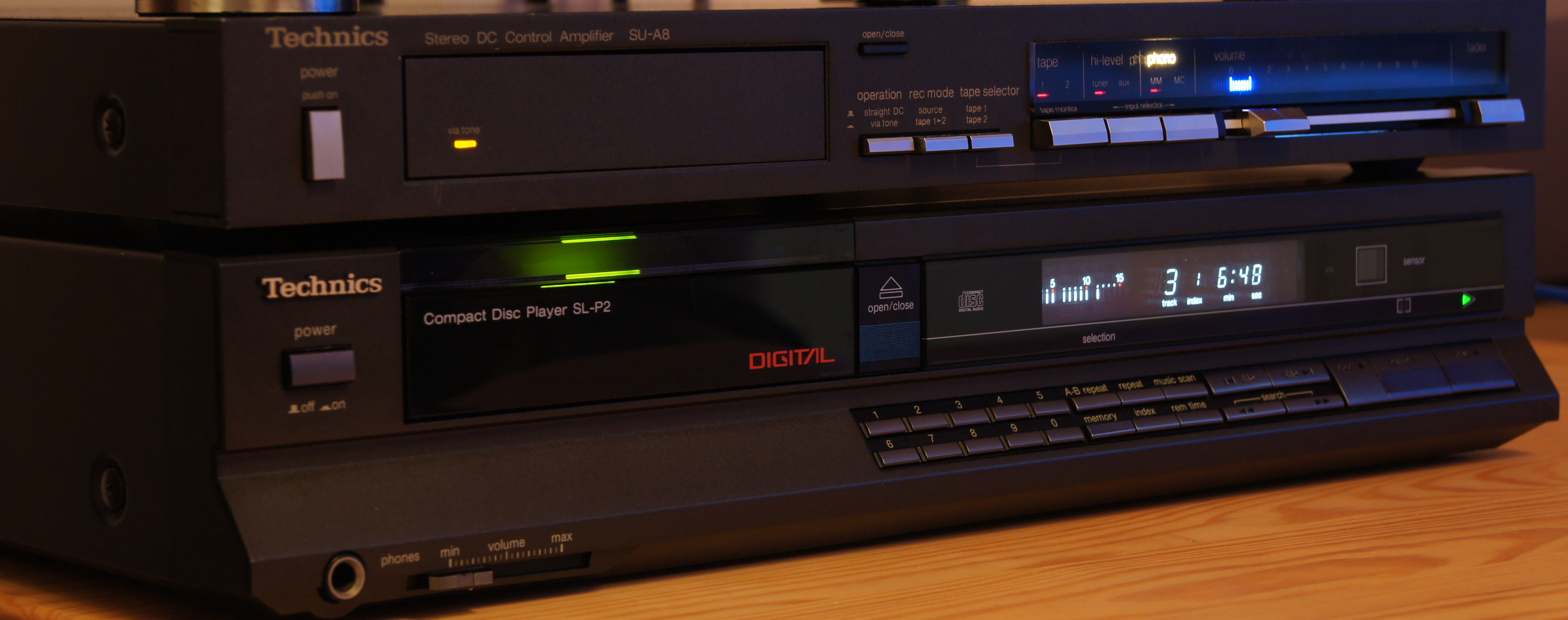
Technics CD-player SL-P2 and
Preamplifier SU-A8 (c. 1985)

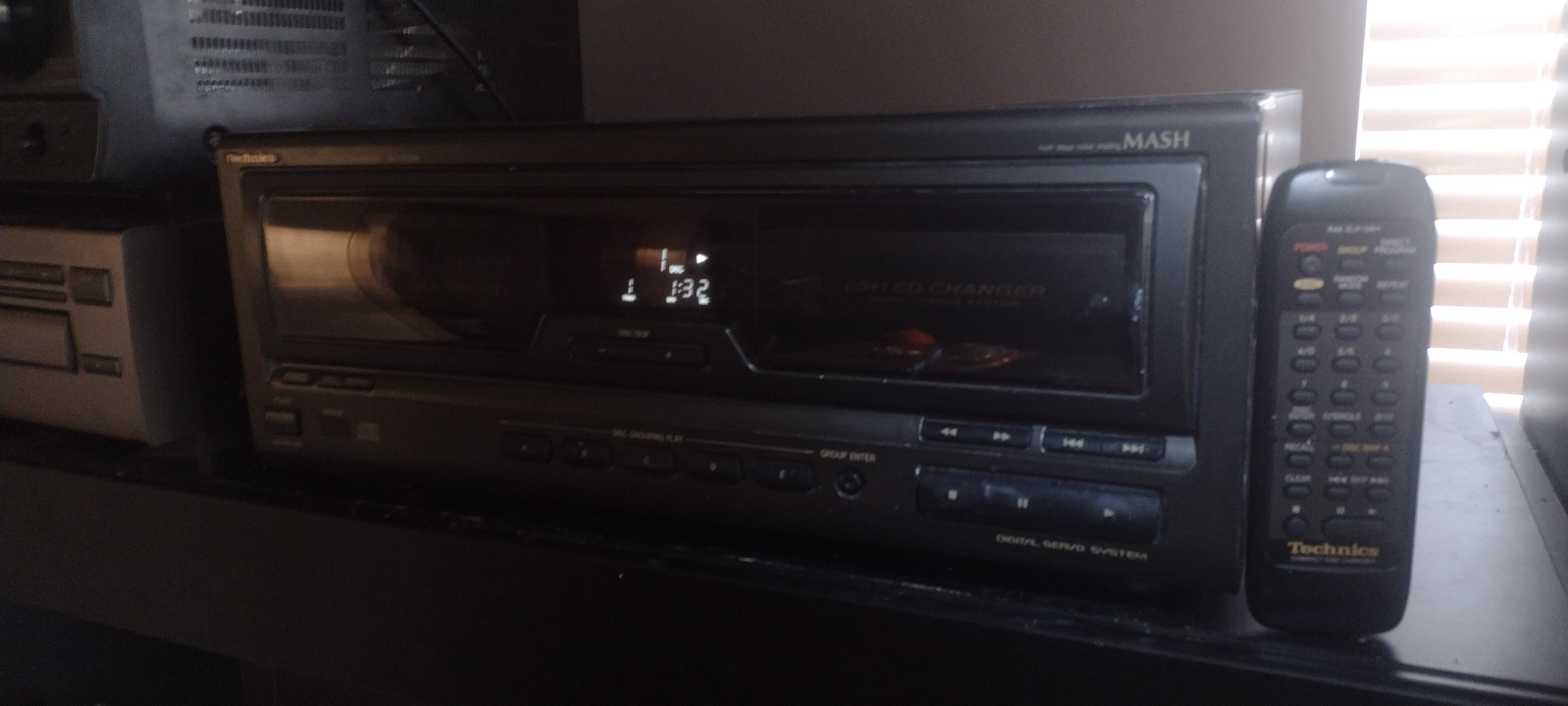
Technics 60+1 cd changer SL-MC59 (c. 1998)

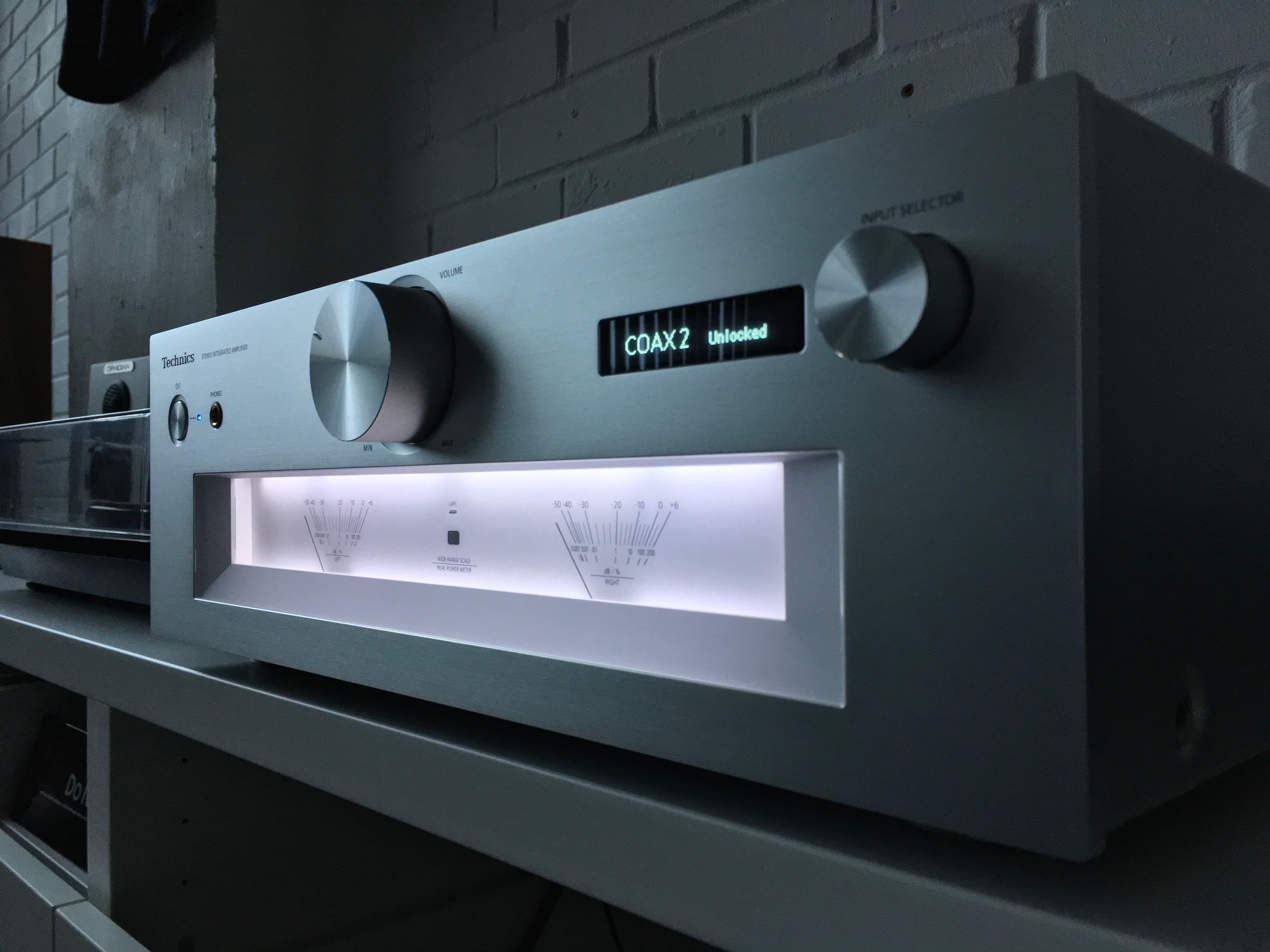
Digital amplifier SU-G700 (c. 2018)

=== Early 1960s ===
- SX-601 Electronic Organ (1963) – an origin of Technics SX keyboard series, the result of cooperative works of National Electronic Organ Company (Panasonic group) and Ace Tone (precursor of Roland Corporation).
  After the 1970s, this product line was branded "Technitone" as a brother brand of Technics, and newer electronic musical instruments were branded Technics.
- EAB-1204 loudspeakers (1965) – premium loudspeakers, later renamed to SB-1204. Nicknamed "Technics 1", and referred to as the origin of Technics brand.

=== Late 1960s – early 1970s ===
- SP-10 Direct Drive Turntables (1969) – first direct-drive model for the professional market
- SL-1100 Direct Drive Turntables (1971) – for the consumer market
- SL-1200 Direct Drive Turntables (1972) – for the consumer market
- RS-277US Autoreverse Cassette Deck (1972)
- RS-279US Three-heads recording Cassette Deck (1973)
- SA-6800X 4 Channel Receiver (1973) – also branded a Panasonic and National Panasonic. Each had different front panel styling

=== Mid-1970s ===
- SA-8500X The biggest quadraphonic receiver Technics ever built with integrated CD4 demodulation
- RS-858US quadraphonic 8-track player/recorder
- SH-3433 4-channel Quadraphonic Audioscope
- SA-50XX Budget amplifiers ranging from $150 (cheapest) to $600 (Most expensive)
- SB-7000 Linear Phase 3 way loudspeaker (First Linear Phase Speaker system in the World)
- SL-20 and SL-23 belt drive turntables. Their first belt drive series. Wooden (MDF) plinth. Intended as a cheaper alternative to their higher end direct drive. Main difference is that SL-20 is completely manual without any automatic function or pitch control. SL-23 is basically built on the same base, but has an auto return function, independent pitch control for 33 and 45 speeds and stroboscope for 50 and 60 Hz. Also known as SL-22 respectively SL-26 in some markets.

=== Late 1970s ===
- RS-1500/1700 series of open-reel tape decks;
- SA-100/400/600/800/1000 receivers
- SL-1300, SL-1400, SL-1500, SL-1600, SL-1700, SL-1800 Direct Drive Turntables
- SL-1300MK2, SL-1400MK2, SL-1500MK2, SL-150MK2 (No Tonearm) Quartz Synthesizer Direct Drive Turntables "Professional Series"
- "New class A" Amplifier series launched featuring inter alia SE-A3/SE-A5 High Output Power Amplifiers
- SU-C01, SU-C03, SU-C04 amplifiers (a "concise" line of home audio consisting of amplifier, tuner and cassette deck)
- SB-F1, SB-F01, SB-F2 and SB-F3 monitor speakers (2-way, sealed casing, aluminium box speakers)
- SY-1010 Analog Synthesizer (1977)
- 9000 Professional Series: A series of stack-able, or rack mountable, units included the SE-9060 Amp, SU-9070 Pre-Amp, SH-9010 Equalizer, SH-9020 Meter Unit and ST-9030 Tuner. These "Pro Series" components replaced the earlier SE-9600 Amp, SU-9700 Pre-Amp and ST-9300/9600/9700 Tuner that were deemed too large. The 9000 Pro Series was introduced because of demand for smaller, quality components. The European version of the Pro Series had a different faceplate than the US version: 18" vs. 19". Because of the narrower face plate, the European version required special rack brackets to be rack mountable. The brackets came with the European version of the SH-905ST Professional Series rack. The only difference between this rack and the US version was inclusion of those brackets. As a result, the brackets are ultra rare and even the rack was sold in limited numbers in the USA.
- SB-10000 Loudspeaker: Top of the line Technics speaker at a cost of US$12,000. They featured a tweeter made of boron. A used pair sold for US$32,050 around 2010 in Germany.
- SE-A1 Amp: Top of the line Technics amp at a cost of US$6,000.
- SU-A2 Pre-Amp: Top of the line for Technics at a cost of US$8,000.
- SB-E100 and SB-E200 Loudspeakers: These were both designed with the SB-10000 in mind. The SB-E100 looked like the 10000 with the bass enclosure turned on its end with the mid/tweeter section mounted on top. The SB-E100 was made of MDF with Rosewood veneer. The SB-E200 was made of Rosewood and, while more similar in design to the SB-10000, it was virtually the same as the SB-E100 except for the bass box configuration and solid wood. The SB-E100 was designed to sit on the floor while the SB-E200 could sit on a table or pedestal. The SB-E100 had slightly better specs than the SB-E200 due to construction. Neither of them were released for the US market.
- RS-9900US Tape Deck: Top-of-the-line tape deck at the time and quite at home with the 9600 Series components listed above. It was a two-piece behemoth that sold for $2,000 in 1977–78.
- RS-M95 Tape Deck: This deck replaced the 9600 in the same way as the 9000 Professional Series components replaced the 9600. It was much smaller, less expensive ($1400) and had better specs than the RS-9900US it replaced, resulting in better sound.

=== Early 1980s ===
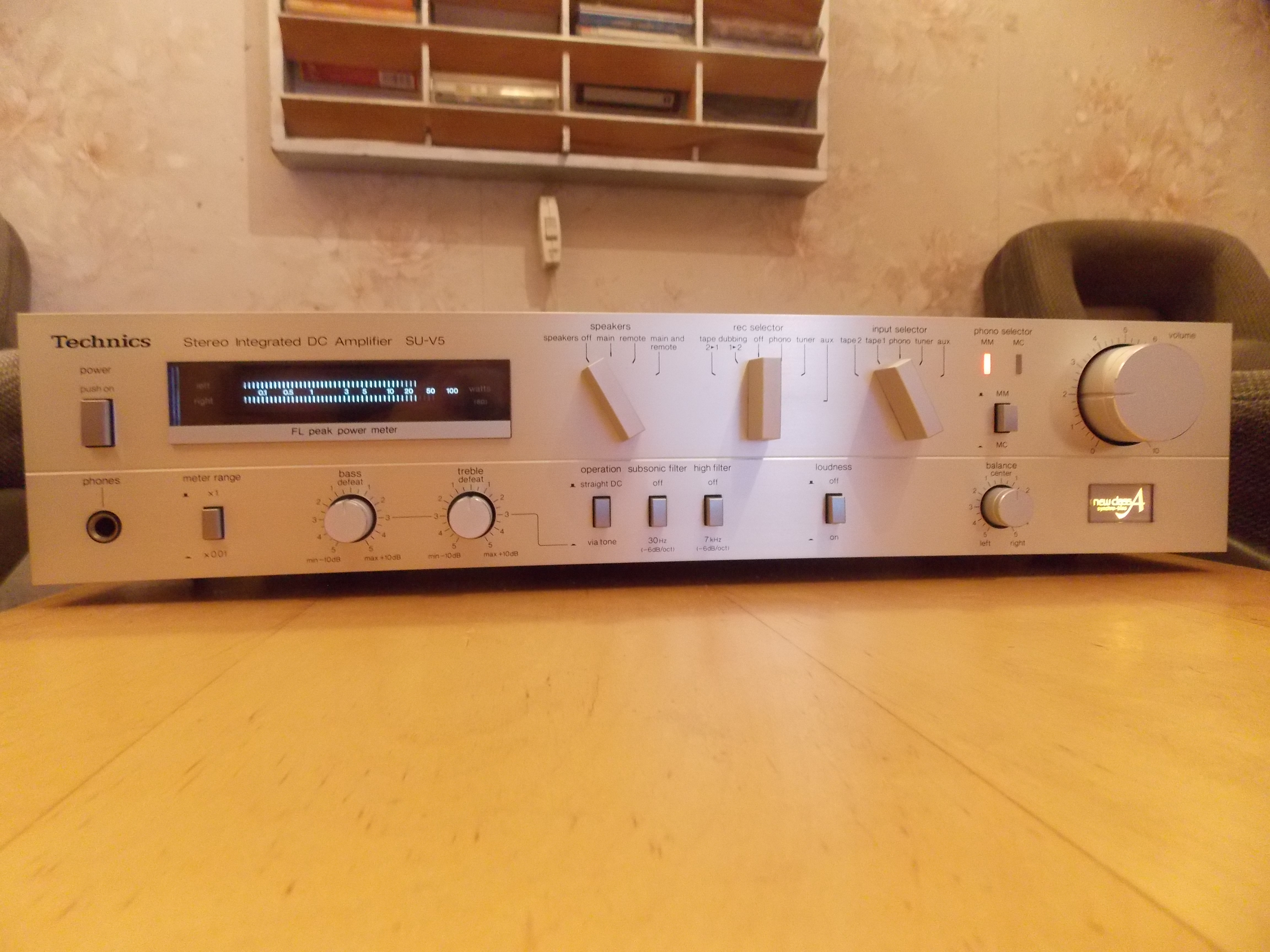
1980s Technics SU-V5 stereo amplifier

- SU-V3, V4, V5, V6, V7, V8 and V9 "new Class A" Stereo Integrated Amplifiers
- SE-A3MK2, SE-A5, SE-A5MK2, SE-A7 Power Amplifiers and SU-A4MK2, SU-A6 SU-A6MK2 and SU-A8 preamplifiers
- SV-P100 digital audio recorder (using VHS tapes). Also available as the SV-100, a stand-alone PCM adaptor requiring a separate VCR;
- cassette decks with dbx noise reduction
- SB-2155 3-Way Stereo Speakers [1982]
- SL-D212 Direct Drive Turntable [1982]
- SU-Z65 Stereo Integrated Amplifier [1982]
- SH-8015 Stereo Frequency Equalizer [1982]
- ST-Z45 Synthesizer FM/AM Stereo Tuner [1981]
- RS-M205 Cassette Deck [1980]
- RS-M216 Cassette Deck [1982]
- direct-drive linear tracking turntables SL-10, SL-15, SL-7, SL-6, SL-5, and SL-V5 (vertical)

=== Mid-1980s ===
- Technitone E series (1983): one of the earliest PCM sampling organs in Japan
- SX-PV10 PCM Digital Piano (1984): one of the earliest PCM sampling pianos in Japan
- SL-J2: direct-drive turntable
- SY-DP50 PCM Digital Drum Percussion (1985)
- "Class AA" VC-4 stereo integrated amplifiers, starting with the SU-V40, V50 and V60 models (1986)
- The SL range of Direct Drive turntables, like the SL-5

=== 1990s–2000s ===
During the '90s, Technics launched a successful series of mini hi-fi systems (SC-EH series, SC-CA SC-CH series and SC-DV series with cd player and surround sound) and in the late 90s, the very successful series of mini hi-fi systems, SC-HD series (SC-HDV and SC-HDA, for series with DVD player and surround sound).

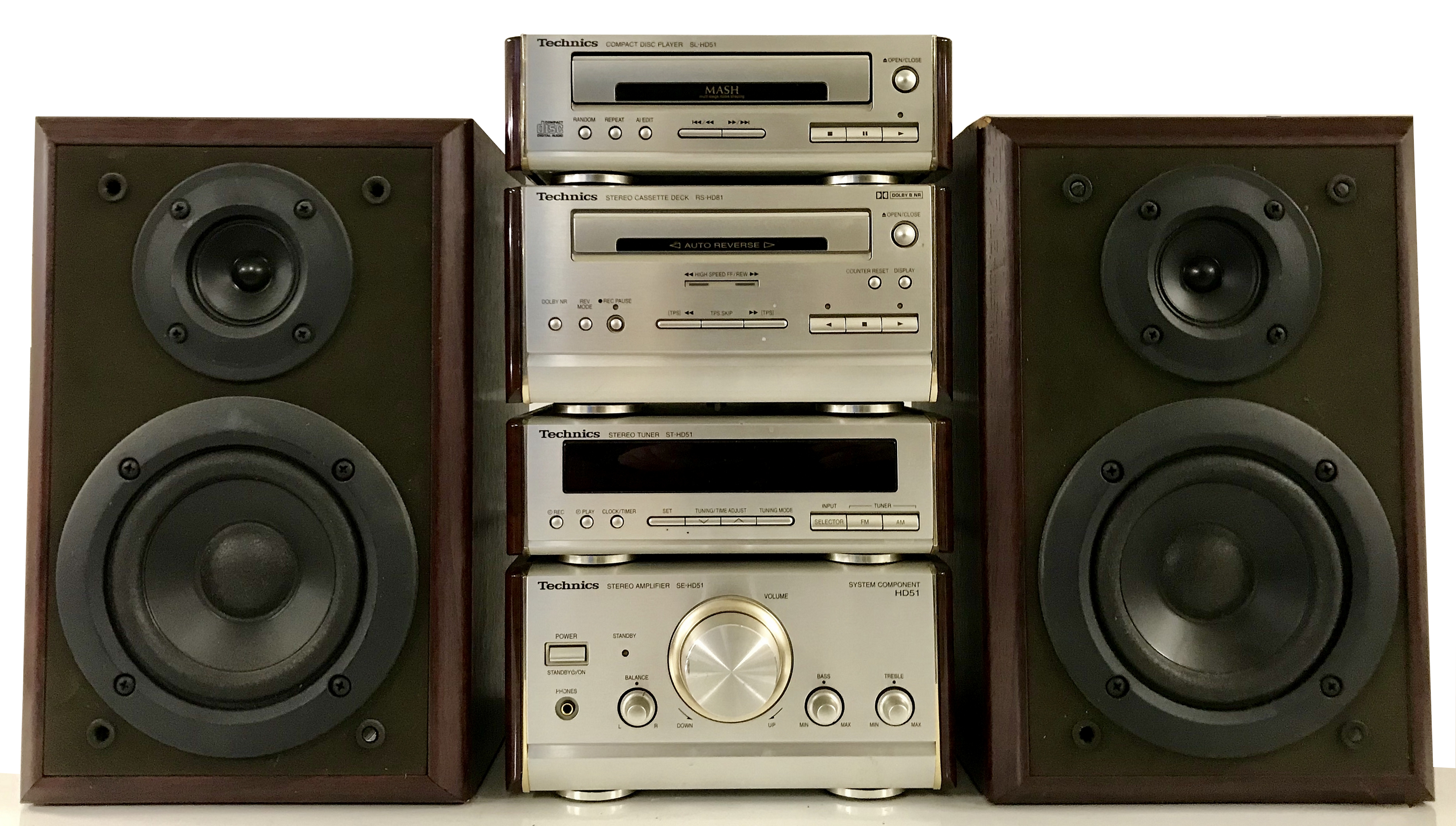
Technics SC-HD51 mini hi-fi system.

These were manufactured until 2004, and after that, until 2005, were named Panasonic for the short time they were still kept in production after the Technics brand was phased out. Technics had also created a 60+1 disc changer in 1998 under the model line SL-MC (excluding the last model, the SL-MC7, that being a 110+1 changer) that ran until 2002 across a total of 8 models before being shut down, the last 60+1 mechanisms being featured in Panasonic Mini-HiFi systems. The Technics badge was then relegated to turntables in 2005, including the low cost SL-BD20/22 manufactured well into the 2000s, and some higher quality headphones and speakers, although the same model names appeared under both Technics and Panasonic names in some countries, for a while. From 2002 onwards, receivers which once were known as Technics, were rebranded as Panasonic. Technics stopped manufacturing separates (cd players, cassette deck, tuners, amplifiers) in late 2001, but remained for a while in the home cinema market, with both DVD players and receivers and speakers until late 2002, when these were renamed Panasonic. From 2004 on, except turntables, a series of headphones, and some DJ equipment, all audio products were by now bearing the Panasonic name, rather than Technics. Also, by 2004, both SL-BD20/22 turntables were phased out. The two subwoofers listed below (SST-25/35HZ) along with the SST-1 loudspeakers, were not intended for home use.

- SST-25HZ Super Bass Exciter (Sub-Woofer), top of the line Technics sub
- SST-35HZ Super Bass Exciter (Sub-woofer), 1991 cost $2500
- SST-1 Loudspeaker, 1991 cost $2000. These were meant to be mated with the SST-25HZ or 35HZ sub-woofers.
- hi-quality power amps, Mainstream receivers, Dolby Pro Logic receivers
- SX-KN series electronic keyboards, including the arranger keyboards KN3000, KN5000, KN6000 and KN7000, competing with the same market as the Yamaha Tyros
- SX-WSA1/SX-WSA1R Digital Synthesizer (1995), using Acoustic Modeling synthesis (PCM sample + physical modeling resonator)
Technics musical instruments
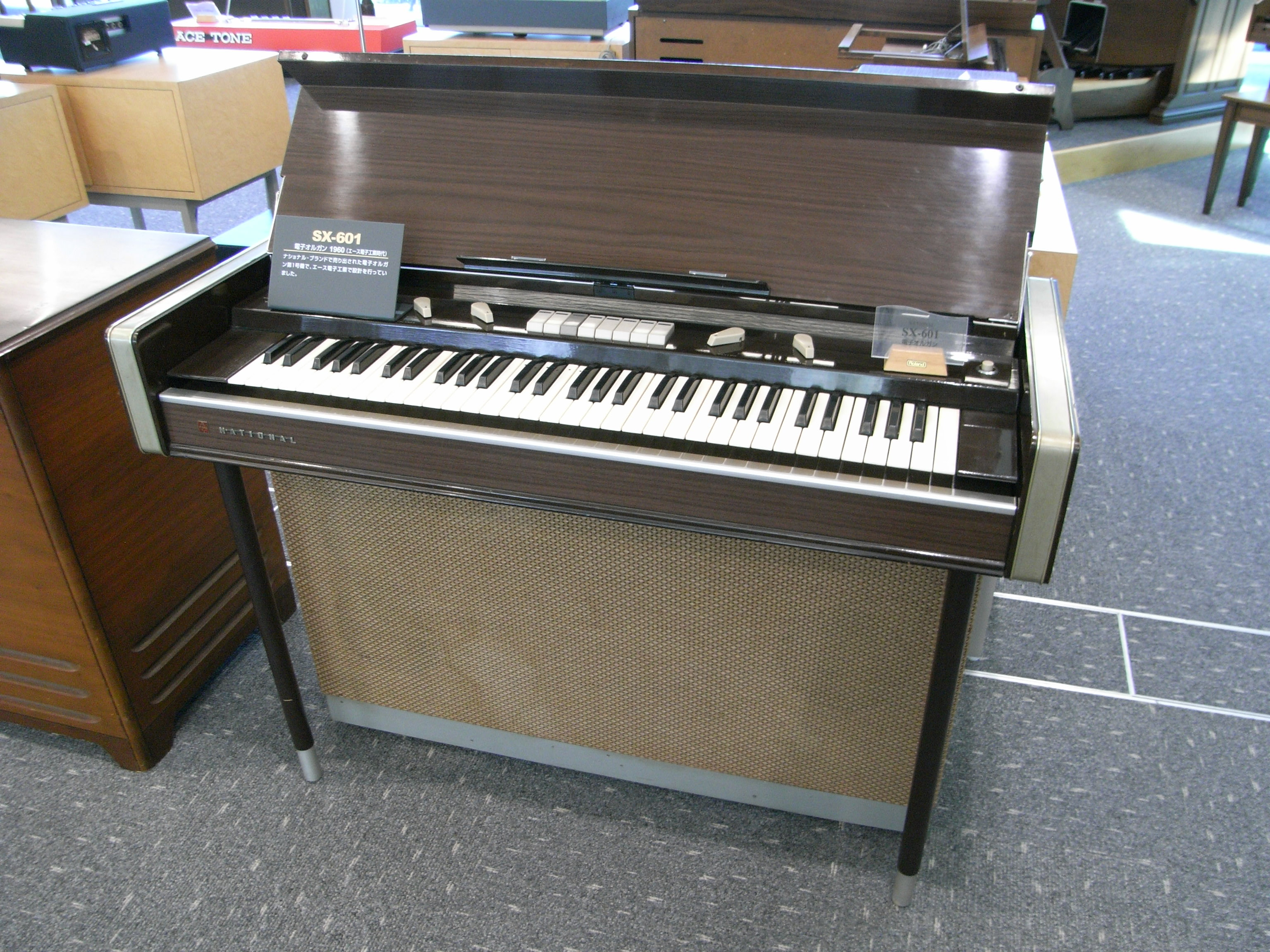
National SX-601 Electronic Organ (1963)

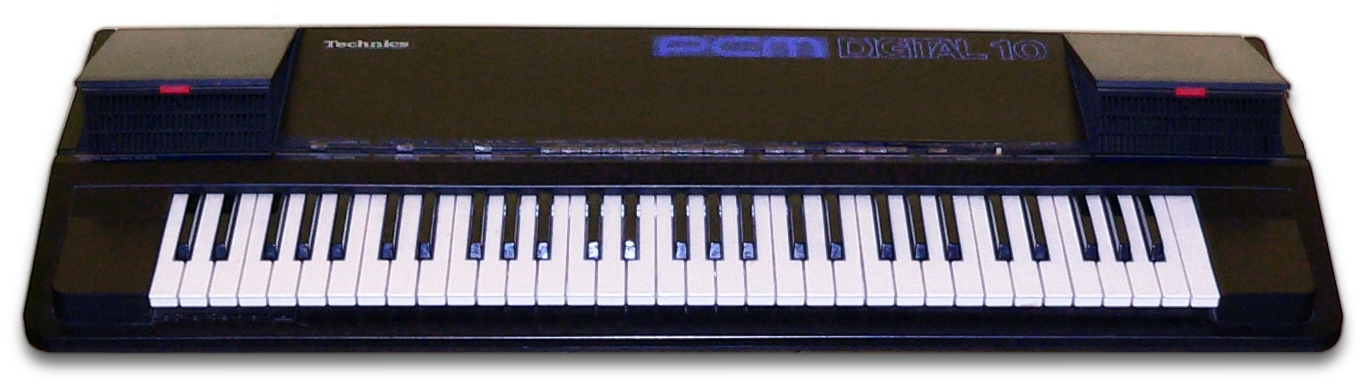
SX-PV10 PCM Digital Piano (1984)

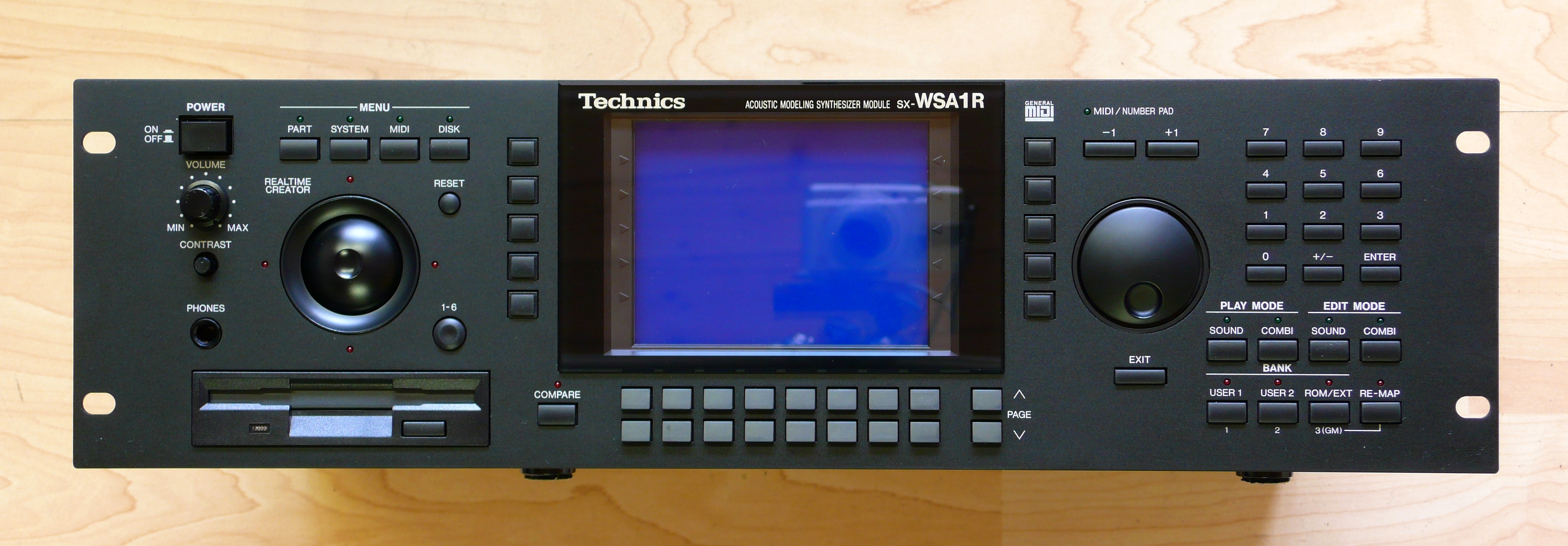
SX-WSA1R Digital Synthesizer (1995)

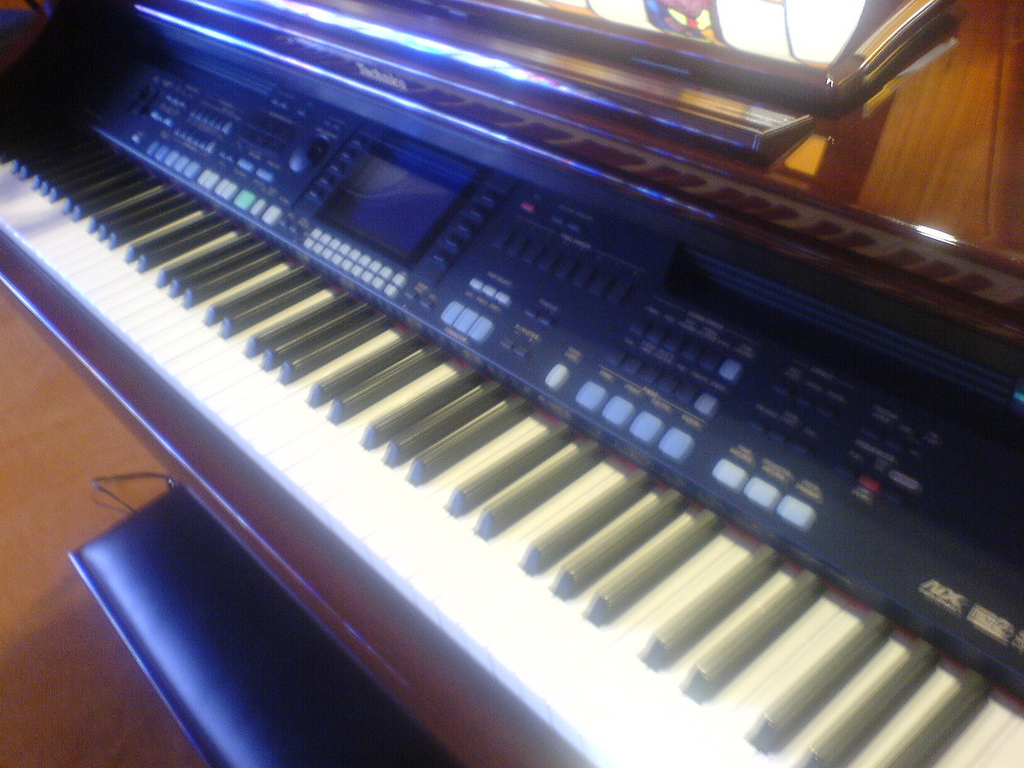
SX-PR902 Digital Ensemble Piano (c. 1998)

=== Since 2014 ===
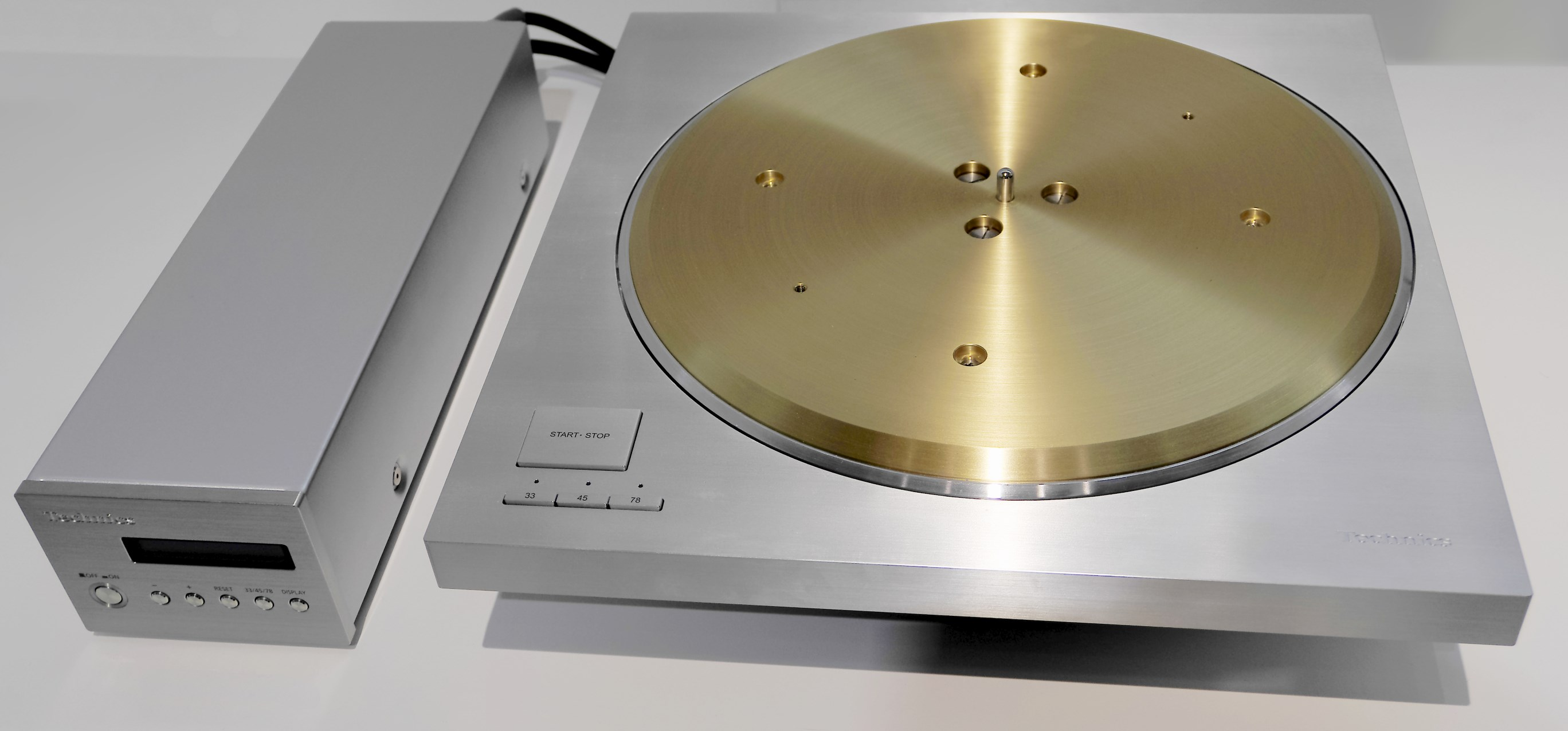
Developed version of the professional turntable SP-10 (1969) for Vinyl, Technics SP-10R (2018)

Panasonic Corporation relaunched the Technics brand in late 2014, mainly because of increased market interest in high end hi-fi, and also due to renewed interest in vinyl. The brand was relaunched with a series of amplifiers, speakers and micro hi-fi systems, but no turntables were yet available. The turntables were relaunched in 2016.

As written above, in 2016, on the occasion of the 50th Anniversary of the SL-1200, Technics came back with the SL-1200 G. About 2017 a remarkable digital amplifier, the SU-G700, was announced. Among their most successful products are the newly launched SL1500-C turntable series, and the Ottava micro hi-fi series, and also their active speakers series. The SL1200 is also successful. Technics SL1500-C was launched as an alternative to the SL1200 series, being aimed at home use rather than DJ use. It has a quartz speed stabilizer, also it has no variable pitch and has no stroboscope for speed adjustment. Like 1200, it is manual; it only has an arm lift feature at the end of the record, which can be deactivated. It is available in silver and black versions. It has a built-in preamplifier, which can be completely deactivated if not needed. It also has a heavy damped platter. In the tradition of Technics, SL1500-C is a Direct Drive turntable. It is different, however, from the SL1500 models from the 1970s and it is not manufactured in Japan like its bigger brothers, the SL1200 and the SP10, but in Malaysia. In 2021 the production of all Technics turntables was moved to Malaysia. Although Technics previously manufactured a series of belt drive turntables (mainly cheaper versions), no new belt drive turntables from Technics are available now, and it seems that Technics will not launch a new belt drive series.

Technics also launched a successful series of wireless headphones, both earbuds and over the ear types. As of 2022, the earbuds series are: EAH-AZ40, EAH-AZ60, EAH-AZ70, EAH-AZ80 and EAH-AZ100. The over the ear series are EAH-A800 and EAH-F70. All of them, except from EAH-F70, can be controlled with an application from Technics. All of them have noise canceling. EAH-F70 seems to be discontinued, although still available. The EAH-F70 and EAH-A800 models can also operate as wired headphones, in which case the microphone and active noise canceling features are lost.

In 2024, they released their first fully wireless/BT Bookshelf system the SC-CX700-T.

== See also ==
- List of phonograph manufacturers
