= Technics SL-10 =

Direct-drive, linear tracking automatic turntable

The Technics SL-10 is a direct-drive, linear tracking automatic turntable, which was produced from 1979 to 1985.

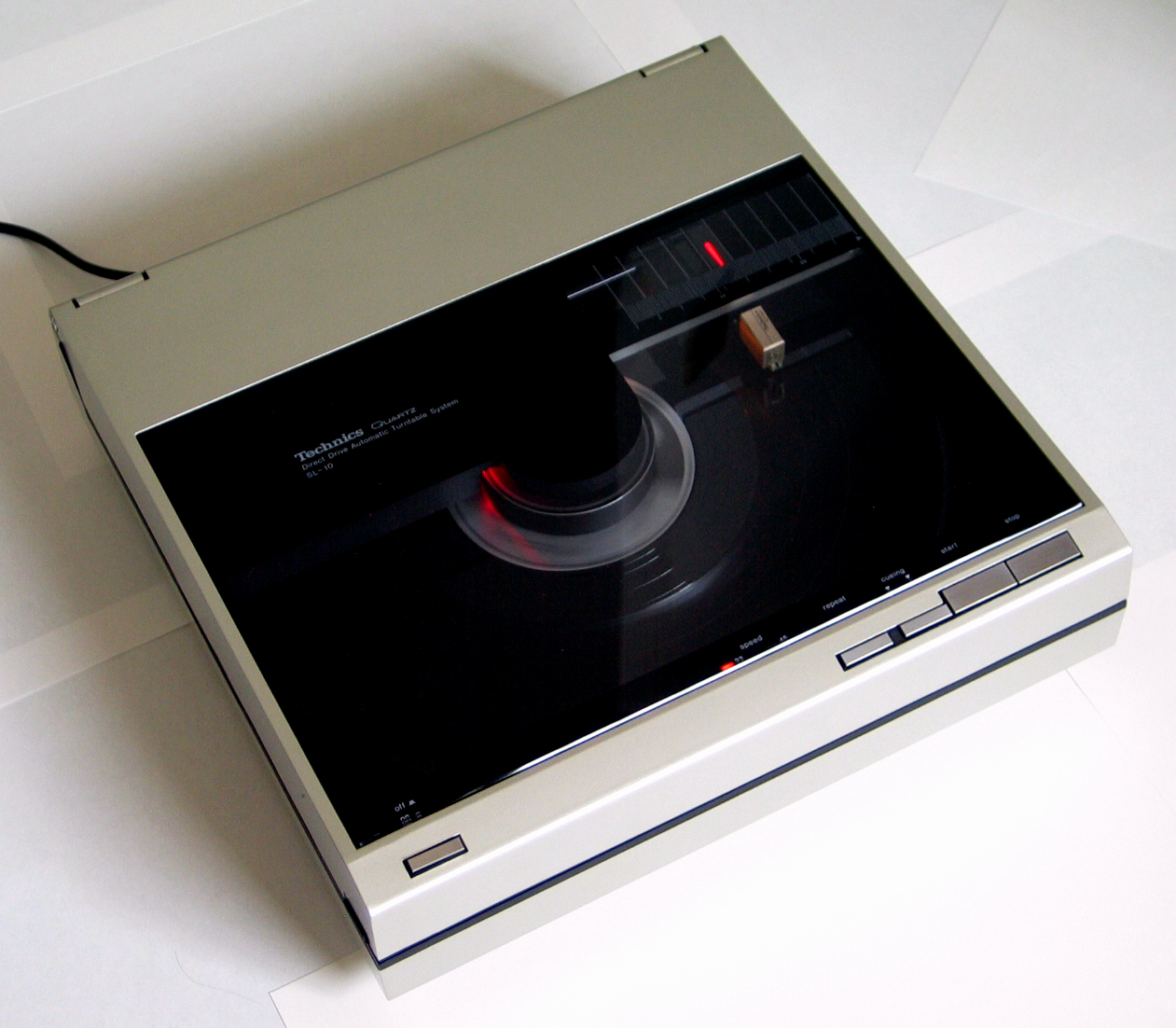
Technics SL-10

== Features ==
The SL-10 was the first linear-tracking turntable to feature direct drive, a Technics innovation dating back to 1969 with the SP-10 Mk I. The SL-10, along with its fully programmable stablemate the SL-15, was able to penetrate the consumer electronics market much more effectively than any preceding linear-tracking turntable, and it spawned a wave of imitators throughout the 1980s, along with many derivations by Technics itself.

Unlike many of the inexpensive designs that followed it, the SL-10 is cast from aluminum and weighs 6.5 kg (14 lb). Its chassis is the same size as a standard LP jacket, doing away with the large plinth, visible tonearm and general bulk associated with conventional radial-tracking turntables that the public was familiar with up to that point.

The SL-10 came equipped with the Technics EPS-310MC moving-coil cartridge. Due to the low output of the moving-coil cartridge, the SL-10 includes a built-in, bypassable step-up preamp to allow it to connect to standard phono inputs. The original Technics EPS-310MC moving-coil cartridge was designed to be replaced as a unit; the stylus was not removable. The cartridge has since been discontinued; the SL-10 will accept any P-mount/T4P cartridge. The SL-10 is capable of being powered by an external DC power adapter or a standard AC power supply. The motor is quartz-locked, providing accurate rotational speed.

Perhaps the SL-10's most unusual feature is its ability to play records in any position, even in a vertical position. In fact, records could be played upside down with the lid closed; the SL-10's internal disc clamp holds the record in place, and the tonearm, being dynamically balanced, maintains consistent tracking force regardless of the turntable position.

An example of the SL-10 is in the collection of the Museum of Modern Art.

== Specifications ==
Platter Type: 300 mm (11 3/4 in) diameter die-cast aluminium
Speed Accuracy: +/- 0.002%
Wow and Flutter: 0.025%
Rumble: -78 dB
Tonearm Type: Dynamic balanced linear tracking gimbal suspension
Effective Tonearm Length: 105 mm (4 1/4 in)
Original Cartridge: EPC-310MC
Cartridge Frequency Response: 10 to 60,000 Hz
Dimensions: 315 mm × 88 mm × 315 mm (12 1/2 in × 3 1/2 in × 12 1/2 in)
Weight: 6.5 kg (14 lb)
