= Direct-drive turntable =

Phonograph with motor connected directly to platter

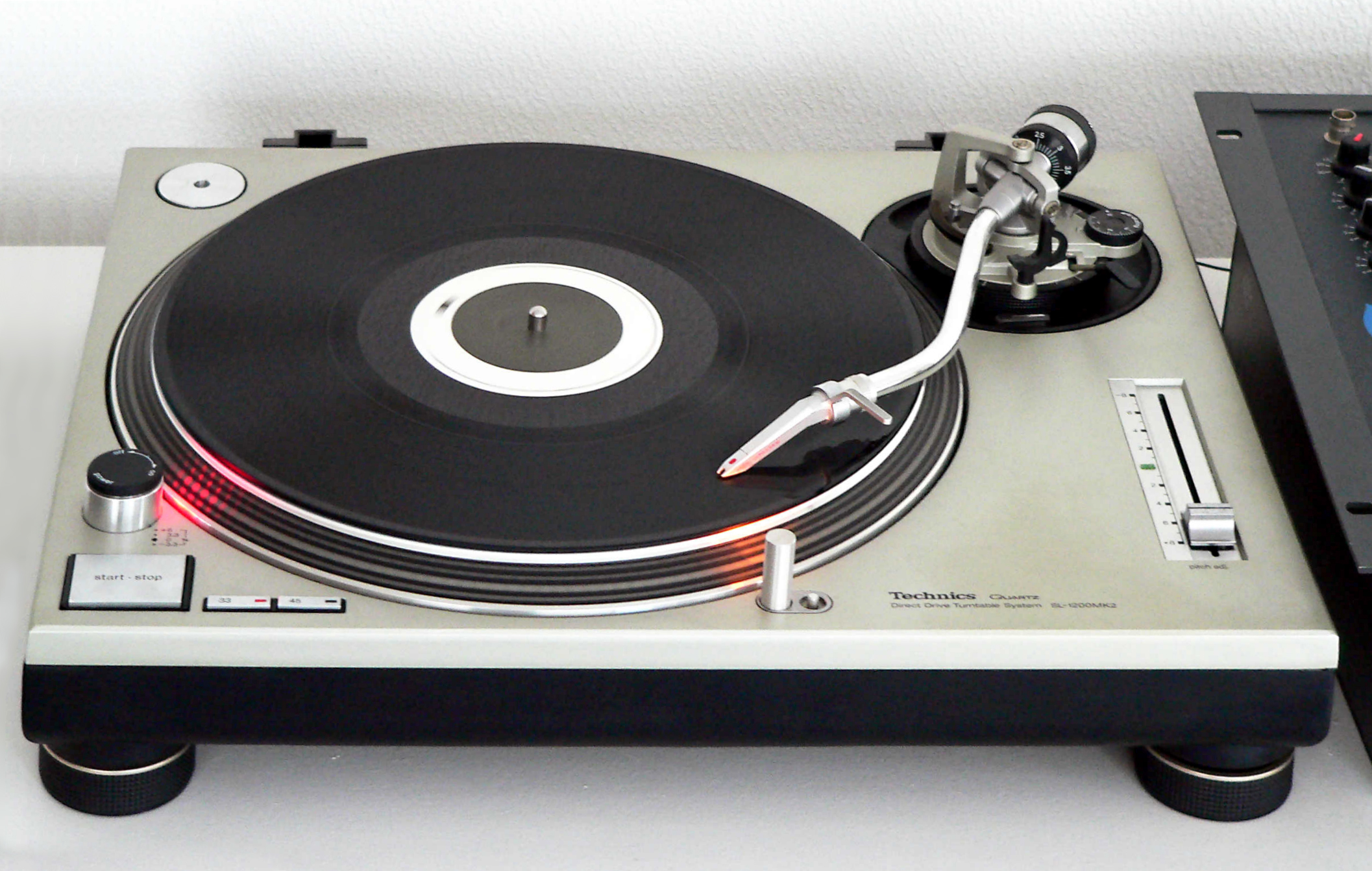
A Technics SL-1200 turntable, the direct-drive model most widely used in DJing.

A direct-drive turntable is one of the three main phonograph designs currently being produced. The other styles are the belt-drive turntable and the idler-wheel type. Each name is based upon the type of coupling used between the platter of the turntable and the motor.

Direct-drive turntables are currently the most popular phonographs, due to their widespread use for turntablism in DJ culture. Panasonic's Technics series were the first direct-drive turntables, and remain the most popular series of turntables.

== Design ==
In a direct-drive turntable the motor is located directly under the center of the platter and is connected to the platter directly. It is a significant advancement over older belt-drive turntables for turntablism, since belt drives have a slower start-up time and torque, and are prone to wear-and-tear and breakage, as the belt would break from backspinning or scratching. A direct-drive turntable eliminates belts, and instead employs a motor to directly drive a platter on which a vinyl record rests. This makes scratching possible, as the motor would continue to spin at the correct RPM even if the DJ wiggles the record back and forth on the platter.

On the other hand, direct-drive turntables may suffer from vibration due to the motor, which is less of an issue for belt-drive turntables. However, in recent years, shock-absorbing (less dense) material, placed between the motor and platter, has been used to cut back on vibrations. The torque on direct-drive turntables is usually much higher than on belt drive models. This means the platter speed is less susceptible to outside forces (stylus, hand). Higher torque also means the platter will accelerate to its proper speed faster so less distortion is heard when the record begins to play.

Some direct-drive turntables further reduce the separation of motor and platter by using the platter itself as the rotor in the turntable's synchronous motor. This means that there is no motor, per se, in the turntable - the platter is entirely driven by the magnetic field induced by the turntable's stator.

In all turntables a motor spins a metal disk at a constant speed. On top of the rotating disk (platter) is a mat and on top of the mat records are placed to be played. Traditionally rubber mats were used to hold the record in place so that it would not rotate independently of the platter. To allow for easy scratching and more tricks DJ use slipmat to reduce the friction between the spinning platter and record. The slipmat is often made of a felt-like material. This way a DJ can scratch the record while the platter continues to spin underneath. In direct-drive turntables, the slipmat also helps isolate the record from motor vibrations that would be picked up by the stylus.

Turntables for DJ use also include a pitch control, for fine tuning to the correct speed, used in conjunction with a strobe light, plus it also allows a DJ to mix using a technique known as beatmatching. From the late 1990s onwards manufacturers such as Vestax started to include other electronic controls such as reverse, and "nudge".

DJs and turntablists use all the above functions to assist them in musical performances.

== History ==
The first direct-drive turntable was invented by Shuichi Obata, an engineer at Matsushita (now Panasonic), based in Osaka, Japan. It eliminated belts, and instead employed a motor to directly drive a platter on which a vinyl record rests. In 1969, Matsushita released it as the SP-10, the first direct-drive turntable on the market, and the first in their influential Technics series of turntables. In 1971, Matsushita released the Technics SL-1100. Due to its strong motor, durability, and fidelity, it was adopted by early hip hop artists.

A forefather of turntablism was DJ Kool Herc, an immigrant from Jamaica to New York City. He introduced turntable techniques from Jamaican dub music, while developing new techniques made possible by the direct-drive turntable technology of the Technics SL-1100, which he used for the first sound system he set up after emigrating to New York. The signature technique he developed was playing two copies of the same record on two turntables in alternation to extend the b-dancers' favorite section, switching back and forth between the two to loop the breaks to a rhythmic beat.

The most influential turntable was the Technics SL-1200, which was developed in 1971 by a team led by Shuichi Obata at Matsushita, which then released it onto the market in 1972. It was adopted by New York City hip hop DJs such as Grand Wizzard Theodore and Afrika Bambaataa in the 1970s. As they experimented with the SL-1200 decks, they developed scratching techniques when they found that the motor would continue to spin at the correct RPM even if the DJ wiggled the record back and forth on the platter. Since then, turntablism spread widely in hip hop culture, and the SL-1200 remained the most widely used turntable in DJ culture for the next several decades.

Technics also introduced the first direct-drive tangential-arm turntable, the model SL-10, in 1981.
