= Clubbing (subculture) =

Contemporary subculture

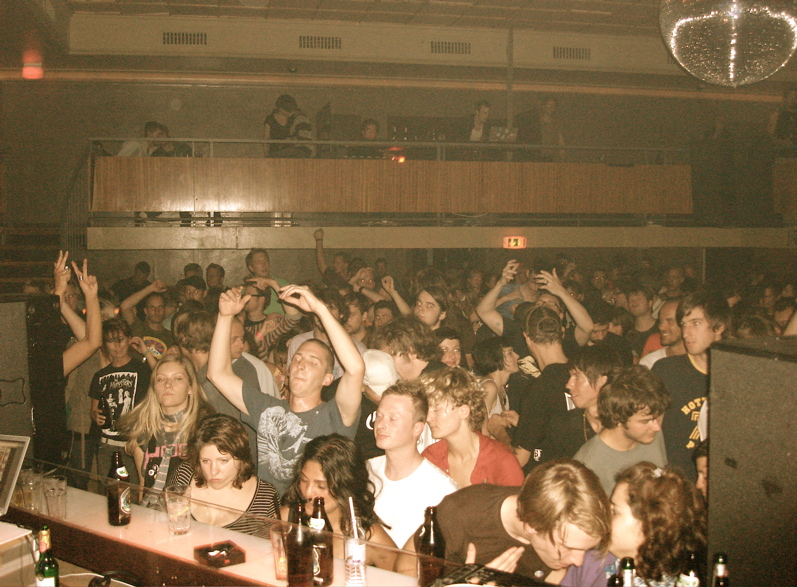
Clubbing scene at the Registratur, a techno club in Munich, Germany (2007)

Clubbing (also known as club culture, related to raving) is the activity of visiting and gathering socially at nightclubs (discotheques, discos or just clubs) and festivals. That includes socializing, listening to music, dancing. It is often done to hear new music on larger, high-end audio systems than one would usually have in one's home, or for socializing and meeting new people. Clubbing and raves have historically referred to grass-roots organized, anti-establishment and unlicensed all night dance parties, typically featuring electronically produced dance music, such as techno, house, trance and drum and bass.

== Music ==
Club music varies from a wide range of electronic dance music (EDM), which is a form of electronic music, such as house (and especially Deep house), techno, drum and bass, hip hop, electro, trance, funk, breakbeat, dubstep, disco. Music is usually performed by DJs who are playing tunes on turntables, CD players or laptops, using different additional techniques to express themselves such as beat juggling, scratching, beatmatching, needle drop, back spinning, phrasing and other tricks and gigs, depending on the type of music they are playing. They can mix two or more prerecorded tunes at the same time, or sometimes music is performed as a live act by musicians who play the sounds over a basic matrix, sometimes combined with a VJing performance.

== History ==
Clubbing was rooted in the disco wave of the 1970s, and developed in the American club scene in Chicago, New York and Detroit. It was initially predominantly popular with gay, black Americans, due to the social exclusion they had faced elsewhere. Mixing pre-existing musical styles to create their own, and combining this with newly available recreational drugs like MDMA, created a sense of hedonism and escape, and the formation of a community.

Other more mainstream clubs and DJs began to adopt the music, styles and drugs of the scene, which expanded the audience beyond the original black gay community. The subculture took shape in the late 1980s and early 1990s at underground rave parties in the U.S. and London. A particular contributor to this in the UK was the Ibiza club scene, through which British tourists were exposed to the twelve hour clubbing cycle. Numerous social changes have, however, occurred since then to transform this subculture into a mainstream movement, youth-oriented lifestyle and global activity.

From the beginning, clubbing, while it was more rave subculture, has involved mostly younger people between 16 and 25 years of age. A subculture emerged around raves, featuring an ethos of peace, love, unity, and respect (the PLUR doctrine), rooted in community and empathy for others. Today, however, Tammy L. Anderson says, the rave scene has given way to a more nightclub-based electronic dance music (EDM) scene featuring an older (18– 35 years of age) crowd which very much involves the consumption of alcohol.

== See also ==
- Studio 54
