= Phrasing =

Phrasing may refer to:

- Phrasing (DJ)
- Musical phrasing
- "Phrasing", a running gag in the 2009 television show Archer

== See also ==
- Phrase (disambiguation)
