= Back spinning =

Back spinning describes the act of manually manipulating a vinyl record (currently playing on a turntable), using enough force to cause the record to spin backward (despite the rotation of the platter beneath it), or of the similar action using a DJ controller of spinning back the jogwheel of the currently playing track. It is often used in DJing; many DJs use specialty slipmats so that friction will be reduced between the record and the platter. Back spinning is used to "rewind" the sound on a record to a previous point in the audio, to slip cue or cut music mixed live by a DJ, or in beat juggling (see: turntablism).

Usually, the sound of a backspin is a shrill, reversed version of the audio being bypassed. Since the sound easily stands out against other forms of music or ambient noise due to its uniqueness, it is usually muted by creative use of a DJ mixer. However, the sound is sometimes used as a sound effect, especially in its attachment to DJs and surrounding cultures such as hip hop.
