= Disc jockey =

Person who plays recorded music for an audience

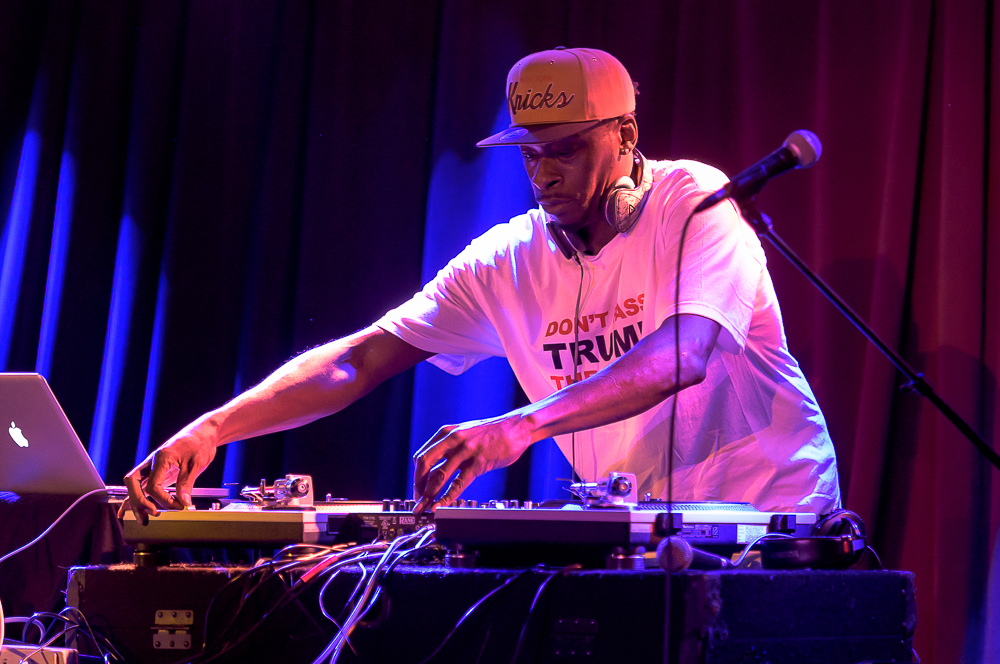
DJ Pete Rock performing at Rahzel and Friends – Brooklyn Bowl, 2016

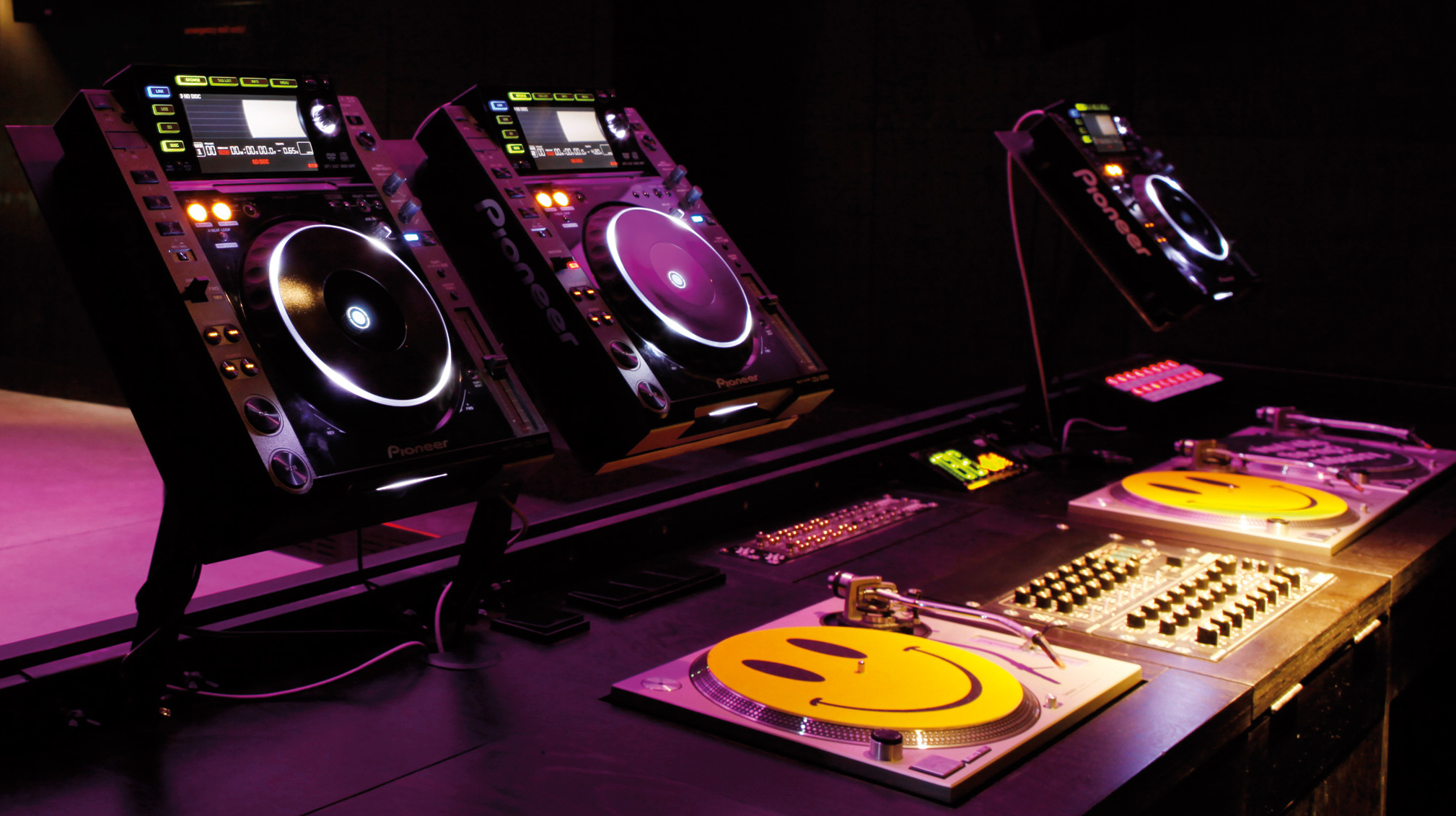
DJ booth in a nightclub, consisting of three CDJs (top), three turntables for vinyl records and a DJ mixer

A disc jockey, more commonly abbreviated as DJ, is a person who plays recorded music for an audience. Types of DJs include radio DJs (who host programs on music radio stations), club DJs (who work at nightclubs or music festivals), mobile DJs (who are hired to work at public and private events such as weddings, parties, or festivals), and turntablists (who use record players, usually turntables, to manipulate sounds on phonograph records). Originally, the "disc" in "disc jockey" referred to shellac and later vinyl records, but nowadays DJ is used as an all-encompassing term to also describe persons who mix music from other recording media such as cassettes, CDs or digital audio files on a CDJ, controller, or even a laptop. DJs may adopt the title "DJ" in front of their real names, adopted pseudonyms, or stage names.

DJs commonly use audio equipment that can play at least two sources of recorded music simultaneously. This enables them to blend tracks together to create transitions between recordings and develop unique mixes of songs. This can involve aligning the beats of the music sources so their rhythms and tempos do not clash when played together and enable a smooth transition from one song to another. DJs often use specialized DJ mixers, small audio mixers with crossfader and cue functions to blend or transition from one song to another. Mixers are also used to pre-listen to sources of recorded music in headphones and adjust upcoming tracks to mix with currently playing music. DJ software can be used with a DJ controller device to mix audio files on a computer instead of a console mixer. DJs may also use a microphone to speak to the audience; effects units such as reverb to create sound effects and electronic musical instruments such as drum machines and synthesizers.

== Etymology ==
The term "disc jockey" was ostensibly coined by radio gossip commentator Walter Winchell in 1935 to describe the radio work of Martin Block. The phrase first appeared in print in a 1941 Variety magazine. Originally, the word "disc" in "disc jockey" referred to phonograph or gramophone records and was used to describe radio personalities who introduced them on the air.

== Role ==
"DJ" is used as an all-encompassing term to describe someone who mixes recorded music from any source, including vinyl records, cassettes, CDs, or digital audio files. DJs typically perform for a live audience in a nightclub or dance club or a TV, radio broadcast audience, or an online radio audience. DJs also create mixes, remixes, and tracks that are recorded for later sale and distribution. Some DJs adopt the title "DJ" as part of their names. Professional DJs often specialize in a specific genre of music, such as techno, house, or hip-hop. DJs typically have extensive knowledge about the music they specialize in. Many DJs are avid music collectors of vintage, rare, or obscure tracks and records. An unreleased (or otherwise unnamed) track played or published by a DJ is known as an "ID". The term "ID" is additionally used to refer to an artist whose identity is unconfirmed (in reference to the author of an anonymous track), often with the possibility their name will be revealed at a later date.

== Types ==
=== Club DJs ===
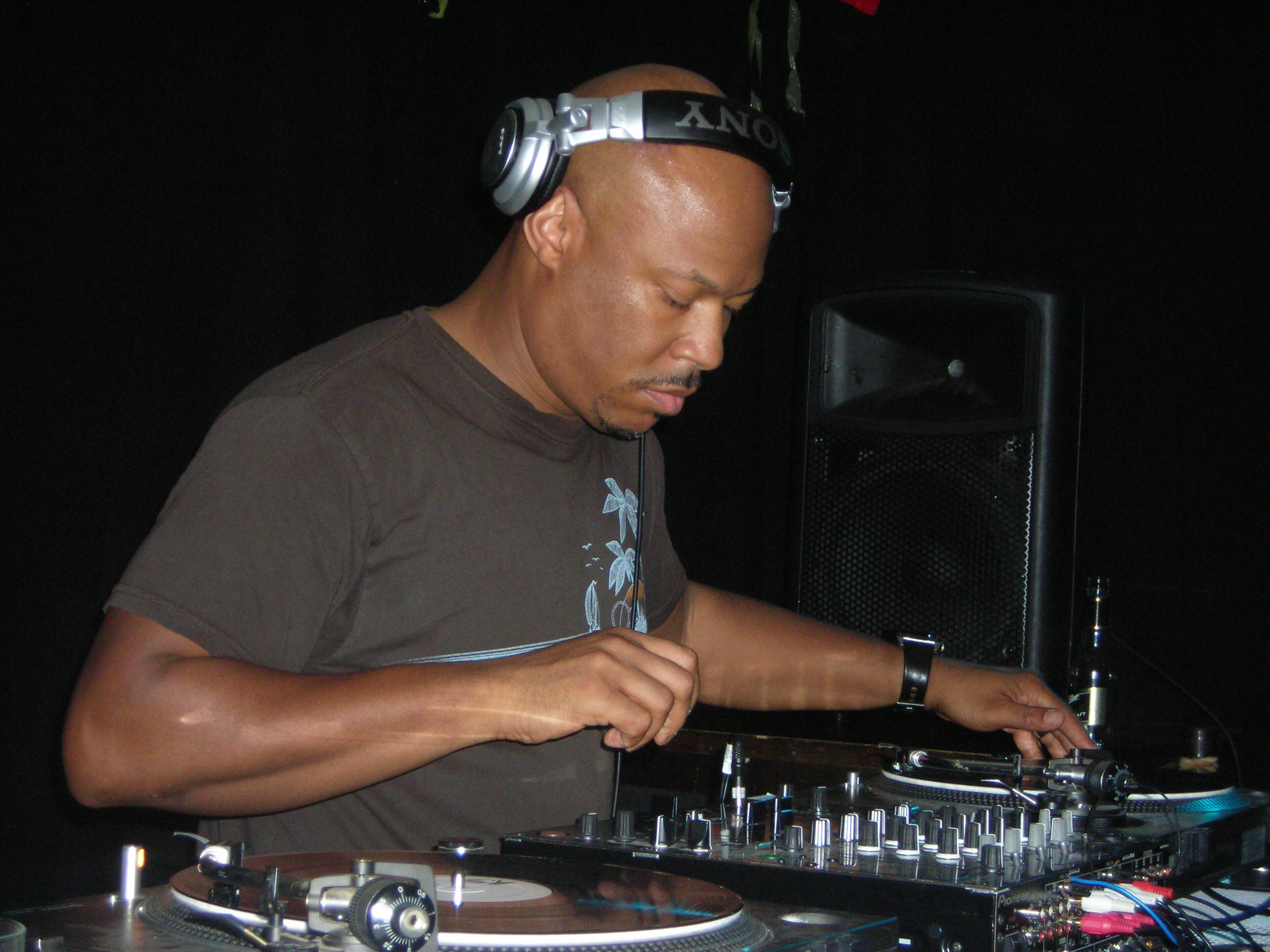
Club DJ Robert Hood, Dublin, Ireland 2009

Club DJs, commonly referred to as DJs in general, play music at musical events, such as parties at music venues or bars, clubs, music festivals, corporate, and private events. Typically, club DJs mix music recordings from two or more sources using different mixing techniques to produce a non-stop flow of music. Mixing began with hip-hop in the 1970s and would subsequently expand to other genres in especially (but not exclusively) dance music. A DJ who mostly plays and mixes one specific music genre is often given the title of that genre; for example, a DJ who plays hip-hop is called a hip-hop DJ, a DJ who plays house music is a house DJ, a DJ who plays techno is called a techno DJ, and so on.

The quality of a DJ performance (often called a DJ mix or DJ set) consists of two main features: technical skills, or how well the DJ can operate the equipment and produce smooth transitions between two or more recordings and a playlist; and the ability of a DJ to select the most suitable recordings, also known as "reading the crowd". One key technique used for seamlessly transitioning from one song to another is beatmatching.

=== Hip-hop DJs ===
In hip-hop, DJs may create beats, using percussion breaks, basslines, and other musical content sampled from pre-existing records. In hip-hop, rappers and MCs use these beats to rap over.

=== Radio DJs ===
Radio DJs or radio personalities introduce and play music broadcasts on AM, FM, digital, or Internet radio stations.

=== Dancehall and reggae deejays ===
In Jamaican music, a deejay (DJ) is a reggae or dancehall musician who sings and "toasts" (recites poetry) to an instrumental riddim. Deejays are not to be confused with DJs from other music genres, like hip-hop, where they select and play music. Dancehall and reggae DJs who select riddims to play are called selectors. Deejays whose style is nearer to singing are sometimes called singjays.

=== Turntablists ===
DJ Qbert performing in Rainbow Warehouse in Birmingham (video with close-up photography at the DJ mixer, though without sound)

A term coined by DJ Babu, Turntablists, also called battle DJs, use turntables and DJ mixer to manipulate recorded sounds to produce new music. In essence, they use DJ equipment as a musical instrument. Perhaps the best-known turntablist technique is scratching. Turntablists often participate in DJ contests like DMC World DJ Championships.

=== Residents ===
A resident DJ performs at a venue on a regular basis or permanently. They would perform regularly (typically under an agreement) in a particular discotheque, a particular club, a particular event, or a particular broadcasting station. Residents have a decisive influence on the club or a series of events. Per agreement with the management or company, the DJ would have to perform under agreed times and dates. Typically, DJs perform as residents for two or three times in a week, for example, on Friday and Saturday. DJs who make a steady income from a venue are also considered resident DJs.

=== Other types ===
- Bedroom DJs – A non-professional DJ who mixes music in their room as a hobby, rather than on radio or in a music venue such as a bar or a nightclub. Bedroom DJs are normally motivated by a desire to hone their skills and have fun with friends. Many professional DJs start out as bedroom DJs but not all bedroom DJs want to become professional – some are content being hobbyists. Most bedroom DJs generally have small set-ups of basic equipment. They might be learning how to DJ on a laptop or have a controller.
- Mobile DJs – DJs with their own portable audio sound systems who specialize in performing at gatherings such as block parties, street fairs, taverns, weddings, birthdays, school and corporate events. Mobile DJs may also offer lighting packages and video systems.

- DJanes – a term describing women DJs used in countries such as Germany that employ grammatical gender in their languages
- Celebrity DJs – widely known celebrities performing as DJs.

== Female DJs ==
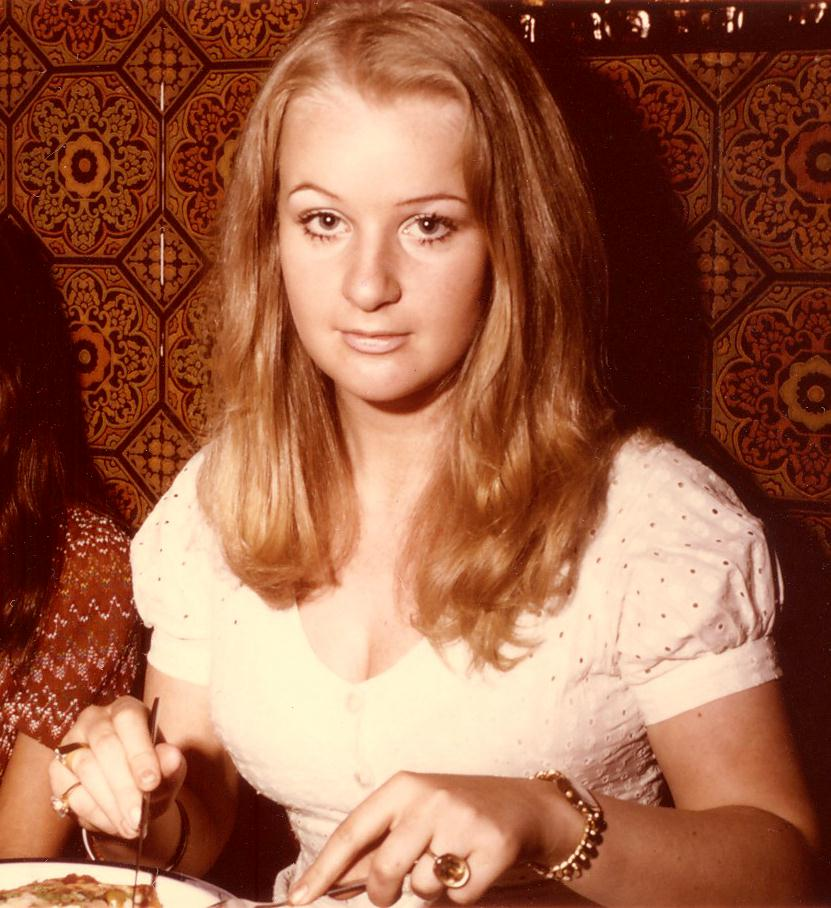
Sweden's first female disc jockey was Jill Wernström (1971)

In Western popular music, even though there are relatively few women DJs and turntablists, women musicians have achieved great success in singing and songwriting roles, however, they are given much less representation than men DJs. Part of this may stem from a generally low percentage of women in audio technology-related jobs. A 2013 Sound on Sound article by Rosina Ncube stated that there are "... few women in record production and sound engineering." Ncube states that "[n]inety-five percent of music producers are male, and although there are women producers achieving great things in music, they are less well-known than their counterparts." The vast majority of students in music technology programs are male. In hip-hop, the low percentage of women DJs and turntablists may stem from the overall men's domination of the entire hip-hop music industry. Most of the top rappers, MCs, DJs, record producers and music executives are men. There are a small number of high-profile women, but they are rare.

In 2007, Mark Katz's article "Men, Women, and Turntables: Gender and the DJ Battle", stated that "very few women [do turntablism] battle[s]; the matter has been a topic of conversation among hip-hop DJs for years." In 2010, Rebekah Farrugia said "the male-centricity of electronic dance music (EDM) culture" contributes to "a marginalisation of women in these [EDM] spaces." While turntablism and broader DJ practices should not be conflated, Katz suggests use or lack of use of the turntable broadly by women across genres and disciplines is impacted upon by what he defines as "male technophilia". Historian Ruth Oldenziel concurs in her writing on engineering with this idea of socialization as a central factor in the lack of engagement with technology. She says:

an exclusive focus on women's supposed failure to enter the field – is insufficient for understanding how our stereotypical notions have come into being; it tends to put the burden of proof entirely on women and to [unreasonably] blame them for their supposedly inadequate socialization, their lack of aspiration, and their want of masculine values. An equally challenging question is why and how boys have come to love things technical, how boys have historically been socialized as technophiles.

Lucy Green has focused on gender in relation to musical performers and creators, and specifically on educational frameworks as they relate to both. She suggests that women's alienation from "areas that have a strong technological tendency such as DJing, sound engineering and producing" are "not necessarily about their dislike of these instruments but relates to the interrupting effect of their dominantly masculine delineations". Despite this, women and girls do increasingly engage in turntable and DJ practices, individually and collectively, and "carve out spaces for themselves in EDM and DJ Culture". Some artists and collectives go beyond these practices to be more gender inclusive.

=== Notable female DJs (2000s–present) ===
The following alphabetical selection lists 50 widely covered women DJs active since the 2000s, reflecting sustained coverage in international polls, critics' lists and major media (e.g., DJ Mag's Top 100 DJs, Billboard's Dance 100, Mixmag, and Resident Advisor). See also recurring international rankings and end-of-year features that document women's prominence in DJ culture.

- Alison Wonderland – Australian DJ and producer working across bass and electro-pop, noted for large-scale festival performances.
- Amelie Lens – Belgian techno DJ and label head of KNTXT, associated with peak-time, hard-edged sets.
- Anna Lunoe – Australian house DJ, vocalist and producer; also known for international radio and club residencies.
- Anja Schneider – German techno/house DJ and producer; longtime label curator and A&R.
- Annie Mac – Irish DJ and broadcaster, former BBC Radio 1 host and champion of emergent dance acts.
- Annie Nightingale – British broadcaster and pioneering BBC Radio 1 DJ who helped mainstream club culture.
- B.Traits – Canadian DJ/producer and former BBC Radio 1 presenter with a multi-genre club and radio profile.
- Cassy – Austrian-born house/techno DJ, producer and vocalist with residencies at leading European clubs.
- Charlotte de Witte – Belgian techno DJ/producer and KNTXT founder, known for high-intensity, streamlined techno.
- Chloé – French DJ/producer associated with minimal, electro and filmic electronics; runs Lumière Noire.
- DJ Minx – Detroit house/techno DJ and founder of Women on Wax, active since the 1990s.
- DJ Paulette – British house DJ with historic residencies at Hacienda, Ministry of Sound and Paris clubs.
- DJ Rap – British DJ/producer linked to drum and bass and jungle; founder of Propa Talent.
- DJ Rekha – British-born, US-based DJ credited with popularizing bhangra in New York through Basement Bhangra.
- DJ Soda – South Korean EDM/pop DJ with a mainstream festival and club presence across Asia.
- DJ Spinderella – American DJ best known as member of Salt-N-Pepa and as a solo club DJ.
- Eclair Fifi – Scottish DJ and curator associated with the LuckyMe collective and forward-looking club music.
- Ellen Allien – German techno DJ/producer; founder of BPitch Control and fixture of Berlin's scene.
- HAAi – Australian-born, London-based DJ/producer blending psychedelic textures with techno and left-field dance.
- Hannah Wants – British house/bass DJ recognized for energetic club sets and UK radio work.
- Heidi – Canadian-born DJ known for jackin' house and techno; creator of the Jackathon brand.
- Helena Hauff – German DJ/producer famed for raw electro, acid and industrial-leaning techno.
- Honey Dijon – Chicago-born house DJ/producer with deep roots in US club culture and fashion collaborations.
- Ikonika – British DJ/producer associated with Hyperdub and UK bass/experimental club sounds.
- Jayda G – Canadian DJ/producer bridging disco, house and contemporary club music.
- K-Hand – Detroit techno/house DJ and producer; founder of Acacia Records and early Motor City pioneer.
- Kemistry & Storm – British drum-and-bass duo closely associated with Metalheadz and UK club culture.
- Lady Starlight – American DJ and live techno performer known for hardware-driven sets.
- Laurel Halo – American electronic musician and DJ spanning experimental techno, ambient and sound art.
- Magda – Polish-born American DJ tied to minimal techno and the Minus/Detroit networks.
- Mary Anne Hobbs – English DJ and curator known for radio advocacy of experimental and bass music.
- Maya Jane Coles – British-Japanese DJ/producer across deep and tech house, also records as Nocturnal Sunshine.
- Mija – American DJ/producer working between house, bass and indie-leaning club sounds.
- Miss Djax – Dutch DJ/producer; founder of Djax-Up-Beats and influential in European techno.
- Miss Kittin – French DJ/singer central to electroclash and electro-techno, often with The Hacker.
- Miss Monique – Ukrainian progressive and melodic house DJ/producer; known for widely viewed mixes.
- Monika Kruse – German techno DJ/producer and Terminal M label founder with decades-long career.
- Nastia – Ukrainian DJ/label owner (Propaganda) noted for fast, percussive techno sets.
- Nicole Moudaber – Lebanese-Nigerian DJ/producer; runs MOOD Records and global techno events.
- Nina Kraviz – Russian DJ/producer spanning techno, acid and trance; founder of трип (Trip) label.
- Nina Las Vegas – Australian DJ/curator and former Triple J presenter; head of the NLV Records imprint.
- Nora En Pure – South African-Swiss DJ/producer associated with deep and melodic house; leads Purified brand.
- Paula Temple – British techno DJ/producer known for abrasive, industrial-leaning sound design.
- Peggy Gou – South Korean DJ/producer; Gudu Records founder with global club and festival profile.
- Rezz – Canadian DJ/producer recognized for mid-tempo, hypnotic bass music and immersive visuals.
- Sama' Abdulhadi – Palestinian techno DJ/producer and prominent figure in the West Asian scene.
- Soledad Rodríguez Zubieta – Argentine DJ, radio host and music curator noted for "sonic decoration" in hospitality and retail.
- TOKiMONSTA – American producer/DJ blending hip-hop and electronic; founder of Young Art Records.
- Yaeji – Korean-American singer/producer/DJ combining house, pop and bilingual vocals in club contexts.

== Equipment ==
DJs use equipment that enables them to play multiple sources of recorded music and mix them to create seamless transitions and unique arrangements of songs. An important tool for DJs is the specialized DJ mixer, a small audio mixer with a crossfader and cue functions. The crossfader enables the DJ to blend or transition from one song to another. The cue knobs or switches allow the DJ to listen to a source of recorded music in headphones before playing it for the live club or broadcast audience. Previewing the music in headphones helps the DJ pick the next track they want to play, cue up the track to the desired starting location, and align the two tracks' beats in traditional situations where auto-sync technology is not being used. This process ensures that the selected song will mix well with the currently playing music. DJs may align the beats of the music sources so their rhythms do not clash when they are played together to help create a smooth transition from one song to another. Other equipment may include a microphone, effects units such as reverb, and electronic musical instruments such as drum machines and synthesizers.

As music technology has progressed, DJs have adopted different types of equipment to play and mix music, all of which are still commonly used. Traditionally, DJs used two turntables plugged into a DJ mixer to mix music on vinyl records. As compact discs became popular media for publishing music, specialized high-quality CD players known as CDJs were developed for DJs. CDJs can take the place of turntables or be used together with turntables. Many CDJs can now play digital music files from USB flash drives or SD cards in addition to CDs. With the spread of portable laptops, tablets, and smartphone computers, DJs began using software together with specialized sound cards and DJ controller hardware. DJ software can be used in conjunction with a hardware DJ mixer or be used instead of a hardware mixer.

=== Turntables ===
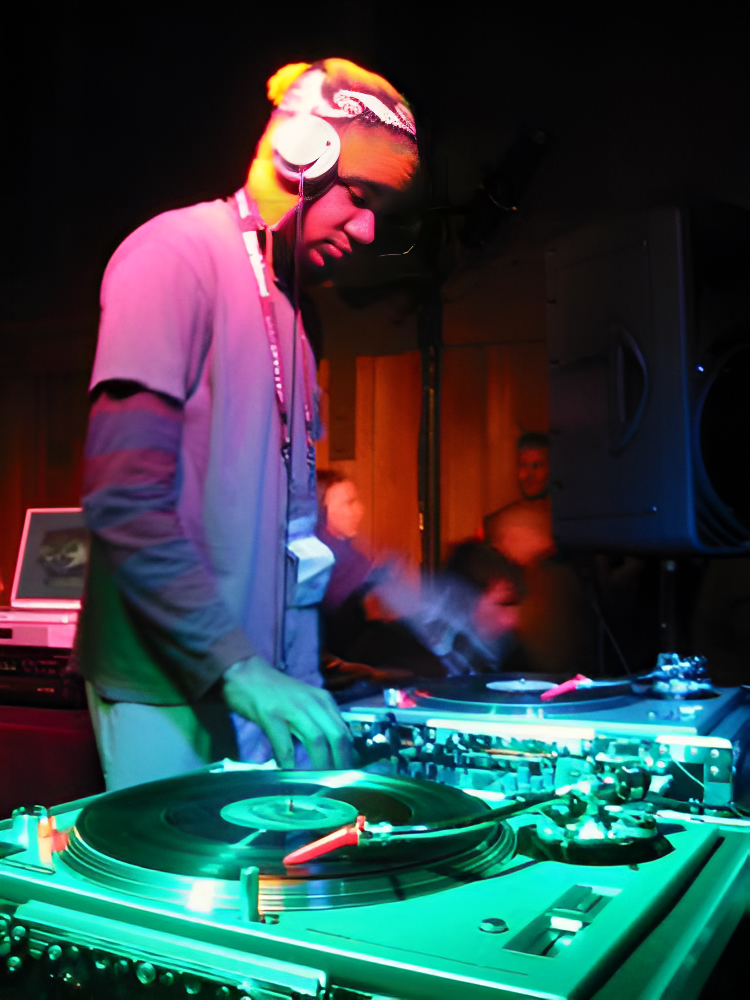
DJ Spooky at the Sundance Film Festival in 2003, using two Technics SL-1200 turntables and a DJ mixer

Turntables allow DJs to play vinyl records. By adjusting the playback speed of the turntable, either by adjusting the speed knob or by manipulating the platter (e.g., by slowing down the platter by putting a finger gently along the side), DJs can match the tempos of different records so their rhythms can be played together at the same time without clashing or make a smooth, seamless transition from one song to another. This technique is known as beatmatching. DJs typically replace the rubber mat on turntables that keep the record moving in sync with the turntable with a slipmat that facilitates manipulating the playback of the record by hand. With the slipmat, the DJ can stop or slow down the record while the turntable is still spinning. Direct-drive turntables are the type preferred by DJs. Belt-drive turntables are less expensive, but they are not suitable for turntablism and DJing, because the belt-drive motor can be damaged by this type of manipulation. Some DJs, most commonly those who play hip-hop, go beyond merely mixing records and use turntables as musical instruments for scratching, beat juggling, and other turntablism techniques.

=== CDJs/media players ===
CDJs / media players are high-quality digital media players made for DJing. They often have large jog wheels and pitch controls to allow DJs to manipulate the playback of digital files for beatmatching similar to how DJs manipulate vinyl records on turntables. CDJs often have features such as loops and waveform displays similar to DJ software. Originally designed to play music from compact discs, they now can play digital music files stored on USB flash drives and SD cards. Some CDJs can also connect to a computer running DJ software to act as a DJ controller. Modern media players have the ability to stream music from online music providers such as Beatport, Beatsource, Tidal, and SoundCloud GO.

=== DJ mixers ===
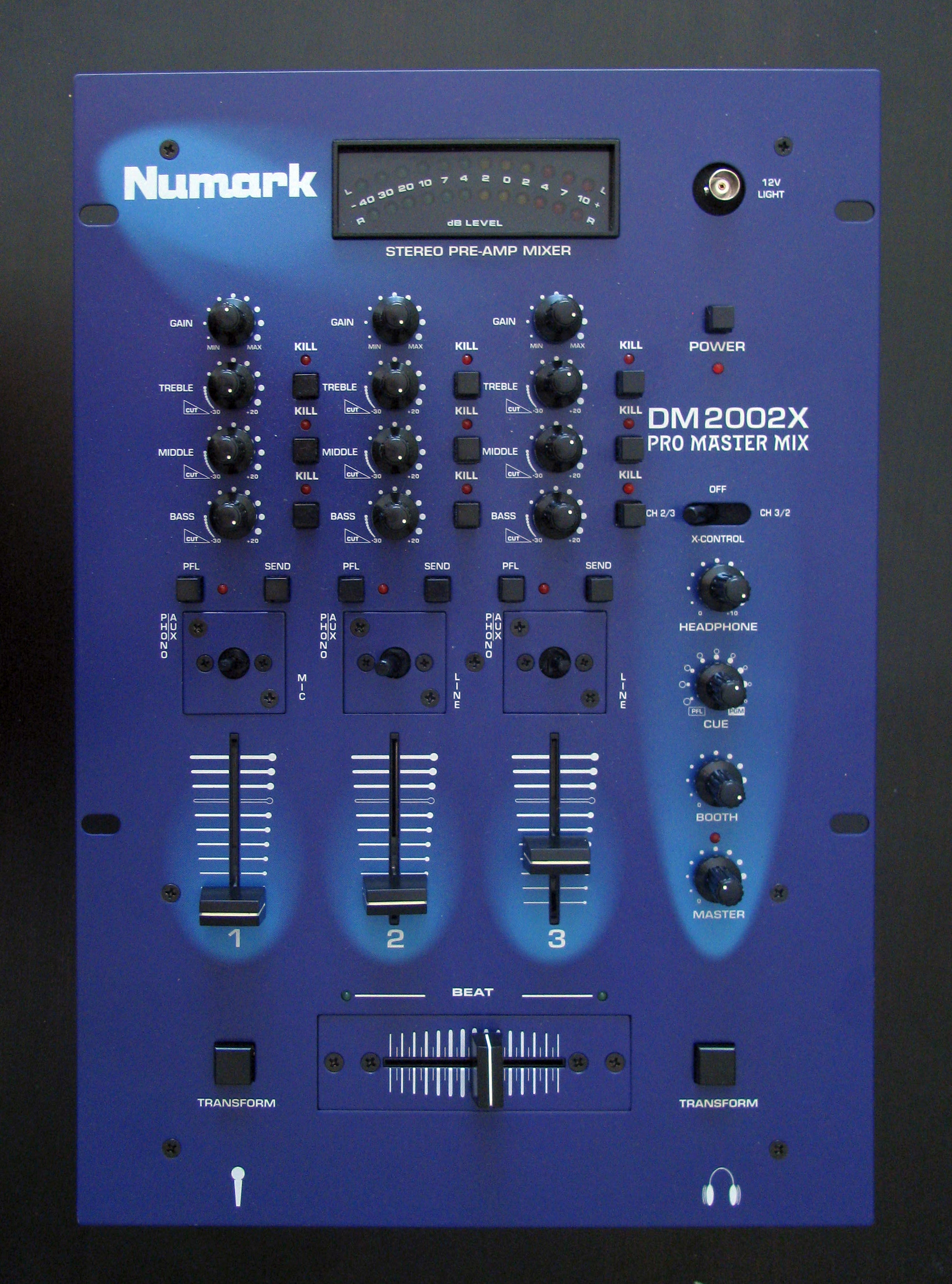
A Numark DM2002X Pro Master DJ mixer. This three-channel mixer can have up to three input sound sources. The gain control knobs and equalization control knobs allow the volume and tone of each sound source to be adjusted. The vertical faders allow for further adjustment of the volume of each sound source. The horizontally-mounted crossfader enables the DJ to smoothly transition from a song on one sound source to a song from a different sound source.

DJ mixers are small audio mixing consoles specialized for DJing. Most DJ mixers have far fewer channels than a mixer used by a record producer or audio engineer; whereas standard live sound mixers in small venues have 12 to 24 channels, and standard recording studio mixers have even more (as many as 72 on large boards), basic DJ mixers may have only two channels. While DJ mixers have many of the same features found on larger mixers (faders, equalization knobs, gain knobs, effects units, etc.), DJ mixers have a feature that is usually only found on DJ mixers: the crossfader. The crossfader is a type of fader that is mounted horizontally. DJs used the crossfader to mix two or more sound sources. The midpoint of the crossfader's travel is a 50/50 mix of the two channels (on a two-channel mixer). The far left side of the crossfader provides only the channel A sound source. The far right side provides only the channel B sound source (e.g., record player number 2). Positions in between the two extremes provide different mixes of the two channels. Some DJs use a computer with DJ software and a DJ controller instead of an analog DJ mixer to mix music, although DJ software can be used in conjunction with a hardware DJ mixer.

=== Headphones ===
DJs generally use higher-quality headphones than those designed for music consumers. DJ headphones have other properties useful for DJs, such as designs that acoustically isolate the sounds of the headphones from the outside environment (hard shell headphones), flexible headbands and pivot joints to allow DJs to listen to one side of the headphones while turning the other headphone away (so they can monitor the mix in the club), and replaceable cables. Replaceable cables enable DJs to buy new cables if a cable becomes frayed, worn, or damaged, or if a cable is accidentally cut.

Closed-back headphones are highly recommended for DJs to block outside noise as the environment of DJ usually tends to be very noisy. Standard headphones have a 3.5mm jack but DJ equipment usually requires ¼ inch jack. Most specialized DJ Headphones have an adapter to switch between a 3.5mm jack and ¼ inch jack. Detachable coiled cables are perfect for DJ Headphones.

=== Software ===
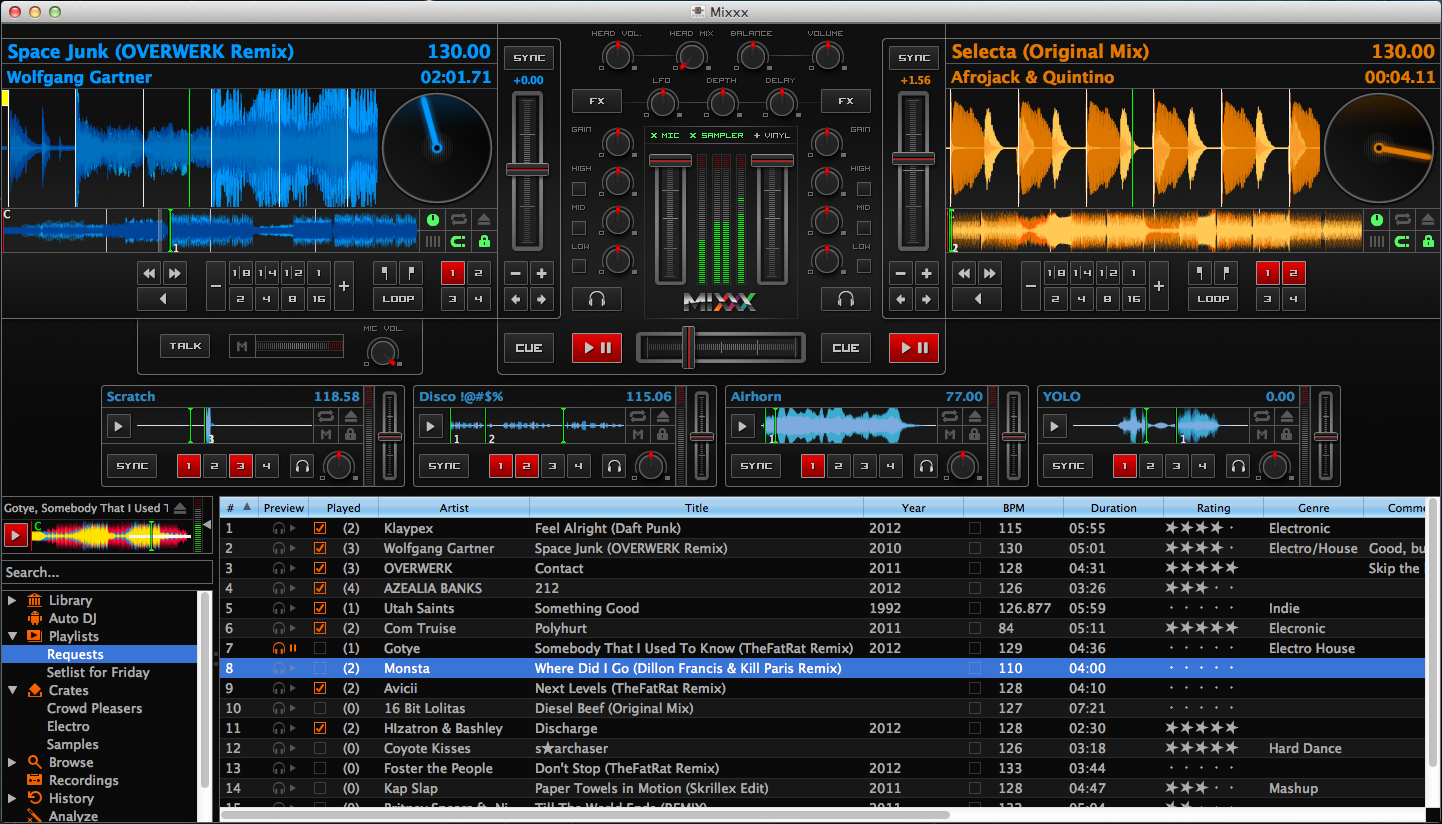
A screenshot of Mixxx DJ software running on Mac OS X

DJs have changed their equipment as new technologies are introduced. The earliest DJs in pop music, in 1970s discos, used record turntables, vinyl records and audio consoles. In the 1970s, DJs would have to lug heavy direct-drive turntables and crates of records to clubs and shows. In the 1980s, many DJs transitioned to compact cassettes. In the 1990s and 2000s, many DJs switched to using digital audio such as CDs and MP3 files. As technological advances made it practical to store large collections of digital music files on a laptop computer, DJ software was developed so DJs could use a laptop as a source of music instead of transporting CDs or vinyl records to gigs. Unlike most music player software designed for regular consumers, DJ software can play at least two audio files simultaneously, display the waveforms of the files on screen and enable the DJ to listen to either source.

The waveforms allow the DJ to see what is coming next in the music and how the playback of different files is aligned. The software analyzes music files to identify their tempo and where the beats are. The analyzed information can be used by the DJ to help manually beatmatch like with vinyl records or the software can automatically synchronize the beats. Digital signal processing algorithms in software allow DJs to adjust the tempo of recordings independently of their pitch and musical key, a feature known as "keylock". Some software analyzes the loudness of the music for automatic normalization with ReplayGain and detects the musical key. Additionally, DJ software can store cue points, set loops, and apply effects.

As tablet computers and smartphones became widespread, DJ software was written to run on these devices in addition to laptops. DJ software requires specialized hardware in addition to a computer to fully take advantage of its features. The consumer-grade, regular sound card integrated into most computer motherboards can only output two channels (one stereo pair). However, DJs need to be able to output at least four channels (two stereo pairs, thus Left and Right for input 1 and Left and Right for input 2), either unmixed signals to send to a DJ mixer or the main output plus a headphone output. Additionally, DJ sound cards output higher-quality signals than the sound cards built into consumer-grade computer motherboards.

=== Timecode ===
Special vinyl records (or CDs/digital files played with CDJs) can be used with DJ software to play digital music files with DJ software as if they were pressed onto vinyl, allowing turntablism techniques to be used with digital files. These vinyl records do not have music recordings pressed onto them. Instead, they are pressed with timecode for controlling DJ software. The DJ software interprets changes in the playback speed, direction, and position of the timecode signal and manipulates the digital files it is playing in the same way that the turntable manipulates the timecode record.

A system that uses timecode vinyl is called a digital vinyl system (DVS). Some DVS systems require a specialized DJ sound card with at least 4 channels (2 stereo pairs) of inputs and outputs. With this setup, the DJ software typically outputs unmixed signals from the music files to an external hardware DJ mixer. Some DJ mixers have integrated USB sound cards that allow DJ software to connect directly to the mixer without requiring a separate sound card.

=== DJ controllers ===
A DJ software can be used to mix audio files on the computer instead of a separate hardware mixer. When mixing on a computer, DJs often use a DJ controller device that mimics the layout of two turntables plus a DJ mixer to control the software rather than the computer keyboard & touchpad on a laptop, or the touchscreen on a tablet computer or smartphone. Many DJ controllers have an integrated sound card with 4 output channels (2 stereo pairs) that allow the DJ to use headphones to preview music before playing it on the main output.

=== Other equipment ===
- A microphone, so that the DJ can introduce songs and speak to the audience over the sound system
- Electronic effects units such as delay, reverb, octave, equalizer, chorus, etc.
- Multi-stylus head shells, which allow a DJ to play different grooves of the same record at the same time
- Synthesizers, Samplers, sequencers, or drum machines
- PA system or sound reinforcement system (power amplifiers and speaker enclosures), typically including subwoofer cabinets for deep bass (or, if a DJ is broadcasting and/or recording a set, broadcasting equipment or recording gear)
- Monitor speakers, for listening to the "house mix" that is playing over the main speakers

== Techniques ==
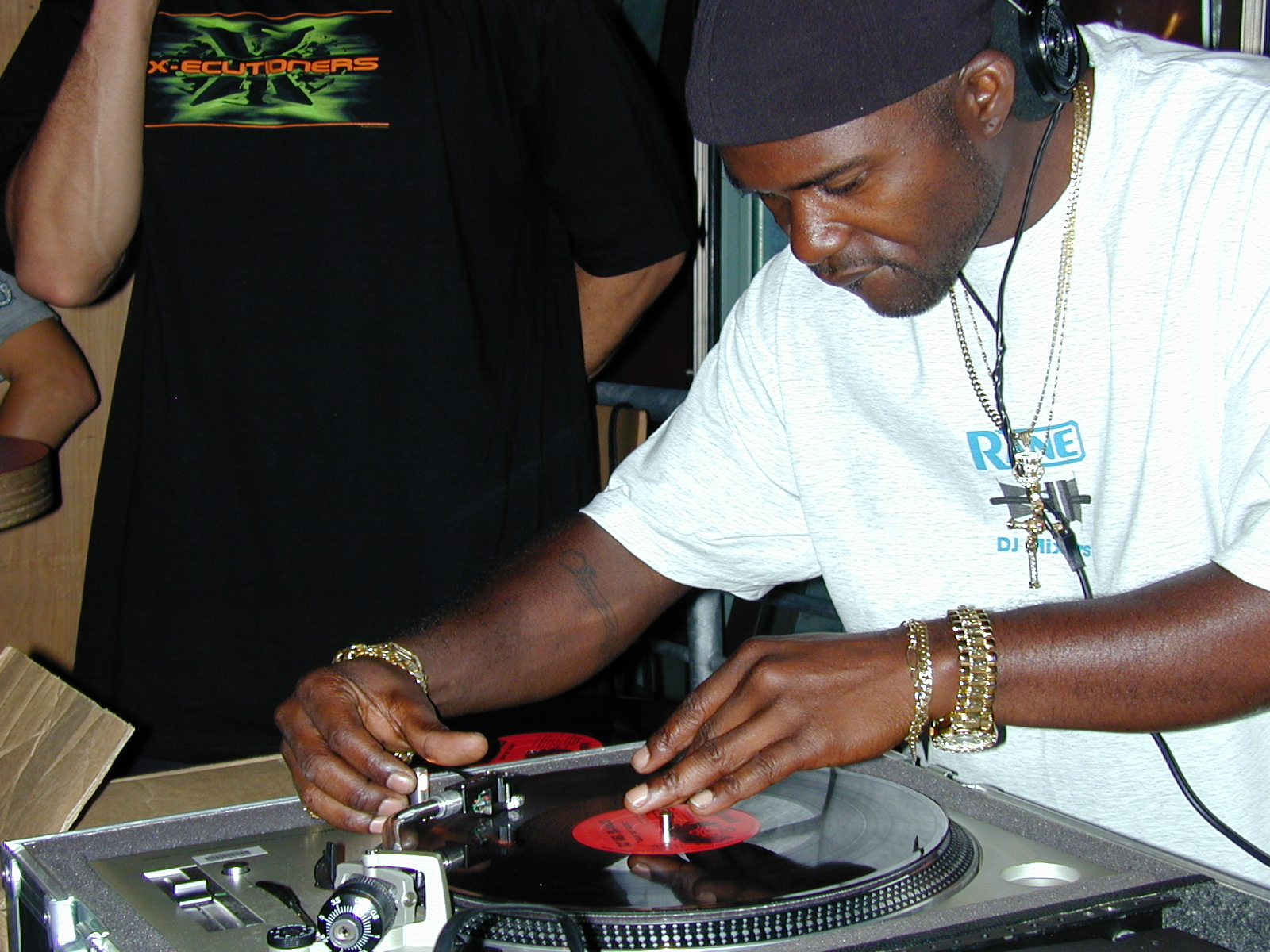
In the early 1970s in the South Bronx Grand Wizzard Theodore invented the "DJ scratch" technique, here he is doing his famous "needle drop" at the Experience Music Project in Seattle 2002

Several techniques are used by DJs as a means to better mix and blend recorded music. These techniques primarily include the cueing, equalization and audio mixing of two or more sound sources. The complexity and frequency of special techniques depend largely on the setting in which a DJ is working. Radio DJs are less likely to focus on advanced music-mixing procedures than club DJs, who rely on a smooth transition between songs using a range of techniques. However, some radio DJs are experienced club DJs, so they use the same sophisticated mixing techniques.

Club DJ turntable techniques include beatmatching, phrasing and slip-cueing to preserve energy on a dance floor. Turntablism embodies the art of cutting, beat juggling, scratching, needle drops, phase shifting, back spinning and more to perform the transitions and overdubs of samples in a more creative manner (although turntablism is often considered a use of the turntable as a musical instrument rather than a tool for blending recorded music). Professional DJs may use harmonic mixing to choose songs that are in compatible musical keys. Other techniques include chopping, screwing and looping.

Recent advances in technology in both DJ hardware and software can provide assisted or automatic completion of some traditional DJ techniques and skills. Examples include phrasing and beatmatching, which can be partially or completely automated by using DJ software that performs automatic synchronization of sound recordings, a feature commonly labelled "sync". Most DJ mixers now include a beat counter which analyzes the tempo of an incoming sound source and displays its tempo in beats per minute (BPM), which may assist with beatmatching analog sound sources.

In the past, being a DJ has largely been a self-taught craft but with the complexities of new technologies and the convergence with music production methods, there are a growing number of schools and organizations that offer instruction on the techniques.

=== Miming ===
In DJ culture, miming refers to the practice of DJs pantomiming the actions of live-mixing a set on stage while a pre-recorded mix plays over the sound system. Miming mixing in a live performance is considered to be controversial within DJ culture. Some within the DJ community say that miming is increasingly used as a technique by celebrity model DJs who may lack mixing skills, but can draw big crowds to a venue.

== History ==
Playing recorded music for dancing and parties rose with the mass marketing of home phonographs in the late 19th century.

British radio disc jockey Jimmy Savile hosted his first live dance party in 1943 using a single turntable and a makeshift sound system. Four years later, Savile began using two turntables welded together to form a single DJ console. In 1947, the Whisky à Gogo opened in Paris as the first discotheque. In 1959, one of the first discos in Germany, the Scotch Club, opened in Aachen and visiting journalist Klaus Quirini (later DJ Heinrich) made comments, conducted audience games, and announced songs while playing records. The first song he played was the hit Ein Schiff wird kommen by Lale Andersen.

While the "Scotch-Club" in Aachen, where journalist Klaus Quirini (DJ Heinrich) became one of the first DJs to moderate between songs in 1959, is noted as an early discotheque, the country's DJ culture evolved significantly in subsequent decades.

In the 1960s, Rudy Bozak began making the first DJ mixers, mixing consoles specialized for DJing. In the late 1960s to early 1970s Jamaican sound system culture, producer and sound system operator (DJ), (Jamaican) King Tubby and producer Lee "Scratch" Perry were pioneers of the genre known as dub music. They experimented with tape-based composition; emphasized repetitive rhythmic structures (often stripped of their harmonic elements); electronically manipulated spatiality; sonically manipulated pre-recorded musical materials from mass media; and remixed music among other innovative techniques. It is widely known that the Jamaican dancehall culture has had and continues to have a significant impact on the American hip-hop culture.

The stylized term of "deejay" originated in the 1960s and 1970s when reggae performers such as U-Roy and King Stitt toasted over the instrumental (dub music) versions of popular records. These versions were often released on the flip side to the song's 45 record. This gave the deejays the chance to create on-the-fly lyrics to the music. Big Youth, and I-Roy were famous deejays in Jamaica.

DJ turntablism has origins in the invention of direct-drive turntables. Early belt-drive turntables were unsuitable for turntablism and mixing, since they had a slow start-up time, and they were prone to wear-and-tear and breakage, as the belt would break from backspinning or scratching. The first direct-drive turntable was invented by engineer Shuichi Obata at Matsushita (now Panasonic), based in Osaka, Japan. It eliminated belts, and instead employed a motor to directly drive a platter on which a vinyl record rests. In 1969, Matsushita released it as the SP-10, the first direct-drive turntable on the market, and the first in their influential Technics series of turntables.

In 1972, Technics started making their SL-1200 turntable, featuring high torque direct drive design. The SL-1200 had a rapid start and its durable direct drive enabled DJs to manipulate the platter, as with scratching techniques. Hip-hop DJs began using the Technics SL-1200s as musical instruments to manipulate records with turntablism techniques such as scratching and beat juggling rather than merely mixing records. These techniques were developed in the 1970s by DJ Kool Herc, Grand Wizard Theodore, and Afrika Bambaataa, as they experimented with Technics direct-drive decks, finding that the motor would continue to spin at the correct RPM even if the DJ wiggled the record back and forth on the platter.

Hip-hop DJs started with DJ Kool Herc, Grandmaster Flash, and Afrika Bambaataa who were members of a block party at South Bronx from 1973 onwards. Kool Herc played records such as James Brown's "Give It Up or Turnit a Loose", Jimmy Castor's "It's Just Begun", Booker T. & the M.G.'s' "Melting Pot", Incredible Bongo Band's "Bongo Rock" and "Apache", and UK rock band Babe Ruth's "The Mexican". With Bronx clubs struggling with street gangs, uptown DJs catering to an older disco crowd with different aspirations, and commercial radio also catering to a demographic distinct from teenagers in the Bronx, Herc's parties had a ready-made audience.

DJ Kool Herc developed the style that was the blueprint for hip-hop. Herc used the record to focus on a short, heavily percussive part in it: the "break". Since this part of the record was the one the dancers liked best, Herc isolated the break and prolonged it by changing between two record players. As one record reached the end of the break, he cued a second record back to the beginning of the break, which allowed him to extend a relatively short section of music into a "five-minute loop of fury". This innovation had its roots in what Herc called "The Merry-Go-Round", a technique by which the DJ switched from break to break at the height of the party. This technique is specifically called "The Merry-Go-Round" because according to Herc, it takes one "back and forth with no slack."

During the 1970s disco era, Germany developed a distinct global influence with the "Munich Sound." Producers based in Munich, most notably Giorgio Moroder, pioneered a synthesizer-heavy, hypnotic disco sound that influenced producers and DJs worldwide.

In 1980, Japanese company Roland released the TR-808, an analog rhythm/drum machine, which has unique artificial sounds, such as its booming bass and sharp snare, and a metronome-like rhythm. Yellow Magic Orchestra's use of the instrument in 1980 influenced hip-hop pioneer Afrika Bambaataa, after which the TR-808 would be widely adopted by hip-hop DJs, with 808 sounds remaining central to hip-hop music ever since. The Roland TB-303, a bass synthesizer released in 1981, had a similar impact on electronic dance music genres such as techno and house music, along with Roland's TR-808 and TR-909 drum machines.

In 1982, the Compact Disc (CD) format was released, popularizing digital audio. In 1998, the first MP3 digital audio player, the Eiger Labs MPMan F10, was introduced. In January of that same year at the BeOS Developer Conference, N2IT demonstrated FinalScratch, the first digital DJ system to allow DJs control of MP3 files through special time-coded vinyl records or CDs. While it would take some time for this novel concept to catch on with the "die-hard Vinyl DJs", this would become the first step in the Digital DJ revolution. Manufacturers joined with computer DJing pioneers to offer professional endorsements, the first being Professor Jam (a.k.a. William P. Rader), who went on to develop the industry's first dedicated computer DJ convention and learning program, the "CPS (Computerized Performance System) DJ Summit", to help spread the word about the advantages of this emerging technology.

The late 1980s saw the arrival of acid house and techno from the US, which found fertile ground in West Germany. Frankfurt became an early hub, with clubs like Dorian Gray and Omen, where DJ Sven Väth helped pioneer the techno scene and cultivated a new, long-form style of DJ-led partying.

A pivotal moment occurred with the fall of the Berlin Wall in 1989. This created a unique cultural and legal vacuum in the city's center, particularly in the former East, where abandoned factories, bunkers, and power plants were repurposed into legendary techno clubs. Clubs like Tresor, Bunker, and E-Werk became the crucibles for a new form of DJ culture. In this scene, the DJ acted less as an entertainer and more as a "shaman" leading the crowd on extended sonic journeys, often in venues with no set closing times.

This movement was epitomized by the Love Parade, an event started by DJ Dr. Motte in 1989 as a small demonstration for "Peace, Joy, and Pancakes" (Friede, Freude, Eierkuchen) with 150 people. It grew into a massive festival, drawing an estimated 1.5 million attendees at its peak in 1999. Figures like Westbam also helped define this "Raving Society" with large-scale events like Mayday.

Germany also played a central role in the technology of modern DJing. The MP3 audio compression format was developed primarily at the Fraunhofer-Institut. Furthermore, Berlin-based companies became global standards in the digital DJing era: Native Instruments with its Traktor software, and Ableton with its Live software, which blurred the lines between DJing and live production. In the 21st century, clubs like Berghain became world-famous for fostering an anti-star ethos, where resident DJs (such as Ben Klock and Marcel Dettmann) play long, hypnotic sets, solidifying Berlin's status as a global capital for techno.

In 1991, the British magazine DJ Magazine began publishing annual rankings of DJs, which later evolved into the well-known DJ Mag Top 100 DJs poll. Initially selected by the magazine's journalists, the list expanded in 1993 into a Top 100 ranking created to celebrate the magazine's 100th issue. In 1997, the poll transitioned to a public vote, allowing readers worldwide to participate in selecting the world's most popular DJs.

In 2001, Pioneer DJ began producing the CDJ-1000 CD player, making the use of digital music recordings with traditional DJ techniques practical for the first time. As the 2000s progressed, laptop computers became more powerful and affordable. DJ software, specialized DJ sound cards, and DJ controllers were developed for DJs to use laptops as a source of music rather than turntables or CDJs. In the 2010s, like laptops before them, tablet computers and smartphones became more powerful & affordable. DJ software was written to run on these more portable devices instead of laptops, although laptops remain the more common type of computer for DJing.

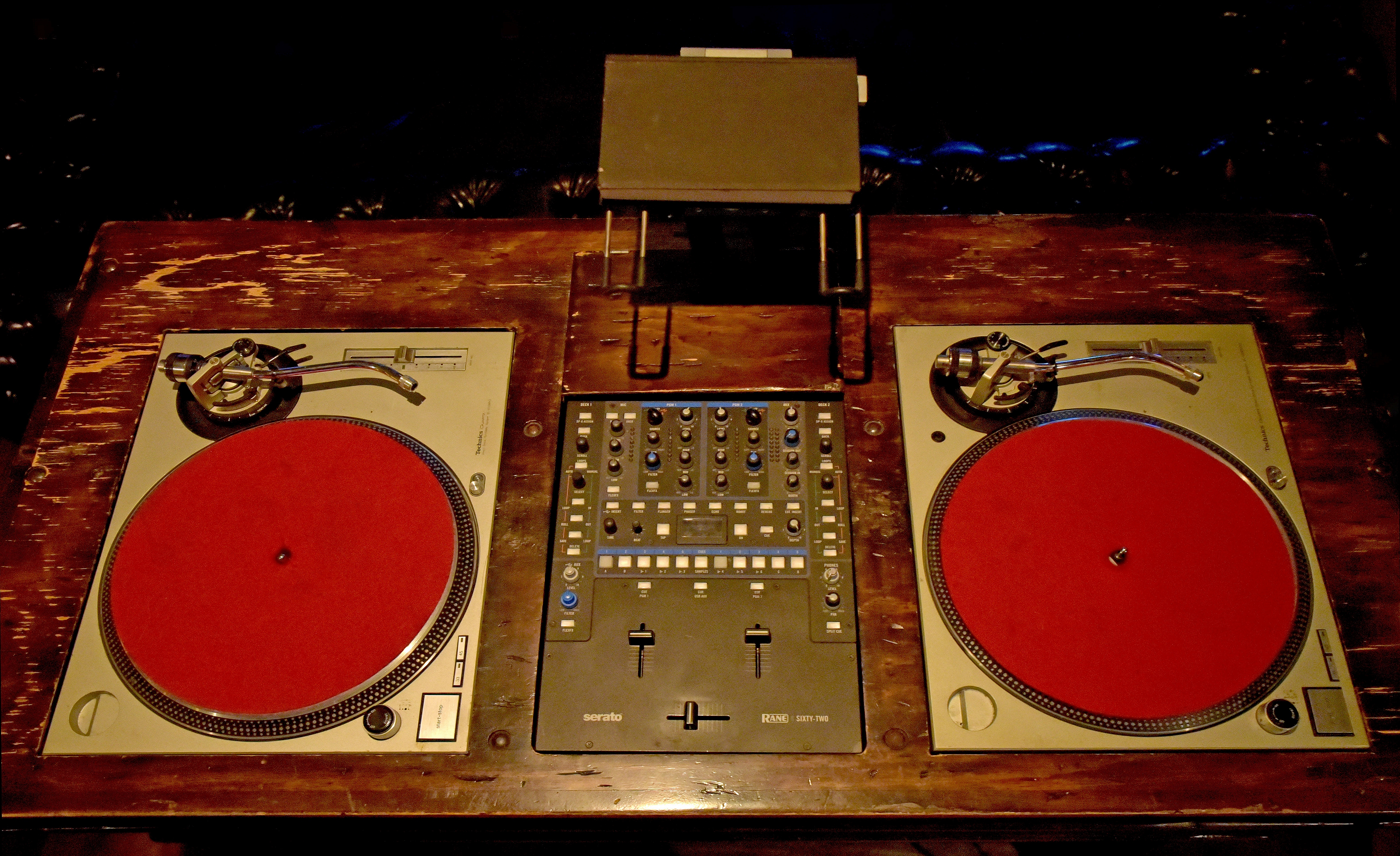
Analog and digital 2010s DJ station. A Rane Sixty-Two DJ mixer is placed between two Technics SL-1200 turntables with a laptop.

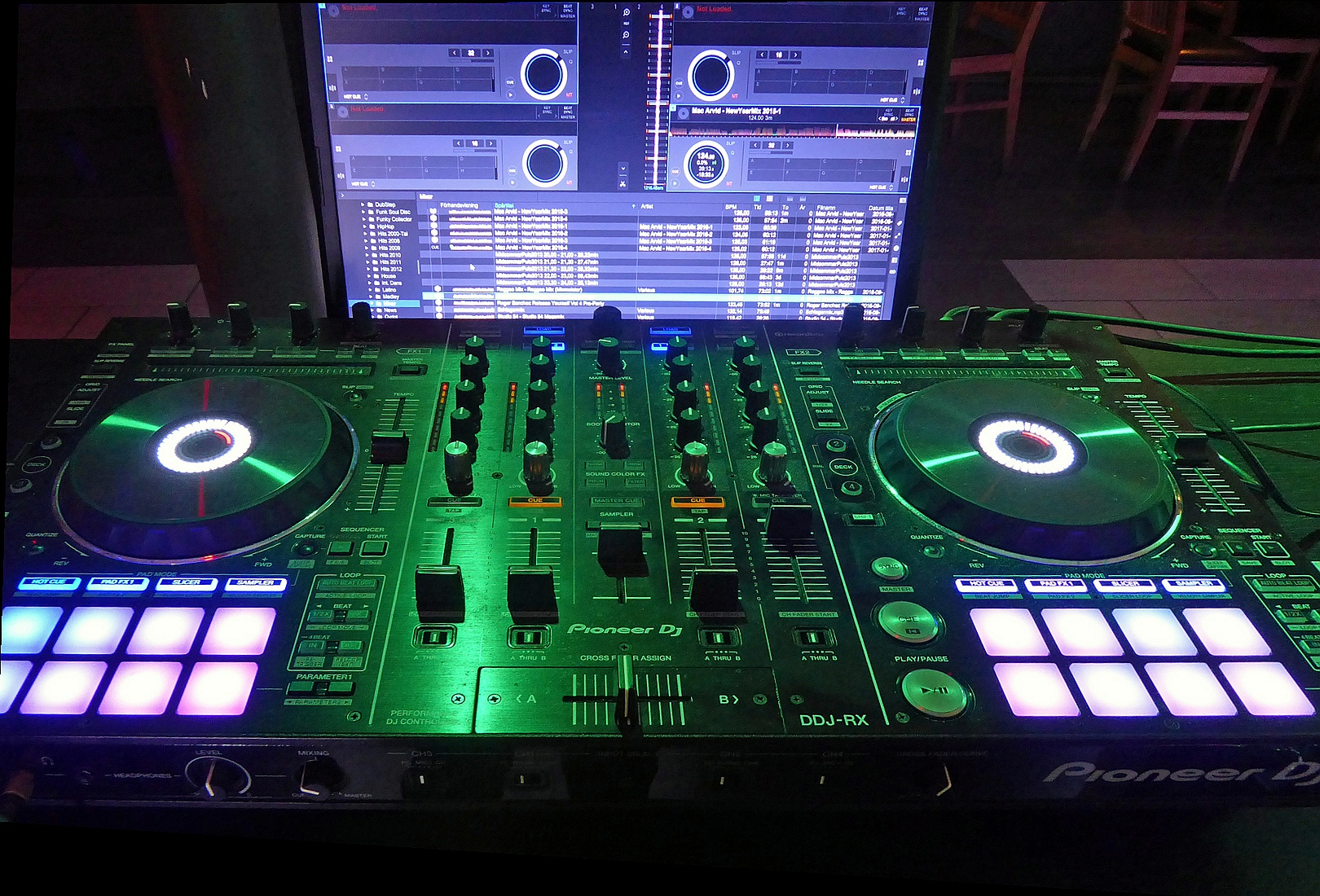
Pioneer DDJ-RX controller with the mixing software rekordbox running on a computer. The physical setup (two "discs" as primary tools, mixing controls mainly in the middle) of this digital DJ workplace strongly resembles the style of the old analog DJ set above, as the latter was standard and "best practice".

== Health concerns ==
The risk of DJs working in nightclubs with loud music includes noise-induced hearing loss and tinnitus. Nightclubs constantly exceed safe levels of noise exposure with average sound levels ranging from 93.2 to 109.7 dB. Constant music exposure creates temporary and permanent auditory dysfunction for professional DJs with average levels at 96 dB being above the recommended level, at which ear protection is mandatory for industry. Three-quarters of DJs have tinnitus and are at risk of tenosynovitis in the wrists and other limbs. Tenosynovitis results from staying in the same position over multiple gigs for scratching motion and cueing, this would be related to a repetitive strain injury. Gigs can last 4–5 hours in the nightlife and hospitality industry, as a result, there are potential complications of prolonged standing which include slouching, varicose veins, cardiovascular disorders, joint compression, and muscle fatigue. This is common for other staff to experience as well including bartenders and security staff for example.

== See also ==
- Digital DJ licensing
- List of club DJs
- List of music software#DJ software
- Live PA
- DJ mix
- Record collecting
- Spelling of disc
- Stage lighting
- VJ (media personality)

== Notes ==
- Assef, Claudia (2000). Todo DJ Já Sambou: A História do Disc-Jóquei no Brasil. São Paulo: Conrad Editora do Brasil. ISBN 85-87193-94-5.
- Brewster, Bill, and Frank Broughton (2000). Last Night a DJ Saved My Life: The History of the Disc Jockey. New York: Grove Press. ISBN 0-8021-3688-5 (North American edition). London: Headline. ISBN 0-7472-6230-6 (UK edition).
- Broughton, Frank, and Bill Brewster. How to DJ Right: The Art and Science of Playing Records. New York: Grove Press, 2003.
- Graudins, Charles A. How to Be a DJ. Boston: Course Technology PTR, 2004.
- Lawrence, Tim (2004). Love Saves the Day: A History of American Dance Music Culture, 1970–1979 . Duke University Press. ISBN 0-8223-3198-5.
- Miller, Paul D. a.k.a. DJ Spooky, Sound Unbound: Writings on DJ Culture and Electronic Music, MIT Press 2008. ISBN 0-262-63363-9 ISBN 978-0-262-63363-5.
- Poschardt, Ulf (1998). DJ Culture. London: Quartet Books. ISBN 0-7043-8098-6.
- Zemon, Stacy. The Mobile DJ Handbook: How to Start & Run a Profitable Mobile Disc Jockey Service, Second Edition. St. Louis: Focal Press, 2002.
