= Cue (audio) =

Act of determining starting point for audio

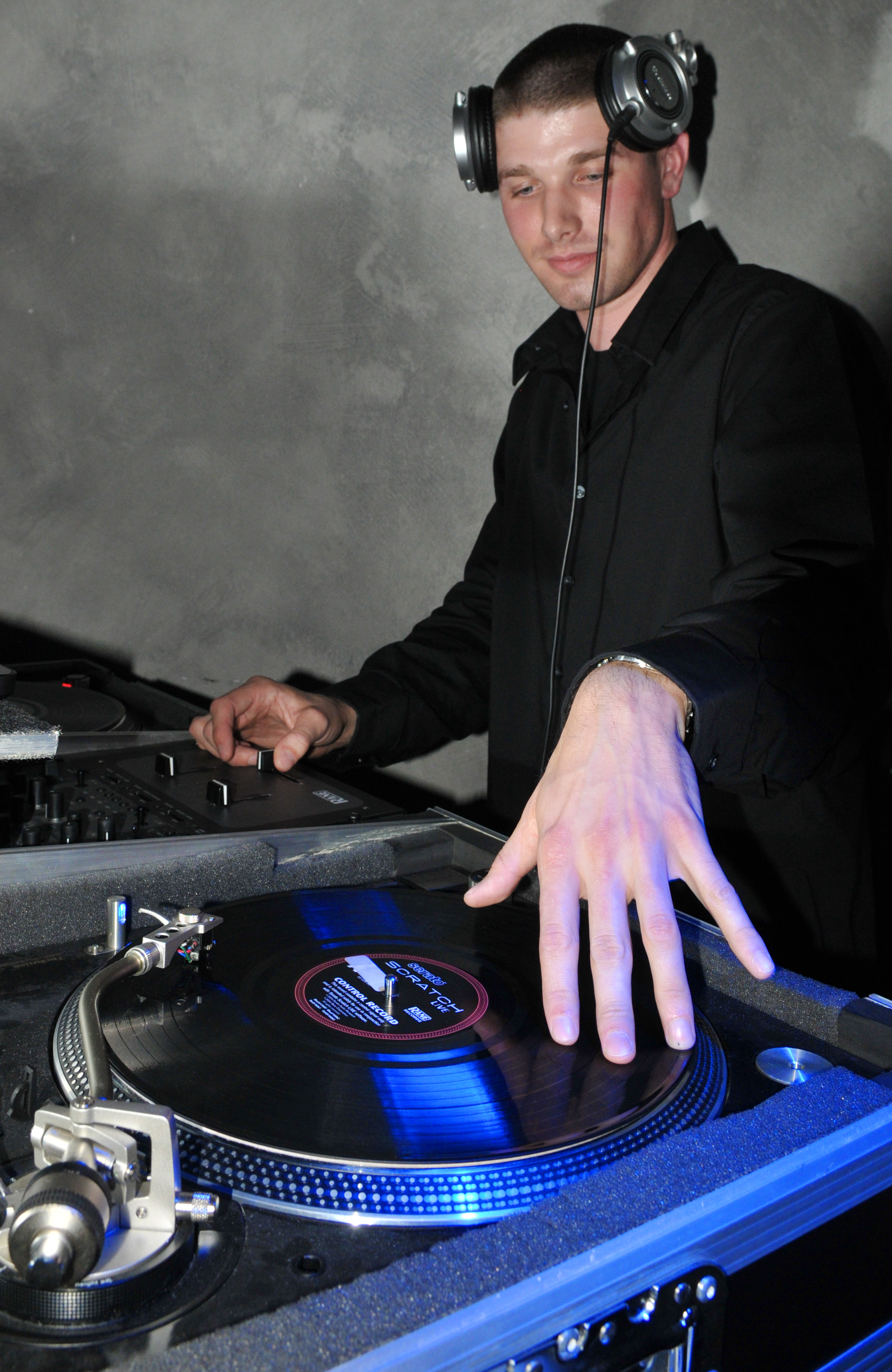
A DJ cues up a record track

To cue audio is to determine the desired initial playback point in a piece of recorded music. It is a technique often used in radio broadcasting and DJing. One dictionary definition is to "Set a piece of audio or video equipment in readiness to play (a particular part of the recorded material)."

== Process ==
DJs typically find the desired start place on a record, tape, CD, or other media by listening to the recording with headphones and manipulating the turntable or other playback controls. Some DJs mark parts of a record with stickers to make it easier to find parts of record tracks.

DJs use headphones to cue up the start point; this means that the audience cannot hear the playback until the DJ wants them to. Once the recording is cued up to the desired start point, the DJ can then commence the playback of the recording at the desired moment. The goal of cueing is to avoid "dead air", that is, silence.

== Slip cue ==
A subtype of cueing is slip-cueing. To slip cue a record, there has to be a felt mat under the record. The DJ finds the desired start point and then leaves the stylus at the start point while holding the side of the record, with the turntable spinning. The DJ can then release the record and the music will start immediately.
