= Needle drop (DJing) =

Deejaying technique

The needle drop is a technique used in hip-hop deejaying. The DJ sets a record spinning, then drops the stylus on the turntable at the exact point where they want playback to begin without previously cueing up the record. Since there is no time wasted in cuing, the needle drop allows faster movements by the DJ. The needle drop method was developed in the 1970s by Grand Wizzard Theodore at around the same time that he and Grandmaster Flash were pioneering scratching.

== Sticker method ==
In the sticker method of locating the sample or break, a DJ uses a colored "dot" label to mark the sample to be used. Marking a record involves several steps. The first step is to locate the desired sample. The second step is much more critical; the sample is located, then the record is brought about an inch or two backwards from the beginning of the sample. The dot is carefully placed up against the stylus (needle) and a feather touch is applied to keep the label in place. Too hard of an application may lead to the needle being misplaced on the record, slipping to the next several grooves, an undesired result. After the needle is removed from the dot, the label can be pressed into place more permanently. If the DJ ever wishes to remove the dot, residue can be removed from the record with a record cleaner solution.

== See also ==
- Slip-cueing
