= Scotch Club =

Coordinates: 50.7758°N 6.08816°E

The Scotch Club in Aachen was one of the first discothèques in Germany, opening on 19 October 1959. It was closed in 1992.

== Origin of the discothèque ==
On Monday 19 October 1959, the former restaurant The Scotch Club in Aachen, North Rhine Westphalia, re-opened as a dance hall, but the owner did not want to hire a band and used a record player instead. Klaus Quirini, a volunteer newspaper journalist reporting on the event, was as bored as most of the visitors and took over the record player. He used the style common with many radio news reporters, announcing songs and audience games and giving comments. The first song he played was the chart hit Ein Schiff wird kommen by Lale Andersen. His first announcement wording (translation): "Ladies and gentlemen, we roll up our trouser legs and let water into the hall because a ship is coming with Lale Andersen". This style become popular, and he remained the disc-jockey, one of the earliest credited DJs, for eight years. As DJ Heinrich, he organised other DJs to found a workers' union that made DJ an official (i.e. healthcare registered) profession.

== Later development ==
Udo Jürgens, Peter Maffay, the Rattles and Giorgio Moroder began their careers in the Scotch Club. The dress code was strict and bouncers refused entrance to men not wearing a tie, even celebrities such as television presenter Frank Elstner and singer Udo Lindenberg.

The club closed in 1992. Following the opening of the Scotch Club in late 1959, other discothèques opened throughout Aachen and in other major towns. When the first club opened in the US, there were already 17 discos in Aachen.
