= Slip-cueing =

DJ technique

Slip-cueing is a DJ technique for cueing music with turntables. The DJ holds a record still while the platter rotates underneath the slipmat and releases it at the right moment. In this way the record attains the right speed almost immediately, with no need to wait for the heavy platter to accelerate.

The Slip-cue technique had been used for many years in the radio broadcast industry; it was often used by radio stations to match a following song to the preceding song, preserving the beat.

== See also ==
- Cue (audio)
- Needle drop (DJing)
- Beatmatching

== Sources ==
- Jones, Alan and Kantonen, Jussi (1999). Saturday Night Forever: The Story of Disco. Chicago, Illinois: A Cappella Books. ISBN 1-55652-411-0.
- Goldman, Albert, (1978). Disco. New York, New York: Hawthorn Books. ISBN 0-8015-2128-9.
