= Slipmat =

DJ equipment

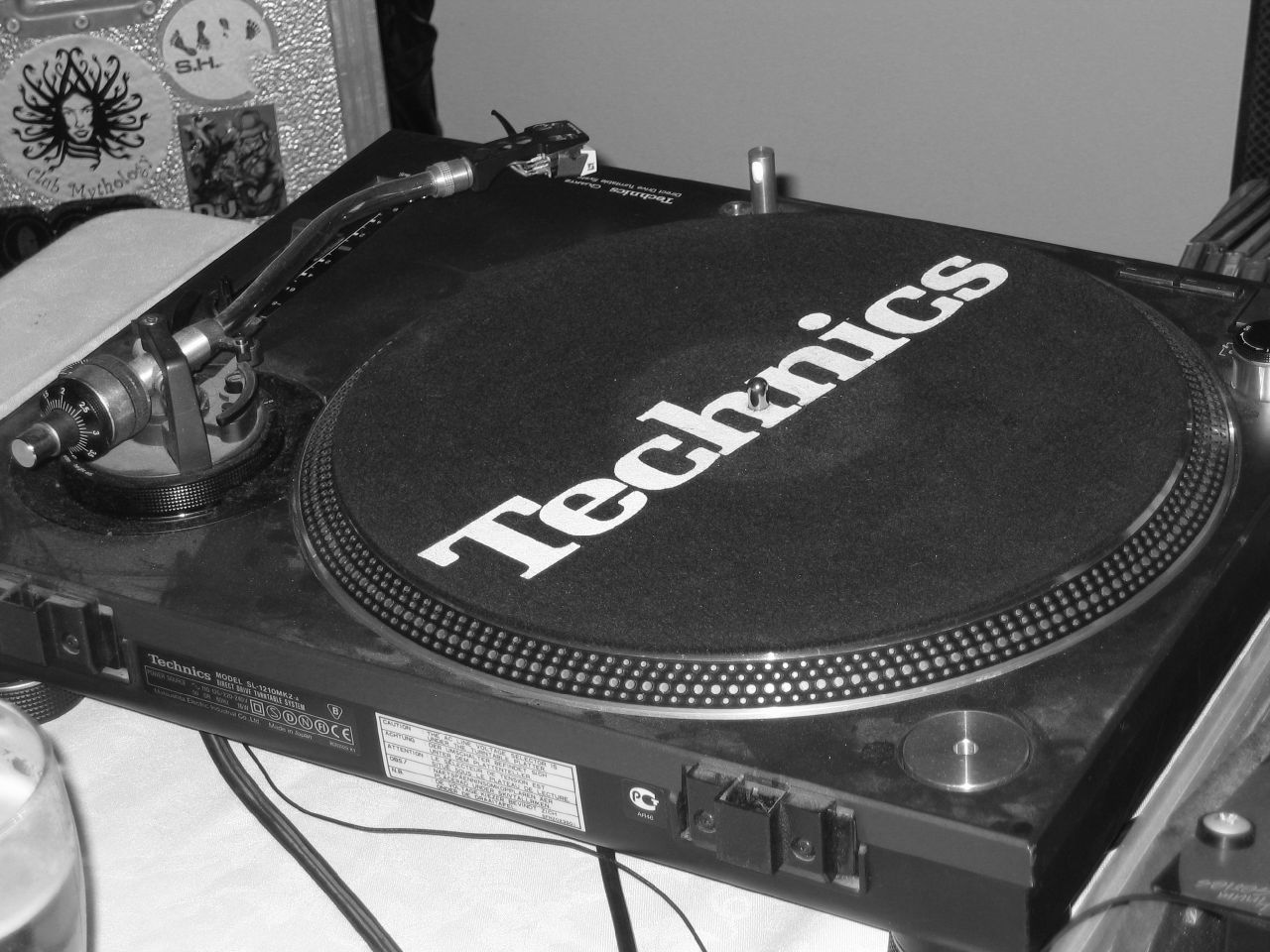
A slipmat on Technics SL-1200 turntable

A slipmat is a circular piece of slippery cloth or synthetic materials disk jockeys place on the turntable platter instead of the traditional rubber mat.

Unlike the rubber mat which is made to hold the record firmly in sync with the rotating platter, slipmats are designed to slip on the platter, allowing the DJ to manipulate a record on a turntable while the platter continues to rotate underneath. This is useful for holding a record still for slip-cueing, making minute adjustments during beatmatching and mixing and pulling the record back and forth for scratching. They are also very commonly used simply as decoration for when a record isn't on the turntable.

The slipmat was invented by hip-hop pioneer Grandmaster Flash to improve its sound and move the vinyl counterclockwise without causing too much drag and too much friction. In a Washington Post interview, he recalls "My mother was a seamstress so I knew different types of materials," he continues. Having settled on felt, Flash encountered another issue. "The problem with felt is that it draped, it was limp," he recalls. "So I ran home and got a copy of my album and I bought just enough felt to cut out two round circles the same size as a 33’ LP and—when my mother wasn't looking—I turned the iron all the way up high and I used my mother's spray starch. I sprayed it until this limp piece of felt became—I called it a wafer, like what you get in church at Easter. Today it's called a slipmat."
