= Phrase (disambiguation) =

A phrase is a group of words that functions as a single constituent in a sentence.

Phrase may also refer to:

- Phrase (music), a unit of musical meter
- Phrase (fencing), a sequence of actions in fencing
- Phrase (rapper) (born 1981), Australian rapper
- Phrase (software), translation management system for software
