= Phrasing (DJ) =

In DJing, phrasing, also known as stage matching, refers to alignment of phrases of two tracks in a mix. This allows the transition between the tracks to be done without breaking the musical structure.

Phrasing is an aspect of beatmatching, not a separate technique. Because most music has a 4/4 time signature and a simple structure of 16-bar phrases, to align the phrases of two tracks it is often enough to start the track to be mixed in at a phrase boundary in the track currently playing. Careful phrasing can produce a seamless mix by making the breaks in two tracks coincide, or aligning the break in one track with the start of the beat in the other.

== See also ==
- Segue
