= John A. Westlake =

British-Czech Hi Fi designer (born 1970)

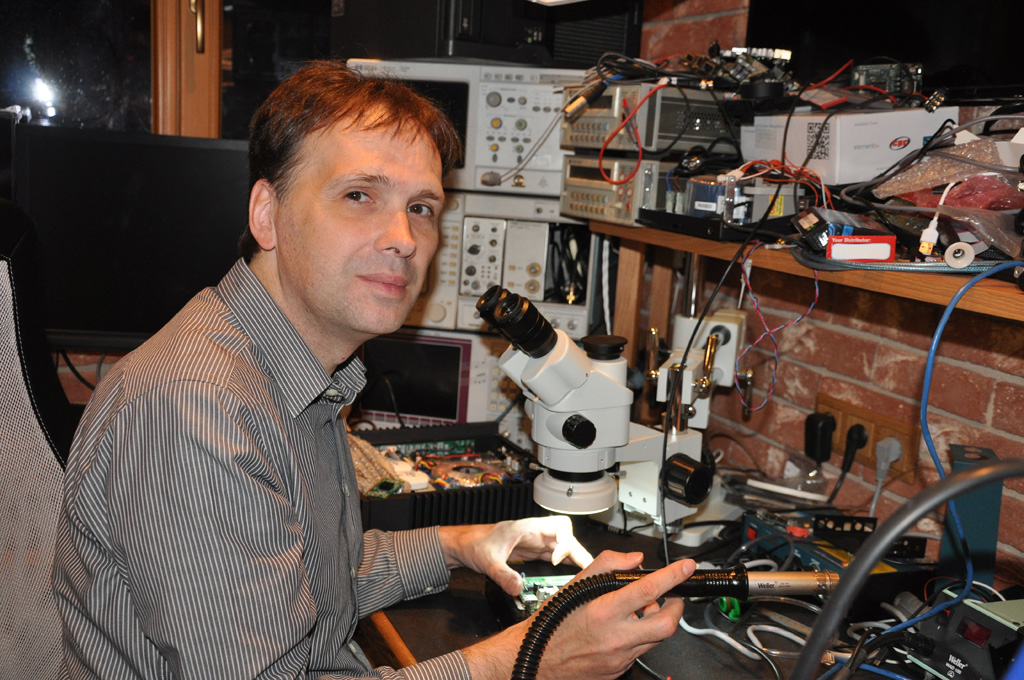
- Born: July 1970 (age 55)
- Occupation: Hi Fi designer

John Alexander Westlake (born July 1970) is a British-Czech Hi Fi designer.

== Early life and education ==
John Westlake is a son of a Czech mother and a British father. He was born in London but spent his early years in Czechoslovakia. His father was a physicist at the Imperial College in London. He is a self taught Hi Fi designer who didn't receive a formal university education and learnt electronics by observing his father's work.

== Career ==
John Westlake started his Hi Fi career in his early twenties while working for a Hi Fi company Pink Triangle. He designed the Pink Triangle DaCapo digital to analog converter in 1991. He then moved on to working for Cambridge Audio, designing many of their award winning products - Cambridge Audio DACMagic digital to analog converter, CD4, CD4SE, CD6, DAC 123, ISO Magic etc.

He has also been working with semiconductor companies that patent some of his technologies: UK patent on Feedback controller for PWM amplifier, International patent on a signal processing circuit. John Westlake is known for his work on Class D amplifier technology.

In 2008, after years of research and working for semiconductor companies, he started his own company - Lakewest Audio & returned to designing Hi Fi products. He is the designer behind the Peachtree Audio Nova D/A integrated amplifier that was voted a Budget Product of the Year 2009 by Stereophile magazine. Peachtree Audio Decco2 integrated amplifier & the Peachtree Audio iDAC – Tube Hybrid Integrated Amp with "Pure Digital" iPod Dock - voted Stereophile's Products of 2011. His designs also include the Audiolab 8200 CD player – an award winning Best Product of the Year 2010 and Best Product of the Year 2011 by What HiFi Sound & Vision magazine.

This was followed by the Audiolab 8200CDQ – an all in one CD player, DAC and pre-amplifier. His most successful addition to the Audiolab product line was the original M-DAC, a standalone D/A converter. M-DAC held What HiFi Sound & Vision magazine award for 4 years consecutive years and became a European Imaging and Sound Association (EISA) European Product of the Year 2012-2013.

His latest cooperation involved Pro-Ject PreBox S2 Digital - DAC/Headphone amplifier, European Imaging and Sound Association (EISA) European Product of the Year 2017-2018, Pro-Ject DAC Box S2+ and Pro-Ject StreamBox S2 Ultra.

He is currently semi-retired.

== Crowdfunding Projects and Controversies ==
John has proposed several Crowdfunded Development Projects utilising his Electronic Design experience. These started in 2013 on the audio discussion forum pinkfishmedia.net with the MDAC2 proposal and was followed by a VFET Amplifier, DETOX USB signal adapter and MDAC2 Streamer. The proposal for these projects was a development period of months with investors rewarded with completed design PCBs and products produced at cost. In total over £100,000 has been raised to fund the developments. Apart from a limited number of MDAC2 Streamer Boards, no project has produced a completed design and offered to investors.

Planned months of project development have subsequently turned into years with numerous planned completion deadlines failing to be realised. Instead of focussing on achievable design goals, John has allowed projects to run-off on tangents chasing new technology and ultimate performance. John refuses to accept offers of help for Project Management and maintains a self-control development model. Consequently, investor concerns and frustrations have grown and many have spoken out against John over the timescales and his project development methods. Because of these criticisms, John now mainly only discusses the crowdfunded projects on a private Closed Facebook Group page under his control.

== MDAC2 DAC Project ==
In 2013, John Westlake used the audio discussion forum pinkfishmedia.net to offer the development of an upgraded MDAC mainboard to project investors. Investors would support the development with stage funding of £400-£600 and be offered the upgraded DAC mainboard on an "at cost" production basis. The original development was to be months, with delivery in 2013. Under John Westlake, the project then went off on several design tangents and morphed into other projects like the FDAC with a new chassis proposal. To date, no MDAC2 board or product had been finalised or produced for offer to the MDAC2 project investors. Together with the VFET Amplifier and DETOX Projects, John Westlake has taken over £100,000 from investors and delivered no projects.

Originally, upon design completion, production was to be sourced from China utilising Johns manufacturing supply chain contacts. Then there were concerns over quality from China and Europe was planned. Finally, John, with the help of further investor payments, set up a production facility in his lab in the Czech Republic. This setup was supposed to be the final solution to PCB production issues.

Due to a lack of progress and the timescales taken on the project, investors concerns grew and many spoke out on the pinkfishmedia.net MDAC2 threads. John, used this as his platform to launch the project and was highly involved in the discussions. However, as time went on, John's promises of delivery came and went and criticisms grew from investors frustrations. John now only uses a closed Facebook Group page under his control to discuss the MDAC2 project.

Some investors feel that John has used the MDAC2 project funding to kit out his lab and develop projects sold to manufacturers such as the Project Stream Box S2 Ultra. That incorporates many design features which were to be included in the MDAC2. Because of the timescales, broken promises and lack of progress, many MDAC2 investors have written-off their investment funding.

== MDAC2 Streamer Board Project ==
The MDAC2 Streamer Board is a music streamer John Westlake offered to investors in order to fund and build an in-house PCB production facility at his lab in the Czech Republic. This was supposed to allow the production of the MDAC2 DAC PCB Boards in-house under John's quality control. Some MDAC2 Streamer Boards were produced, but some investors didn't get a product as John then proposed to incorporate the streamer board into the forthcoming main MDAC2 board.

== VFET Amplifier Project ==
The VFET Amplifier is a similar investor backed project to the MDAC2 development which started in 2014 with delivery planned for late that year. The VFET was to be developed from the Audiolab 8000MB Monoblock amplifiers. John supposedly bought sufficient 8000MB chassis to fulfil the project investors orders at over £3,000 per pair, paid upfront. To date, no VFET amplifier completed design has been shown, nor have any amplifiers been produced.

== DETOX USB Project ==
The 2015 USB Detox was to be a device to detox the USB signal fed to DACs. As with the MDAC2 and VFET Projects, John offered these on a development investor basis of £50 with an at cost production anticipated to be around £130 In 2016, a prototype was produced and reported to be working, but the project was then dropped by John in 2018 because it was to be incorporated directly into the MDAC2 project design.

== Patents ==
- UK Patent 65135GB on "Feedback Controller for PWM Amplifier"
- United States of America Patent 7046080 on "A Signal Processing Circuit"

== Designs ==
Brand	Product name	Awards
Pink Triangle	Dacapo	
Pink Triangle	DC	
Pink Triangle	Ordinal	
Pink Triangle	Cardinal	
Pink Triangle	PIPII Battery PSU	
Pink Triangle	Anniversy Battery PSU	
Cambridge Audio	DACMagic MK1,2 & 3	
Cambridge Audio	CD4	
Cambridge Audio	CD4SE	
Cambridge Audio	CD6	
Cambridge Audio	IsoMagic	
Audio Innovations	Alto CD player	
Audio Innovations	TubeTechnology Fusion	
KV2	DSD based Delaylines	
Quad Electroacoustics	Elite FM	
Quad Electroacoustics	Artera (Streamer Section)	
Quad Electroacoustics	Solo (Streamer Section)	
Peachtree Audio	Nova	Stereophile's Products of 2009
Peachtree Audio	iDecco	Stereophile's Products of 2011
Peachtree Audio	iNova	
Peachtree Audio	iDac	Stereophile's Products of 2011 JOINT BUDGET COMPONENTS OF THE YEAR
Warwick	BC20 Bass Amp designed with Jonas Hellborg	
Warwick	BC40 Bass Amp designed with Jonas Hellborg	
Warwick	BC80 Bass Amp designed with Jonas Hellborg	
Warwick	BC150 Bass Amp designed with Jonas Hellborg	
Audiolab	8200CD	2010: What Hi-Fi? Sound and Vision - 5 Star Award; 2010: What Hi-Fi? Sound and Vision - Product of The Year - CD player; 2010: What Hi-Fi? Sound and Vision - Group Test Winner; 2010: Hi Fi Choice - Recommended Award and 5 stars; 2010: TechRadar; 2011: Hi Fi Choice - 5-Star Award - Best CD Player up to £1,000; 2012: BBC Music Magazine - 5 Star and product of year; 2012: What Hi-Fi? Sound and Vision - 5-Star Award; 2013: Hi-Fi Choice Group test winner
Audiolab	8200CDQ	2011: What Hi-Fi? Sound and Vision - 5-Star Award(first tests); 2011: Hi-Fi World - 5-Globe Award; 2011: Hi-Fi Choice - Recommended Award - Best CD Player up to £1,000; 2012: Hi-Fi Choice 5 star Award
Audiolab	8200DQ	
Audiolab	MDAC	2011: What Hi-Fi? Sound And Vision - Product Of The Year; 2011: What Hi-Fi? Sound And Vision - 5 Star Award; 2012: Hi-Fi Choice - 5 Star Award; 2012: Hi-Fi Choice - Editors Choice; 2012: What Hi-Fi? Sound And Vision - Best Digital Headphone Amp; 2012: Hi-Fi News - Outstanding Product; 2012: EISA Awards 2012-13 - European D/A Converter; 2013: Hi-Fi Choice - Group Test Winner; 2013: Hi-Fi Choice - 5 Globe Award; 2013: What Hi-Fi? Sound And Vision - Product of the Year - Best DAC £500-£700.; 2014: What Hi-Fi? Sound And Vision - Product of the Year - Best DAC £500 - £700; 2015: What Hi-Fi? Sound And Vision - 5* Recommended Laptop System (with Grado SR325E / Macbook Air)
Creek Audio	EVOLUTION 100CD (CD Servo, front panel, FM Tuner section)	Diapason d'Or
Pro-Ject	PreBox S2 Digital	2017: EISA Awards - Best Product - EISA DAC/HEADPHONE AMPLIFIER 2017-2018; 2018: Stereoplay Test - Outstanding Performance
Pro-Ject	HeadBox S2	
Pro-Ject	DAC Box S2+	
Pro-Ject	StreamBox S2 Ultra	2018: EISA AWARDS - Best Product - EISA STREAMER 2018-2019
