= John Westlake =

John Westlake may refer to:

- John Westlake (law scholar), English law scholar
- John A. Westlake, British–Czech hi-fi designer
