= Audiolab =

British manufacturer of audio equipment

- Company type: Private
- Industry: Electronics
- Founded: 1983; 43 years ago
- Founder: Phillip Swift
- Headquarters: United Kingdom, UK
- Area served: Worldwide
- Key people: Bernard Chang, Michael Chang
- Products: HiFi Systems; CD Players; DVD Players
- Owner: Phillip Swift (1983-1998); McLaren Technology Group (1998-2004); International Audio Group (2004-present)
- Website: www.audiolab.co.uk

Audiolab is a British manufacturer of audio equipment. It specializes in affordable systems and has a range of stereo and surround sound systems. During its ownership under McLaren Group it was named TAGMcLaren Audio.

== History ==
Audiolab was founded by Philip Swift and Derek Scotland in 1983. They met as students of Imperial College, and shared a common frustration of the high cost of hi-fi equipment and the difficulty of use. The first product was the 8000A integrated amplifier, followed by the 8000C preamplifier, the 8000P power amplifier and 8000M mono-blocks. As the company grew, they developed new products including CD players, transports, radio tuners and digital-to-analog converters.

Audiolab was taken over by TAG McLaren in 1998. The TAG McLaren Audio enterprise suffered adversely from the economic slump in the early 2000s, and announced that it ceased development in mid-2003 followed by a strategic review. The audio operations were eventually sold to the International Audio Group (headquartered in Shenzhen, China), which owns other Hi-Fi manufacturers such as Quad, Mission, Wharfedale and Castle Acoustics. In 2005 Audiolab re-emerged with a whole new range of equipment.

In 2010, Audiolab unveiled a range of audio components that have been badged the 8200 series, as opposed to the traditional 8000 series. In addition to adding a larger monoblock amplifier, the 8200MB, the digital components also accept digital input from computers and other digital sources. The new 8200 series digital products have been designed by John Westlake, aside from the 8200 AV.

The 8300 series was introduced in 2015 (including the integrated amplifier 8300A, the CD player 8300CD, and the power amplifiers 8300MB and 8300XP).

A cheaper 6000 series (designed by Danish designer Jan Ertner) was launched in 2017.

Audiolab was sold as Camtech in Germany and the Netherlands.

== Awards ==
Audiolab 8200CD player designed by John Westlake - Product of the Year 2010 by What Hi-Fi? Sound and Vision magazine.

The Audiolab 8200CD won the same Product of the year award for CD players from What Hi*Fi? Sound and Vision in 2011 and 2012.

The Audiolab MDAC won Product of the Year for DACs (Digital to analogue converters) in the same 2011 What Hi*Fi? Sound and Vision awards.
