= Epos Ltd =

- Company type: Private
- Industry: Consumer electronics
- Founded: 1983
- Headquarters: Hemel Hempstead, Britain
- Products: Hi-Fi and Home cinema Loudspeakers
- Website: Epos

Epos Ltd is a British loudspeaker company that specialises in home cinema and hi-fi speakers.

== History ==
Epos was founded in 1983 by Robin Marshall. In 1988 Epos was sold to Mordaunt-Short who had been bought by the TGI PLC group in 1987. When the TGI PLC group decided to close the Epos/Mordaunt-Short operations in 1999, the Epos part was sold to Michael Creek, the owner and managing director of Creek Audio Ltd.

In 2020 Creek sold the Epos operation to Karl-Heinz Fink, founder of German speaker designer firm FinkTeam.

== Products ==
Current Epos speakers are split into two ranges, the budget ELS series and the high end Mi series.
