= Creek Audio =

British hi-fi company

Creek Audio is a manufacturer of audio equipment.

== History ==
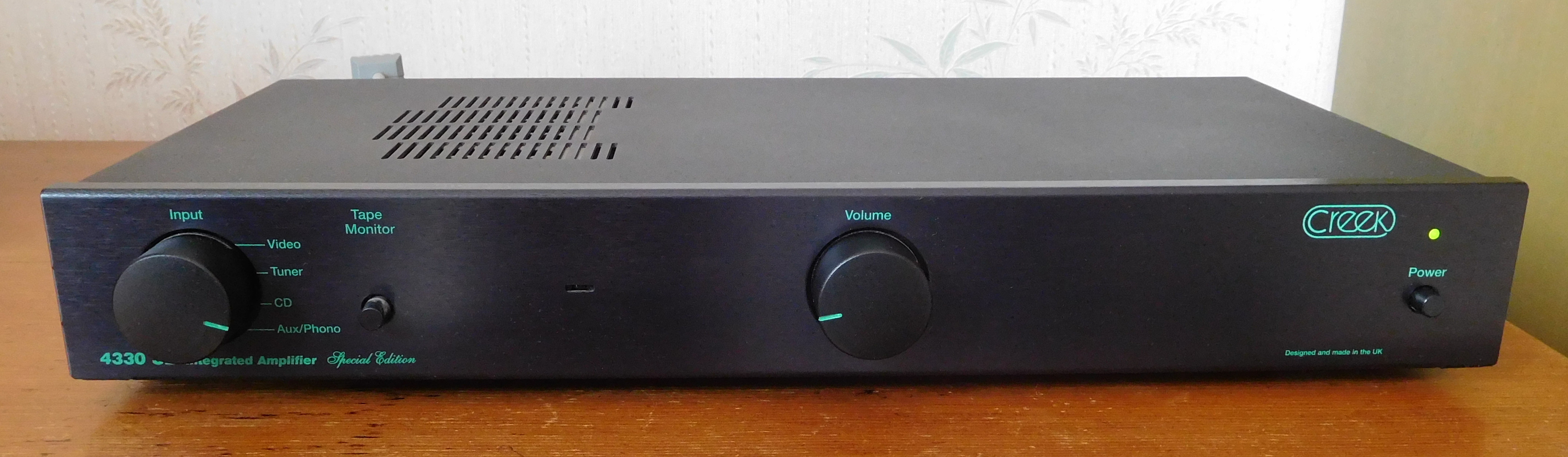
Creek 4330 SE integrated amplifier.

Creek Audio production was started in 1982 by Michael Creek. Initially, Creek manufactured integrated amplifiers and tuners from its London base.

Sales of Creek products increased at a large rate, until new premises were required. Many overseas markets were established together with about 80 specialised UK retail customers but delivery times became extended as sales outstripped production. Additional funding was required to grow the company so in 1988 Creek Audio was sold to Mordaunt-Short who had been bought by the TGI PLC group the previous year.

Creek Audio continued to grow but in 1991 Mordaunt-Short's management changed. TGI appointed a new M.D. who jointly managed Tannoy in Scotland and Mordaunt-Short, Creek Audio and Epos Speakers. Production was split between the two companies, which created higher manufacturing costs and led to the company being offered for sale, as it ceased to be profitable.

In 1993 a consortium of Creek's overseas distributors from USA, Switzerland and Germany got together with the founder, Mike Creek, to buy the brand name back from TGI PLC. Mike Creek was appointed Managing Director of the new company called Creek Audio Ltd. It started trading in 1993 from the same premises in north London Creek had originally occupied. Production was continued by a dedicated group of Creek employees who had previously worked at the Mordaunt-Short factory in Horndean, Hampshire.
