= Audio Partnership =

Audio equipment manufacturer

Audio Partnership Plc was founded in 1994 by two businessmen, James Johnson-Flint and Julian Richer, the company is now solely owned by Johnson-Flint. It has its home in London and remains independent. It is a manufacturer of hi-fi, DJ, home cinema and home automation products in China.

== Brands ==
- Cambridge Audio, which produces amplifiers, music streamers, headphones, turntables and wireless speakers.
- Mordaunt Short, a manufacturer of loudspeakers and subwoofers.
- Opus technologies
- Gale Loudspeakers
- Synergy System Technologies Limited

== Products since 1994 ==
Audio Partnership's products since 1994 include stereo amplifiers, CD players, digital-to-analogue (DAC) converters (namely the DACMagic and ISOMagic series), tuners (both analogue and digital), loudspeakers, subwoofers and cables. The company branched out into home cinema, with AV receivers, DVD players, Blu-ray players, soundbars and soundbases.

Most recently, Audio Partnership has concentrated its efforts on the Cambridge brand, with an emphasis on products for music playback, from wireless headphones to high-end hi-fi. In 2011, it developed the proprietary StreamMagic hardware and software platform that is used across the company's range of music streamers, streaming amplifiers and wireless streaming speakers.

== Manufacturer ==
Although the company is based in the UK, its products are manufactured in China to take advantage of lower labour costs.
