= Cambridge Audio =

British hi-fi manufacturer

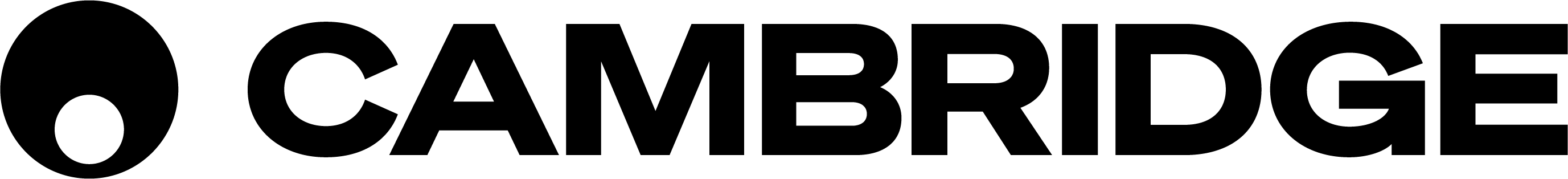
- Type: Private
- Industry: Audio equipment manufacturing
- Founded: 1968
- Headquarters: London, United Kingdom
- Owner: James Johnson-Flint
- Parent: Audio Partnership
- Website: cambridgeaudio.com

Cambridge Audio is a British manufacturer of audio equipment including headphones, audio systems and components.

It was founded in Cambridge, England in the early 1960s as Cambridge Consultants. The company is now independently owned by James Johnson-Flint, and is based in London as a brand of Audio Partnership.

The 2020 to 2021 annual turnover of Audio Partnership was in excess of £33 million.

== Company history ==
=== Origins ===
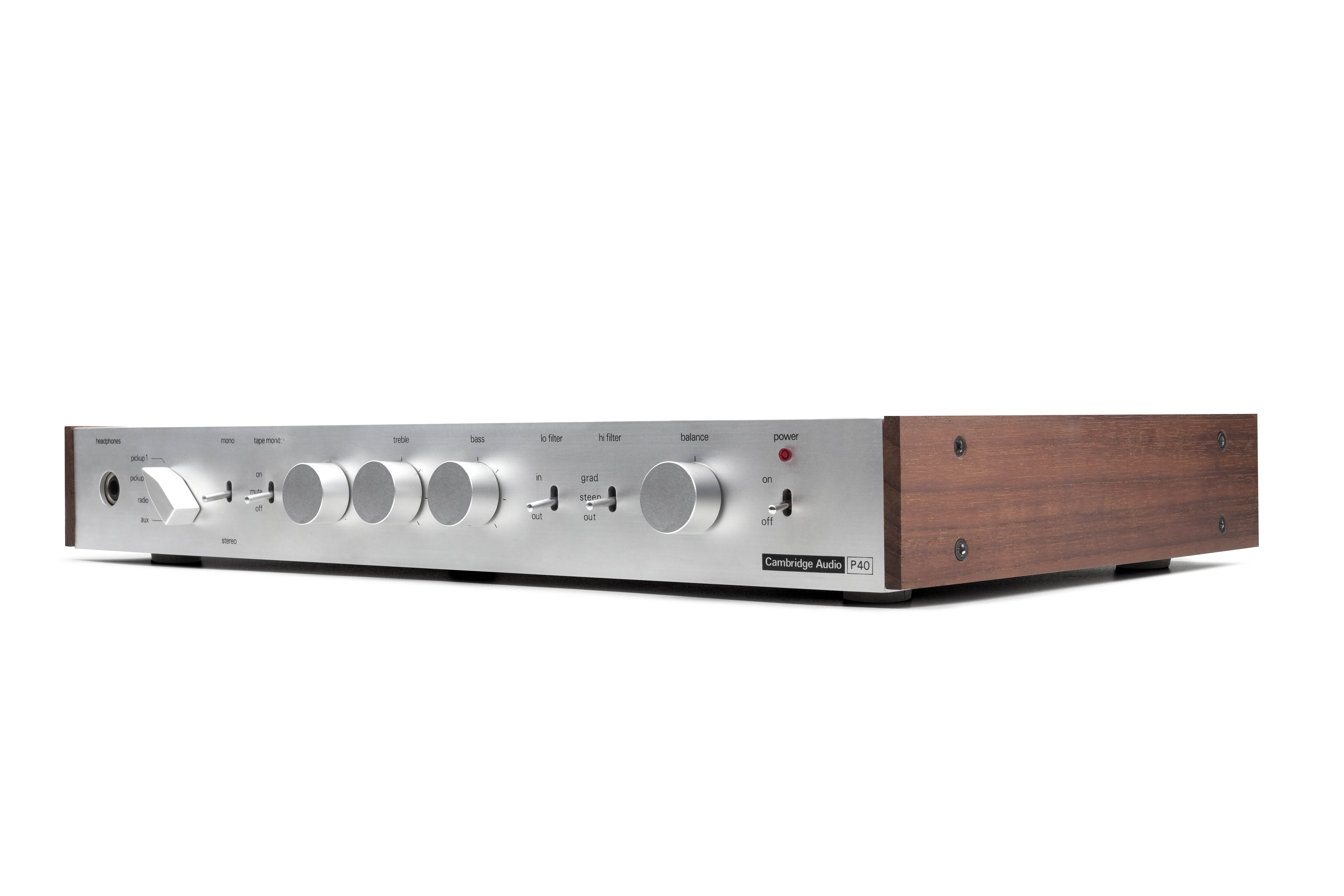
Cambridge Audio P40

Cambridge Audio was founded as a division of Cambridge Consultants in 1968. The company's first product was the 2 × 20W P40 integrated amplifier, which was created by a team that included Gordon Edge and Peter Lee. In addition to an advanced technical specification the P40 had a slim case design by Roy Gray, from Woodhuysen Design.

The P40 would also make history as the first amplifier to use a toroidal transformer, which became a standard component inside high-end amplifiers.

Cambridge Audio became a standalone business from the group when a new company, Cambridge Audio Laboratories Ltd, was formed, operating from the old Enderby's Mill in St. Ives, Cambridge. The P40 was an immediate success, but would prove difficult to manufacture in any volume, a problem that would be resolved in 1970 with the introduction of the new 2 × 25W P50 model, which was a very similar product with regards to both circuit design and appearance, but had been engineered for mass production. Despite strong sales and rapid growth, the company required increased investment and so was sold in 1971 to Colin Hammond of CE Hammond & Co Ltd – then a very successful distributor of Revox tape recorders and other audio products in the UK, Canada and the USA.

A new company, Cambridge Audio Ltd, was formed. The St. Ives at its peak employed more than 300 people. Most of the required components were made in one location.

=== Changing ownership ===
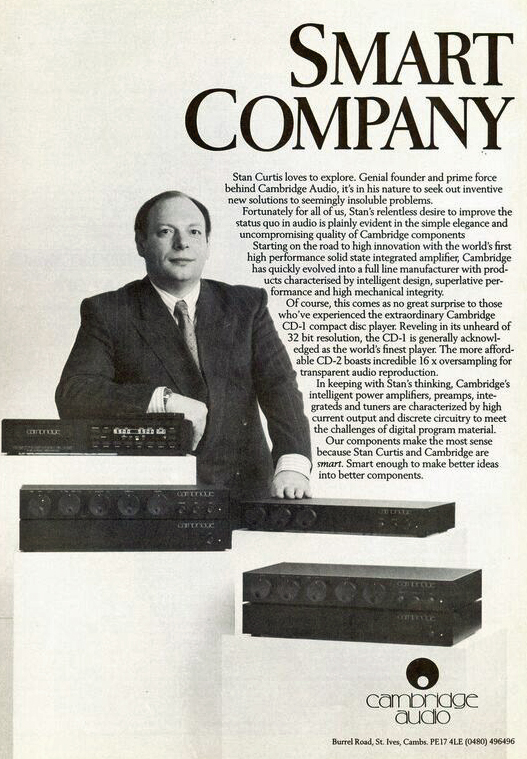
CD1 advert with Stan Curtis

Between the 1980s and 1990s, Cambridge Audio changed owners a few times, with the business sold to UK hi-fi entrepreneur Vince Adams, in 1980, and relaunched as Cambridge Audio Research Ltd. Financial difficulties for the parent company in 1984 led to Cambridge Audio Research being taken over by Stan and Angie Curtis and renamed Cambridge Audio International.

The next four years saw expansion of the business with over 16 new products being launched and with export markets re-established in over 28 countries.

Within two years Cambridge Audio was purchased by the Wharfedale company, best known for its loudspeakers, which set up a production line at its large facility in Leeds, Yorkshire

Wharfedale was undergoing major re-organisation by a team that included Stan Curtis. The decision was made to divest Cambridge Audio and in 1994 the company would be sold.

=== Takeover by Audio Partnership ===
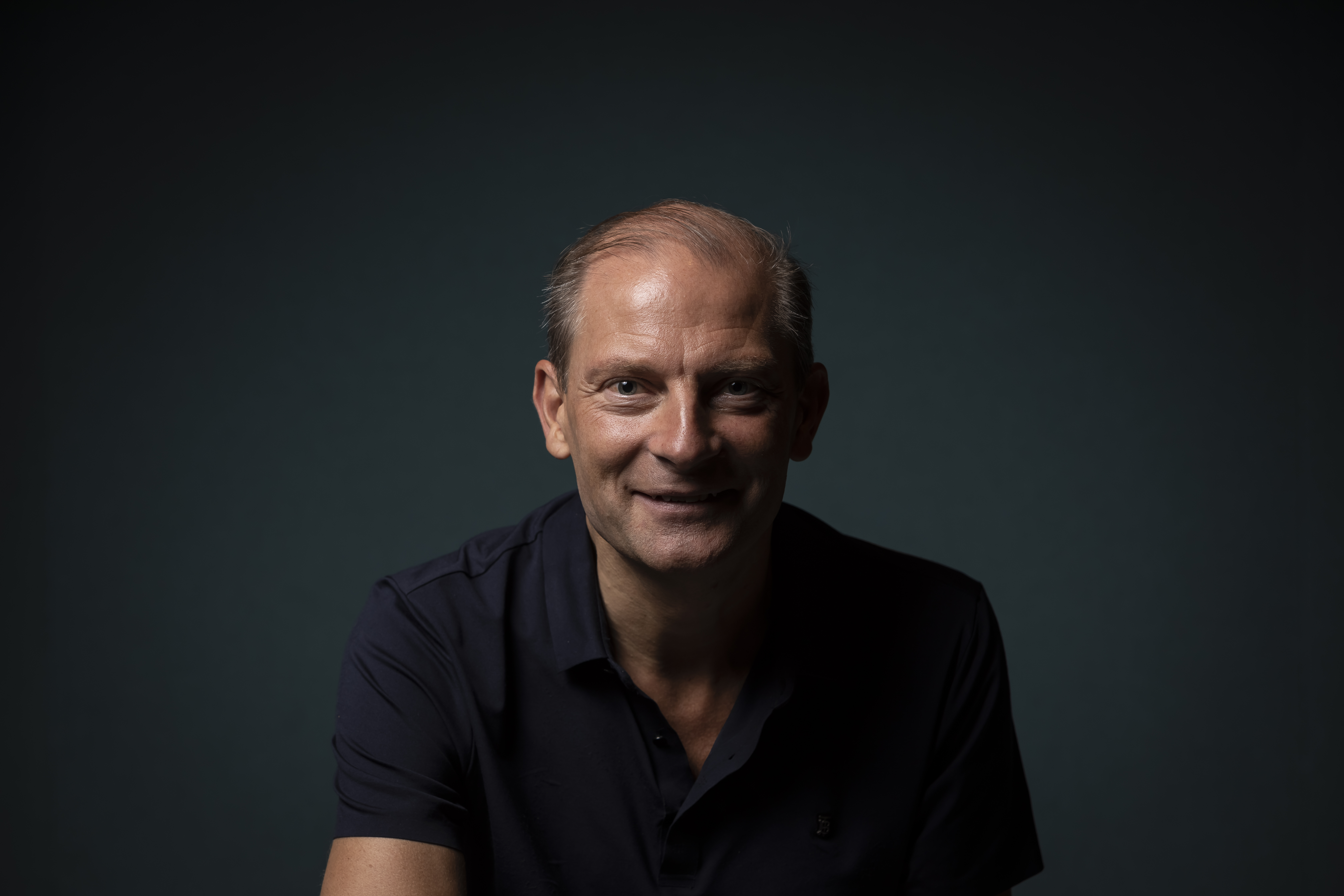
Cambridge Audio owner and Chairman James Johnson-Flint

In 1994 Cambridge Audio was acquired by Audio Partnership, a partnership owned by Julian Richer and James Johnson-Flint of Richer Sounds. The company is now solely owned by Johnson-Flint.

Audio Partnership set up production facilities in China, with Cambridge Audio products manufactured in the country from 1994.

The company established an office in Hong Kong in 2001 and an office in mainland China in 2011. Sales offices and teams were established in Hamburg, Germany and Hong Kong in 2015, followed by an office in Chicago in 2017.
