= Mordaunt-Short =

British loudspeaker manufacturer

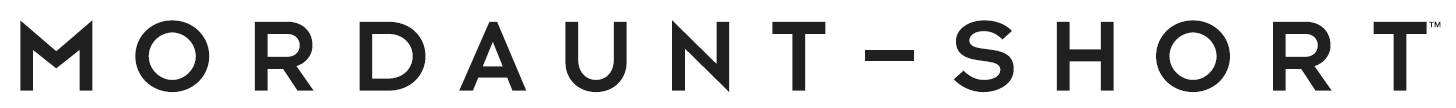

Mordaunt-Short is a British loudspeaker manufacturer. It is currently a subsidiary of Audio Partnership Plc., having been bought from TGI Plc. in 1999.

== History ==
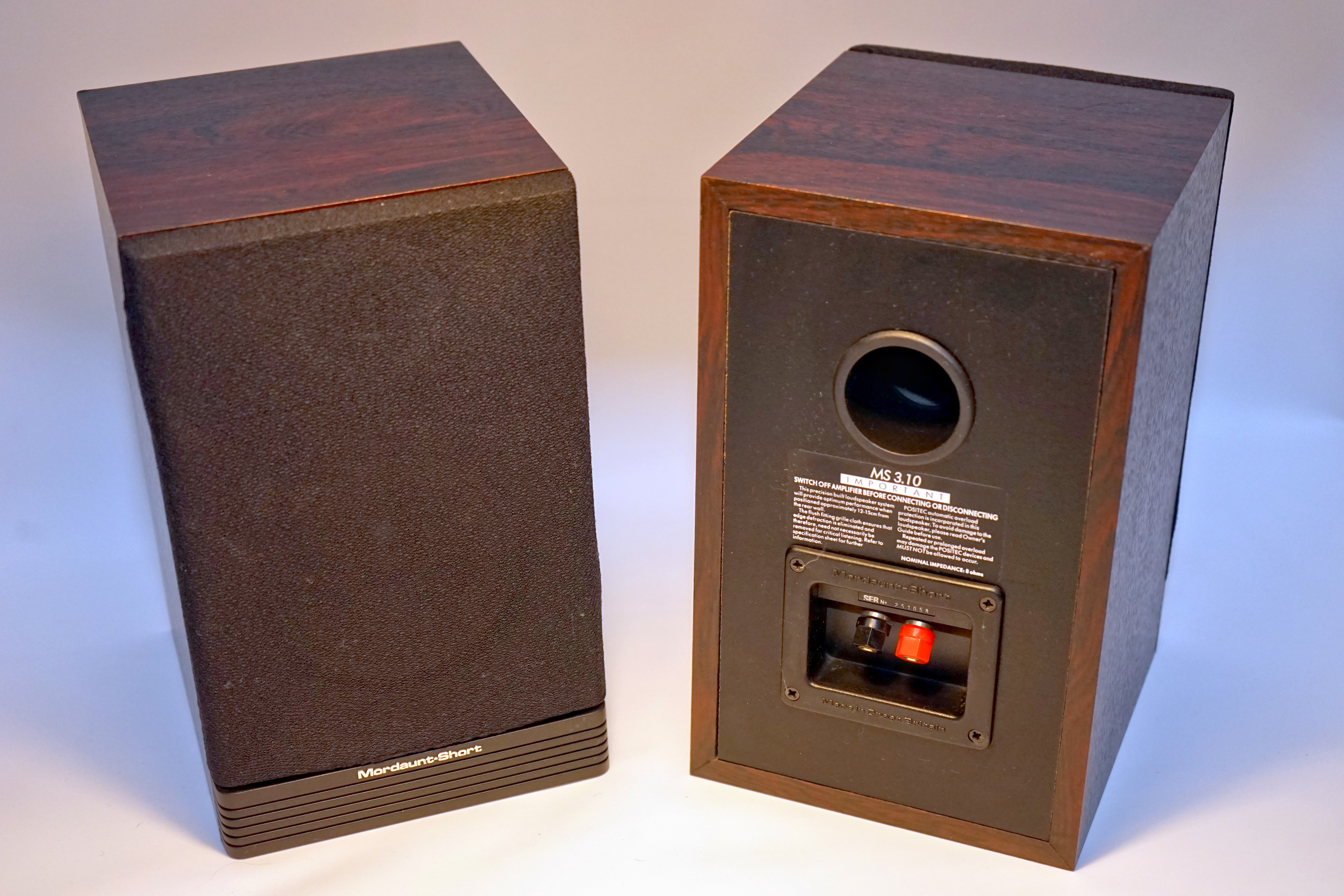
Mordaunt-Short, model 3.10

In 1967 Norman Mordaunt and Rodney Short combined their efforts and started a company based at Durford Mill, Petersfield, England until the 1980s. In the late 1970s Mordaunt-Short released three families of speakers: "Festival", "Carnival" and "Pageant". 1984 saw the release of the MS20, MS30 and MS40 ranges, followed by the MS25 and 35ti in 1987.

Mordaunt-Short was bought by TGI Plc. in 1987, forming the largest loudspeaker manufacturing company in Europe. TGI Plc. already owned Tannoy and Goodmans Loudspeakers Limited (GLL). In 1998 Epos was bought by Mordaunt-Short.

The MS10, MS20 and MS30 family name was used again in 1993 for the release of a budget line, alongside the "Performance" range.

Audio Partnership Plc., a successful hi-fi company, purchased the company in 1999 and created a new Research & Development centre. The following years brought about the introduction of the "Declaration" and "Premiere" series, with the "Avant" being their latest (2004) family.

In 2010 they brought out the Performance 2 range.

In 2011 the Aviano 8 was reviewed favourably by Hi-Fi News.

IN 2016 the "Mezzo" range of stereo and surround packages scored 5/5 in What Hi-Fi? Sound and Vision magazine.
