= Pro-Ject =

Austrian audio equipment manufacturer

Pro-Ject Audio Systems
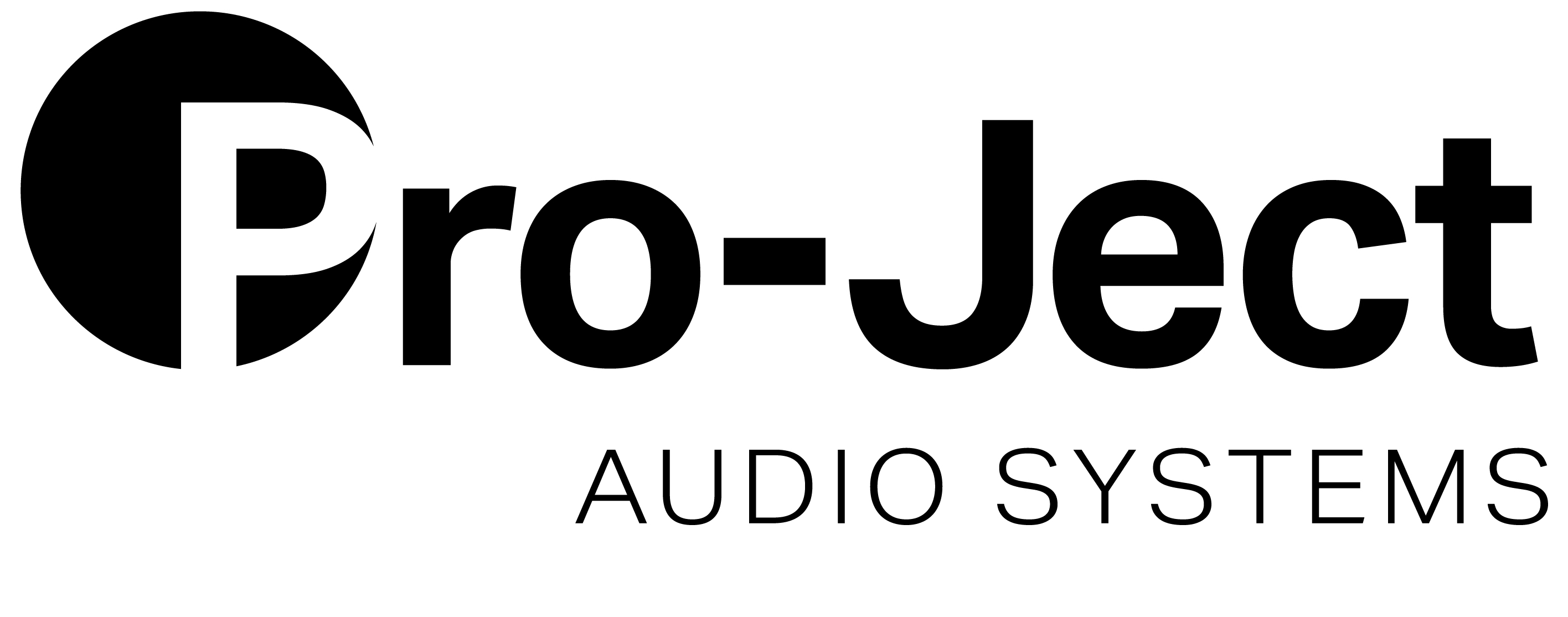
- Company type: Privately held company
- Industry: Electronics
- Founded: 1991; 35 years ago
- Headquarters: Mistelbach, Lower Austria, Austria
- Key people: Heinz Lichtenegger (founder and director)
- Products: Hi-fi equipment, Turntables
- Revenue: unknown
- Number of employees: approx. 300
- Website: project-audio.com

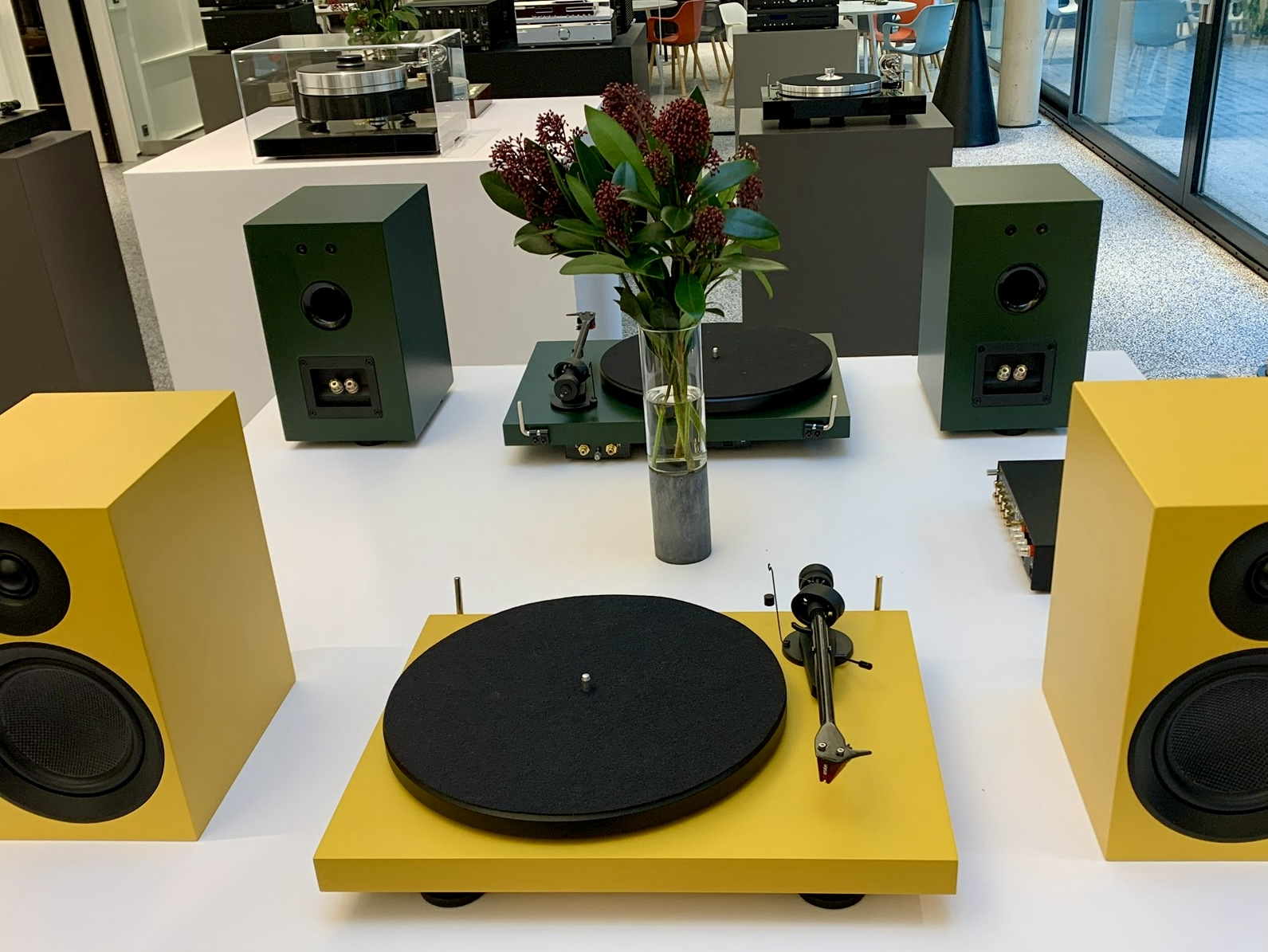
Debut EVO Soundsystem in the HQ showroom

Pro-Ject Audio Systems is a manufacturer of audiophile equipment, founded in 1991 by Heinz Lichtenegger and located in Mistelbach, Austria. Pro-Ject Audio Systems designs the products in Austria and produces them in plants located in Germany, Czech Republic and Slovakia.

Its product range includes a family of turntables, which are often quoted as reference entry-level models. The Pro-Ject Debut turntable, introduced in 1999, played a pivotal role in revitalizing interest in vinyl records (Phonograph record) by offering high-quality analog playback at an affordable price point, making quality turntables accessible to a broader audience.

Since 2015 Pro-Ject has released limited edition Artist Collection turntables in cooperation with the Beatles, The Rolling Stones, Metallica, Hans Theessink, Parov Stelar, and the Vienna Philharmonic.

They also manufactures a range of micro Hi-Fi components such as Amps, CD Transports, Phono Stages, Streaming Devices, Loudspeakers and more.

Pro-Ject Audio Systems is a division of Audio Tuning, that also owns Musical Fidelity, REKKORD AUDIO and TONE Factory.

== History ==
Pro-Ject founder Heinz Lichtenegger began producing and selling turntables under this brand name in 1991. The Pro-Ject 1, launched in 1991, marked the company's entry into the turntable market. Developed by founder Heinz Lichtenegger, this deck was essentially a modified version of the Tesla NC-500, a turntable produced in the Czech Republic. By enhancing the design with improved materials and engineering, Pro-Ject created an affordable yet high-quality turntable that laid the foundation for its future success.

=== Timeline ===
Significant events in the history of Pro-Ject Audio Systems

=== 1991 – Foundation ===
Heinz Lichtenegger founded Pro-Ject Audio Systems and launched the first turntable, the Pro-Ject 1. The consortium of the most experienced hi-fi editors within the Expert Imaging and Sound Association EISA has chosen the Pro-Ject 1 for an award in the category ‘Best Buy Turntable’.

=== 1993 – Partnership ===
After the collapse of the Iron Curtain, Pro-Ject partnered with a former Tesla factory in the Czech Republic, which continues to produce turntables for Pro-Ject.

=== 1994 – Pro-Ject 6 ===
Introduction of the first high-end turntable, the Pro-Ject 6.

=== 1999 – Debut Series ===
Launch of the Debut turntable, aiming to make hi-fi products more accessible; it has sold nearly one million units to date.

=== 2000 – New Factories ===
To support electronics production, Pro-Ject established new partnerships in the Czech Republic and Slovakia.

=== 2007 – Digital Entry ===
Introduction of the first digital products: Pre Box, Amp Box, and DAC Box.

=== Since 2015 – Artist Collection ===
Collaboration with artists such as Parov Stelar, The Beatles, Metallica and The Rolling Stones to create special edition turntables.

=== 2017 – Headquarters ===
Opening of new headquarters in Lower Austria, including offices, logistics center, administration, and R&D facilities.

=== 2021 – 30th Anniversary ===
Celebration marked by the release of the Debut PRO turntable.

=== 2023 – EVO Tonearms ===
Release of 24 different high-precision tonearms, handmade in Europe.

=== 2024 – Current Status ===
Pro-Ject operates in over 80 countries with more than 5,000 dealers, employing over 500 people across four factories, and has received numerous international awards, including EISA and Red Dot Design Awards.

== Pro-Ject Turntables in Film-Sets ==
Pro-Ject turntables have made notable appearances in various films, often serving as key elements in set designs. These placements underscore a cultural significance and aesthetic appeal of turntables in contemporary movies. For instance, the Pro-Ject Debut Carbon Line was featured in the film A Bigger Splash (2015 film) for the authentic portrayal of a character with a passion for vinyl records. It also appeared in the Music video of the Song “Giorgio by Moroder” by Daft Punk. Several Pro-Ject turntable models appeared in Do Not Disturb (2014 film), Westworld (TV series), Season 4, Suits (American TV series) or The Mechanic (2011 film).

== Gallery ==
Pro-Ject audio products
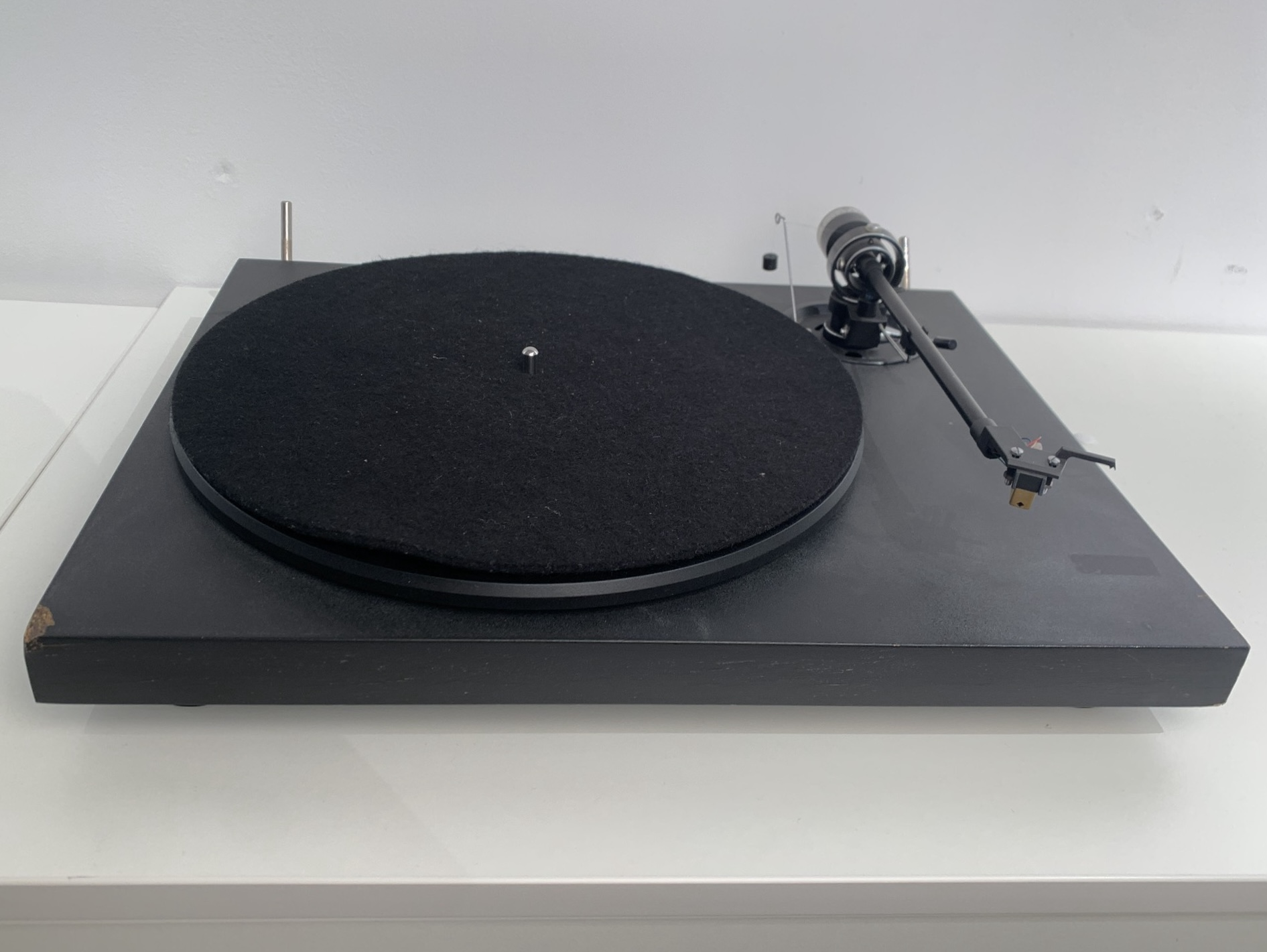
Pro-Ject 1 record player (1991) – the company's entry into the turntable market

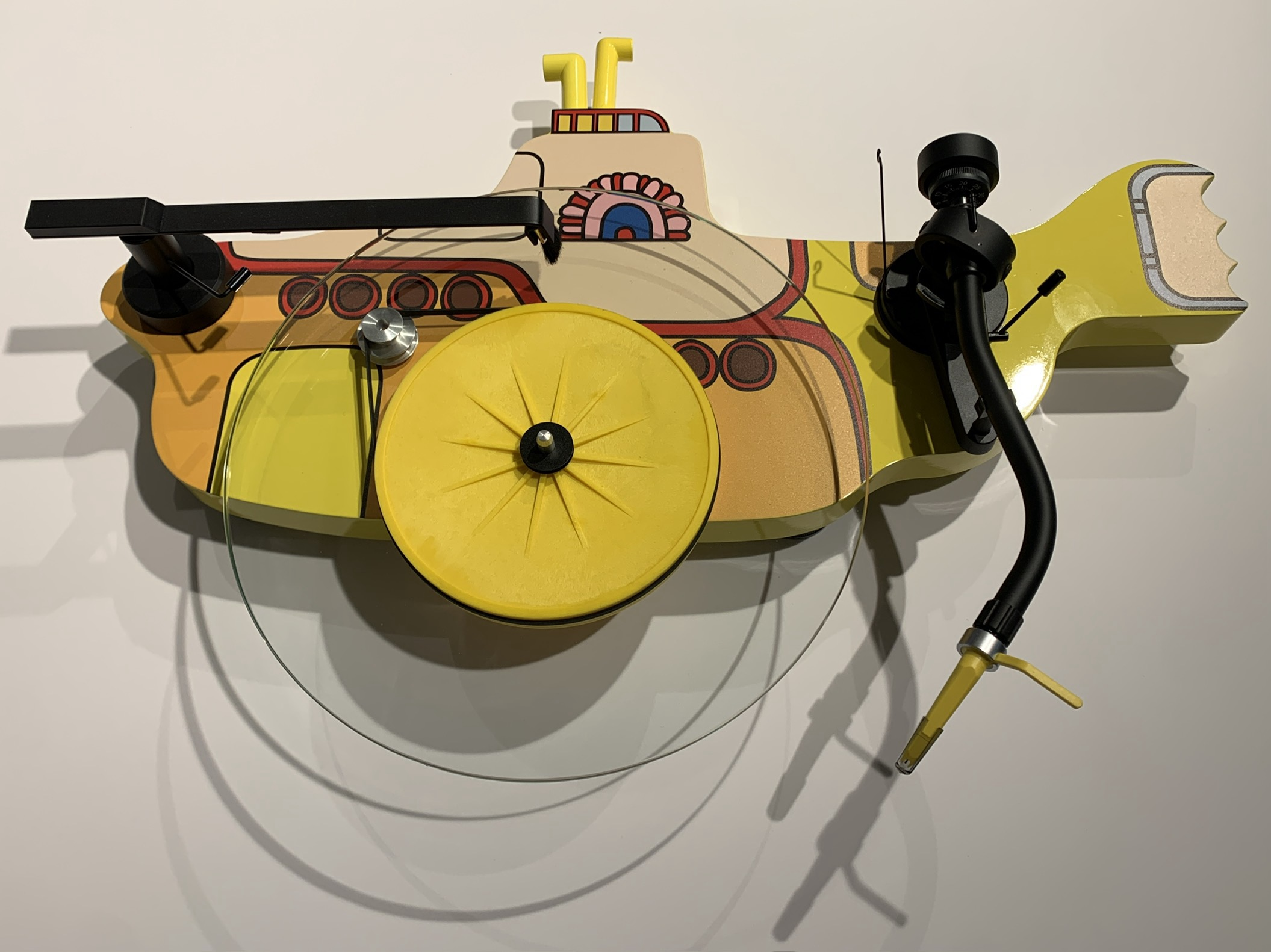
The Beatles Yellow Submarine turntable - part of the Artist Collection

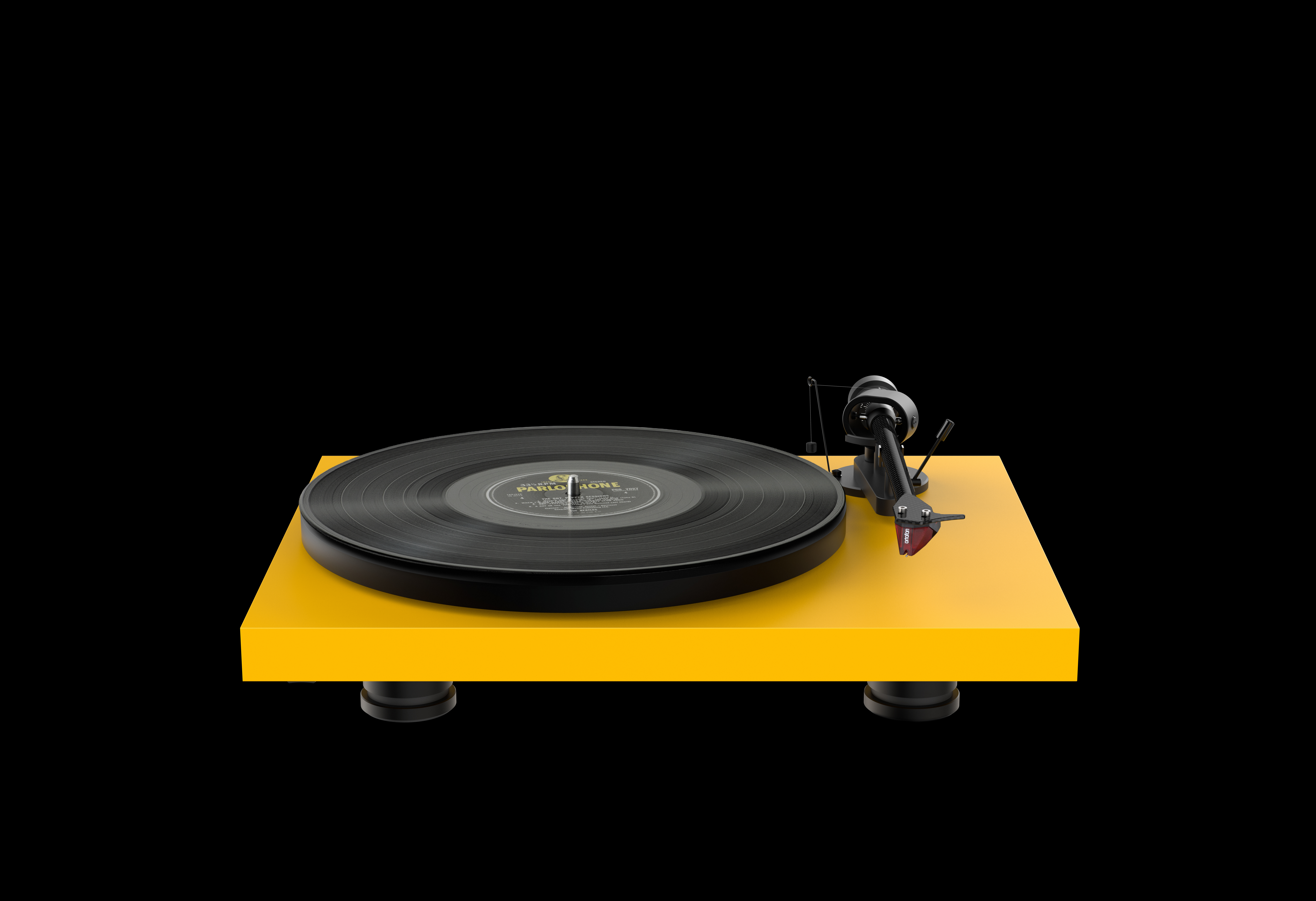
Debut Carbon EVO (2020) in Satin Yellow

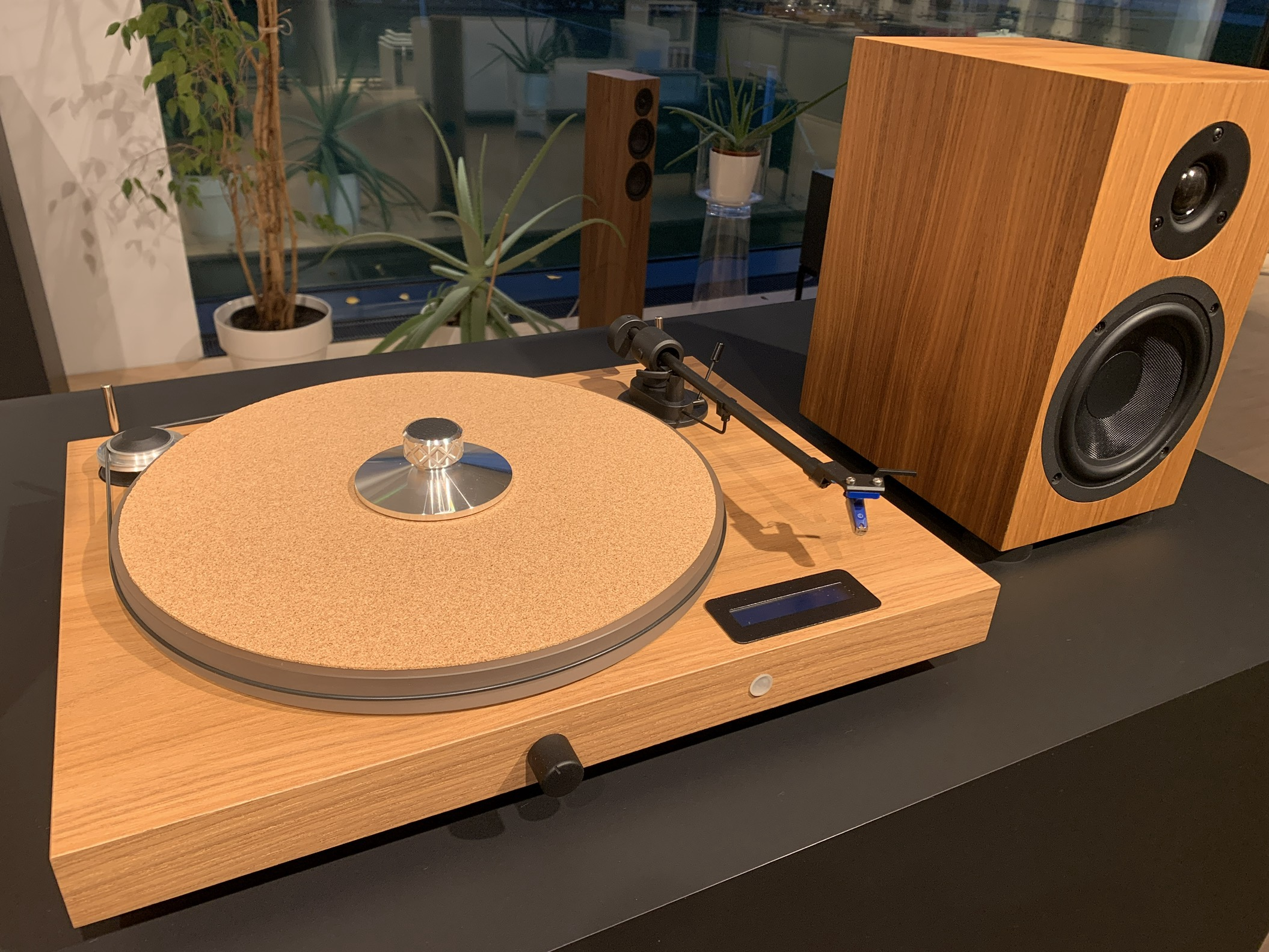
Pro-Ject Juke Box S2 Stereo Set

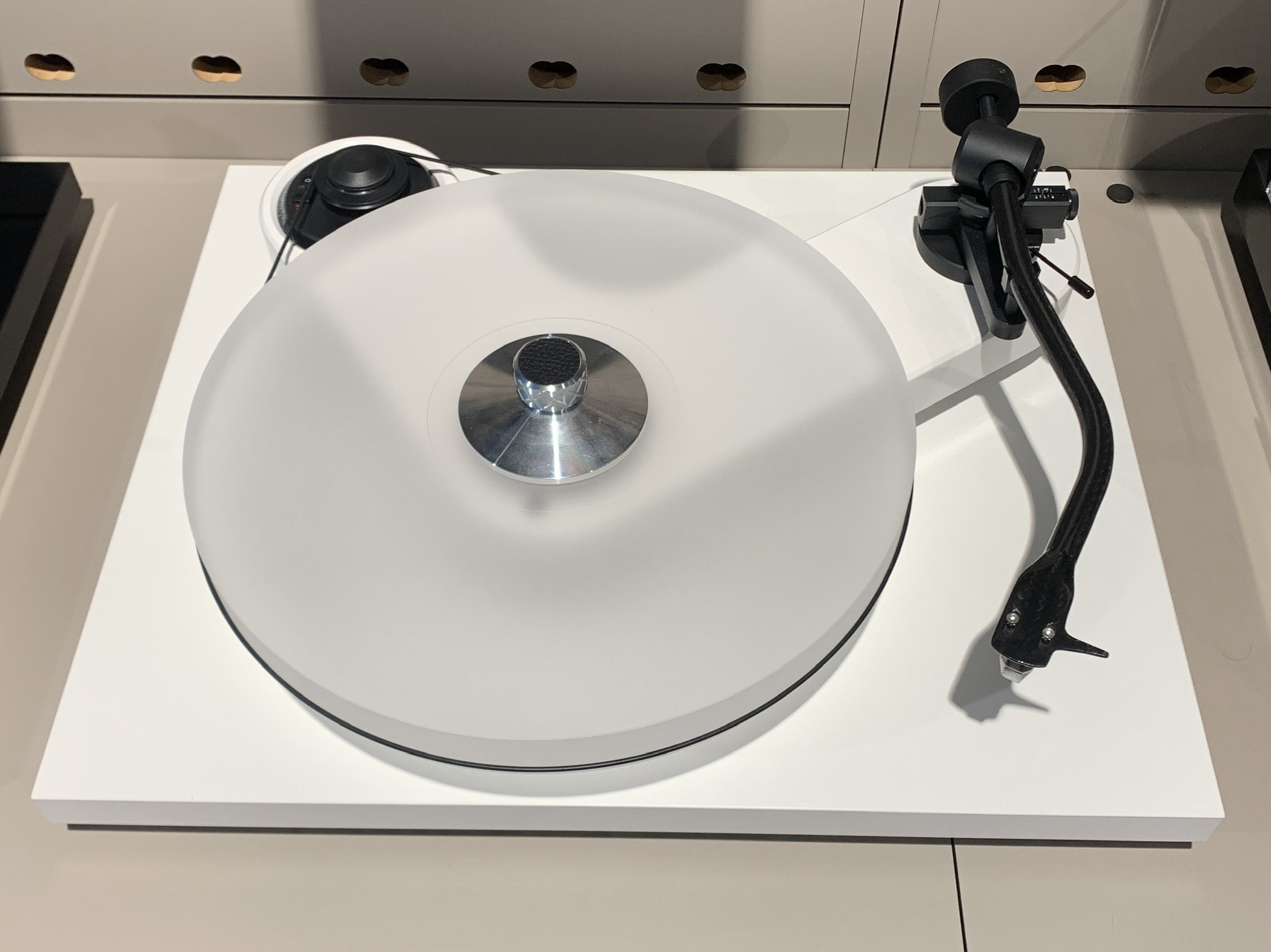
Pro-Ject RPM 3

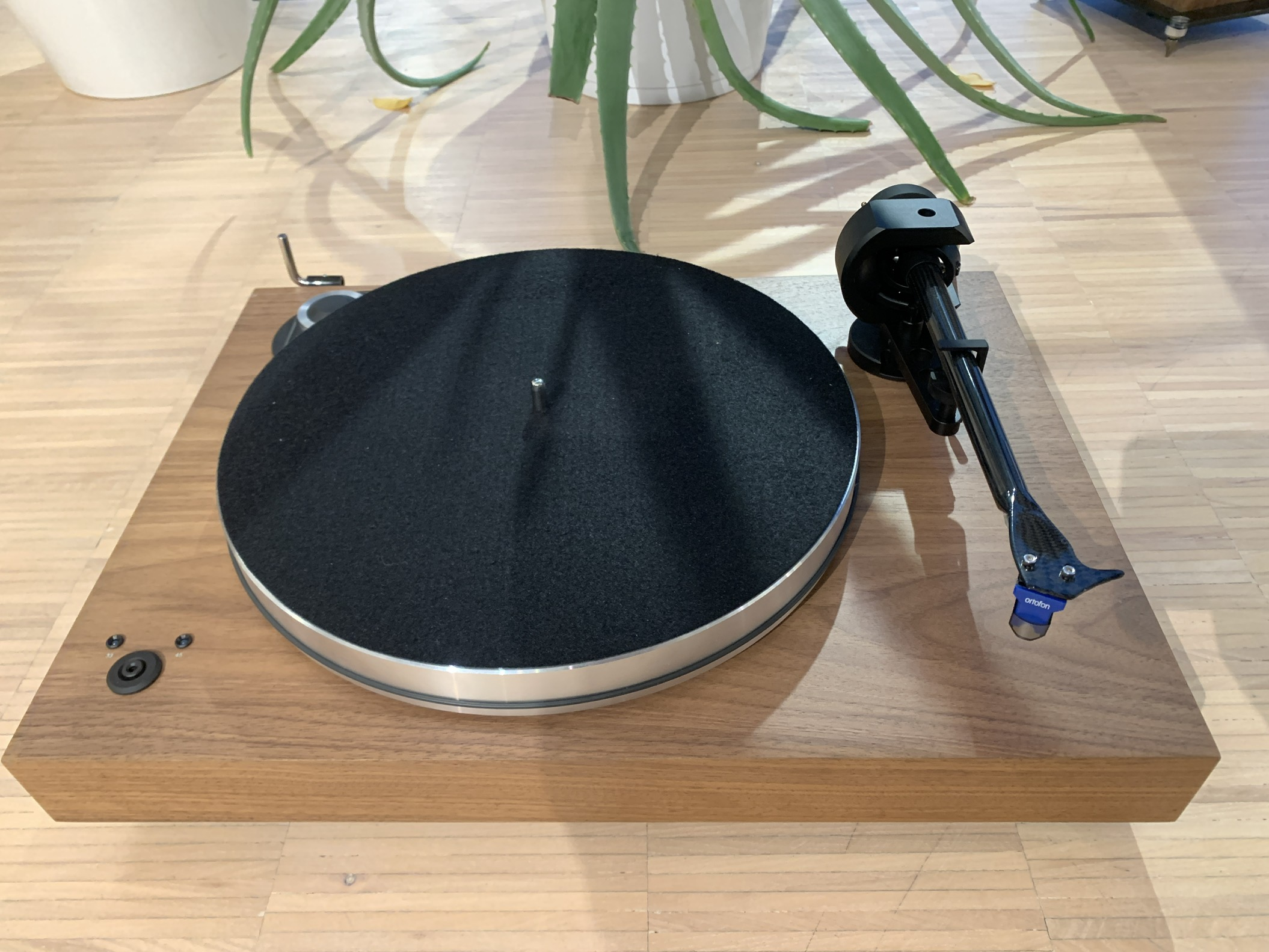
Pro-Ject X 8 evolution

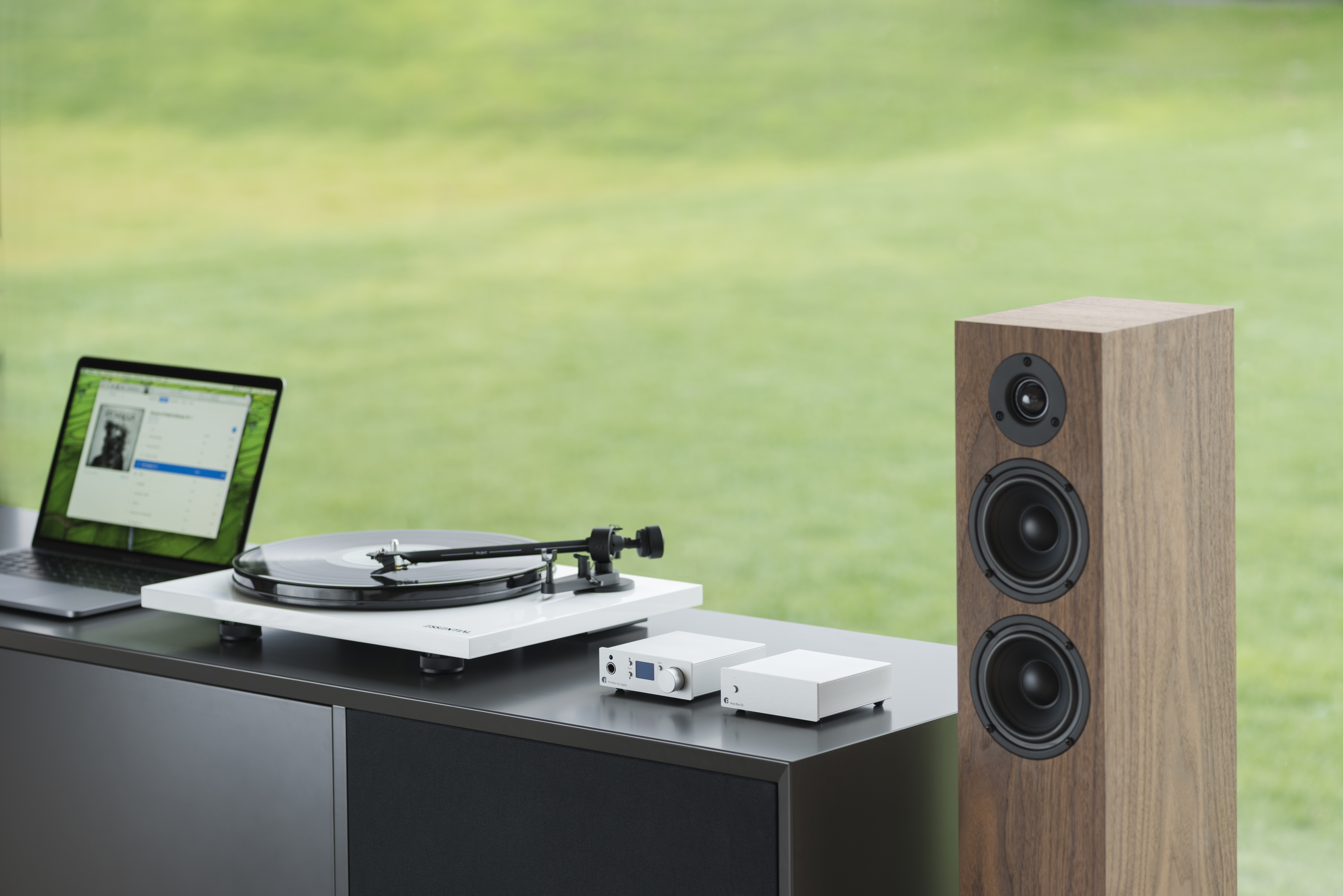
The Pre Box S2 Digital and Amp Box S2 with an Essential III Turntable

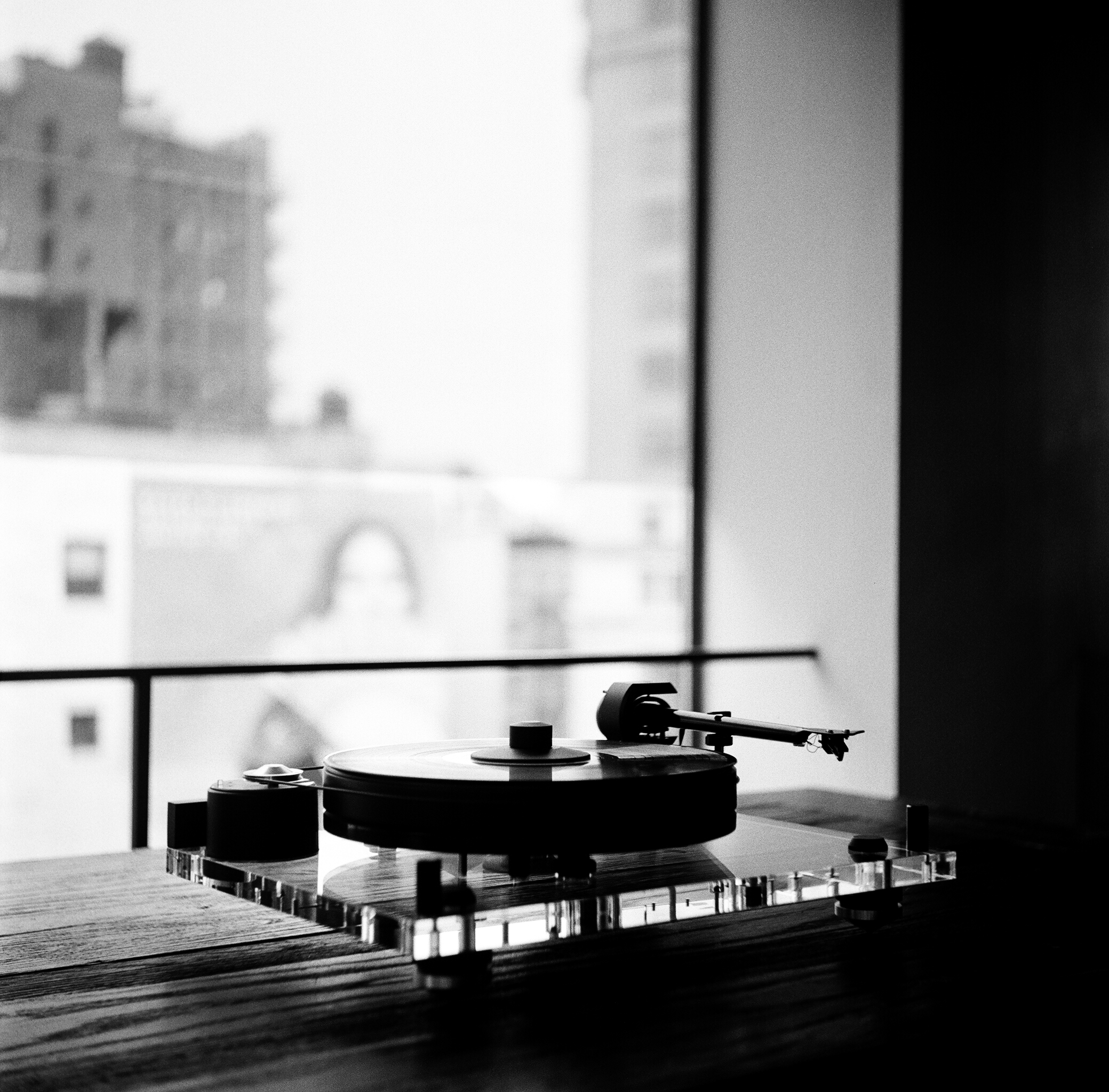
6PerspeX turntable photographed in New York (2018)

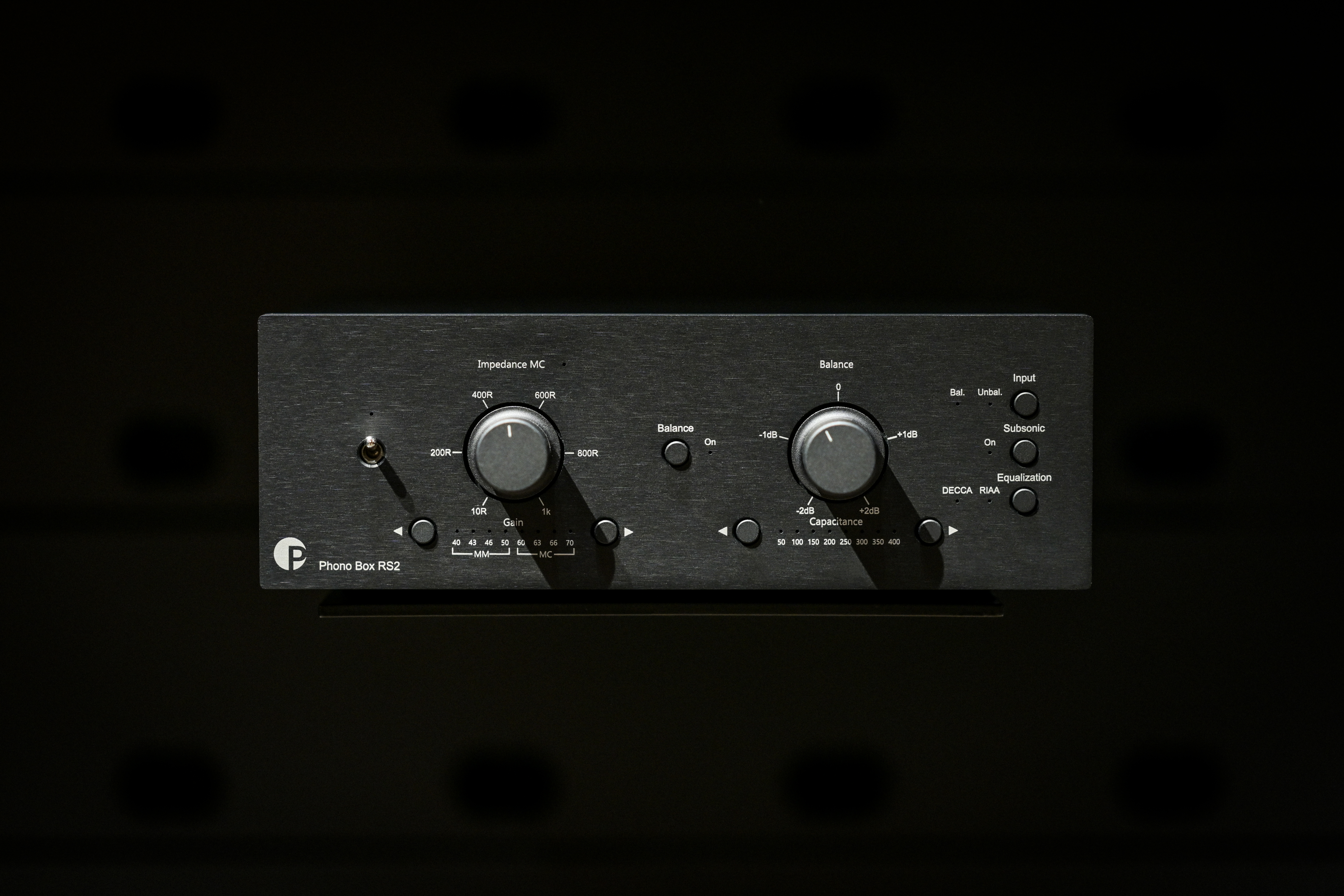
Phono Box RS2 (Phono Preamplifier)

== See also ==
- List of phonograph manufacturers
