= List of compositions by Caroline Shaw =

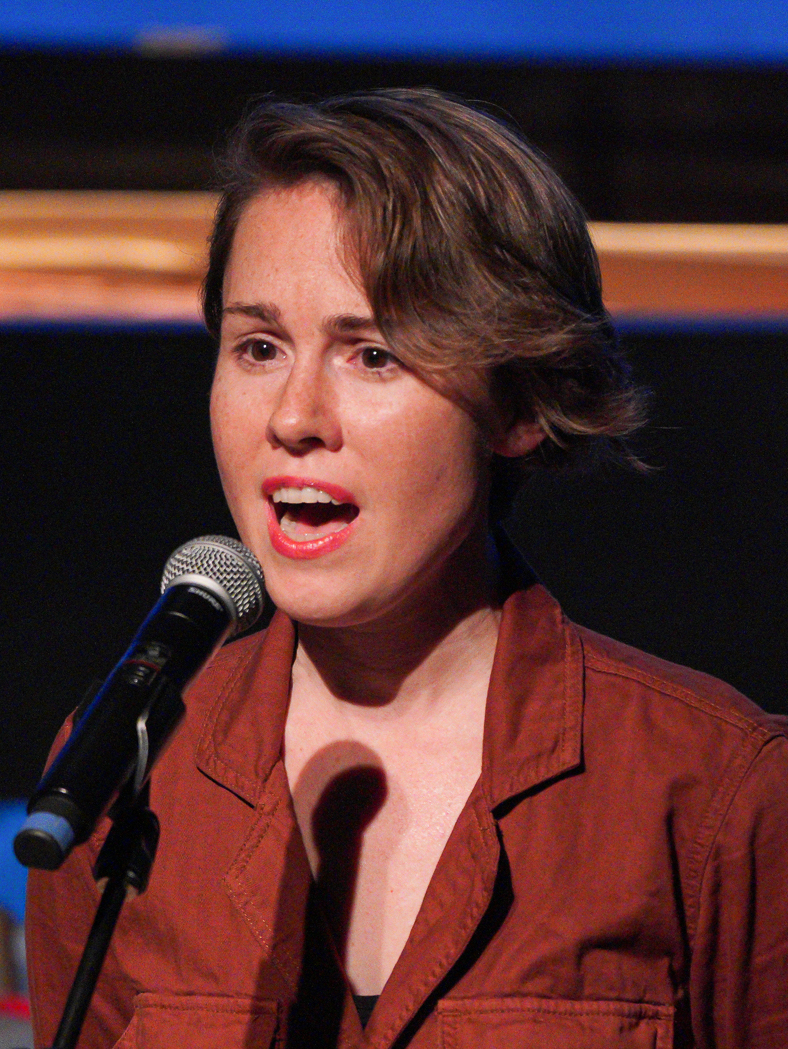
Caroline Shaw in 2020

Caroline Shaw (born 1982) is an American composer of contemporary classical music. Though best known for her vocal and choral music, Shaw's compositions also include chamber, orchestral, multimedia and solo instrumental music, as well as film scores.

== List of compositions ==
=== Voice ===
- Cantico delle creature (2007), for soprano, violin, and piano (with an arrangement for an additional cello), premiered by Abigail Haynes Lennox, and Shaw in April 2007.
- By and By, for string quartet and voice, premiered by Abigail Lennox and the Hudson Quartet on March 11, 2010.
- Sounds of the Ocean Cassette Vol. 1, for narrator, cassette player, and two instruments, premiered in September 2011.
- Fly Away I, for SATB chorus, premiered by the International Orange Chorale of San Francisco in June 2012.
- Partita for 8 Voices, four pieces for eight singers, written 2009–2011 for Roomful of Teeth, premiered as a whole on November 4, 2013, winner of the 2013 Pulitzer Prize for Music.
- Its Motion Keeps, for treble chorus and viola or cello, commissioned by the Brooklyn Youth Chorus, premiered, with Shaw on viola, in November 2013.
- Music in Common Time, for chorus and strings, premiered by Roomful of Teeth and A Far Cry on May 10, 2014.
- Anni’s Constant, for chorus, two violins, cello, piano, guitar, bass guitar, and percussion, commissioned by the Brooklyn Youth Chorus and BAM, premiered November 2014.
- and the swallow, for SATB chorus, on text from Psalm 84; premiered by the Netherlands Chamber Choir on November 11, 2017.
- Dolce Cantavi, for three voices (SSA), on a text by Francesca Turina Bufalini, Contessa di Stupinigi (1544-1641), commissioned and premiered by TENET (Jolle Greenleaf, Molly Quinn, and Virginia Warnken Kelsey performing).
- Cant voi l’aube (2016), on an anonymous 12th century French trouvère text; written for Anne Sofie von Otter and Brooklyn Rider.
- To the Hands (2016), commissioned by The Crossing for Seven Responses, a seven-piece compilation inspired by Dieterich Buxtehude's Membra Jesu Nostri cantatas.
- so quietly (2016), premiered on June 9, 2016, by the Brooklyn Youth Chorus.
- This Might Also Be a Form of Dreaming (2016), for voices and small chamber group, on text from Don't Let Me Be Lonely by Claudia Rankine, commissioned by the Ojai Music Festival where it was premiered on June 11, 2016, by Shaw and Roomful of Teeth.
- Is a Rose, three songs commissioned by the Philharmonia Baroque Orchestra for Anne Sofie von Otter:
  - red, red rose (2016), on words by Robert Burns
  - The Edge (2017), on words by Jacob Polley
  - And So (2018), on words by Shaw, Burns, Gertrude Stein, and Billy Joel
- Narrow Sea (2017), a five-part song cycle on texts from The Sacred Harp.
- How to fold the Wind (2020), for 12-part SATB chorus; premiered by Ars Nova Copenhagen on September 20, 2020.

=== Solo instrument ===
- in manus tuas, for cello or viola, premiered by Hannah Collins in 2009.
- Gustave Le Gray, for piano, premiered by Amy Yang on April 24, 2012.
- The Walking Man, for shakuhachi, written with and for Riley Lee, premiered on April 3, 2012.

=== Chamber ensemble ===
- Punctum (2009, revised 2013), for string quartet, workshopped in 2009–2010 with the Hudson Quartet and the Franklin Quartet, premiered in April 2010. Revised in 2013 for the Brentano Quartet.
- Entr'acte, for string quartet, premiered by the Brentano Quartet on March 21, 2011.
- Jacques Duran, for string trio, premiered by Lorna Tsai, Sage Cole, and Jonina Allan Mazzeo on August 26, 2011.
- Limestone & Felt, for cello and viola, premiered by Hannah Collins and Hannah Shaw in January 2012.
- Taxidermy, for percussion quartet (flower pots, vibraphones, and marimba), premiered by Sō Percussion on May 2, 2012.
- Valencia, for string quartet, premiered by Lorna Tsai, Shaw, Sage Cole, and Shay Rudolph in August 2012.
- Boris Kerner, for cello and flower pots, premiered by New Morse Code (Hannah Collins and Mike Compitello) on November 20, 2012.
- Plan & Elevation: The Grounds of Dumbarton Oaks, for string quartet, commissioned by Dumbarton Oaks, premiered by the Dover Quartet on November 1, 2015.
- Draft of a High-Rise, for sextet, commissioned by Carnegie Hall and yMusic, premiered by the latter on December 2, 2016. In three movements (Inked Frame; A Scribbled Veneer; Their Stenciled Breath ).
- Blueprint (2016), for string quartet, commissioned by the Wolf Trap Foundation for the Performing Arts for the Aizuri Quartet.
- First Essay: Nimrod (2016), commissioned by Coretet for the Calidore String Quartet, premiered November 6, 2016.
- Second Essay: Echo and Third Essay: Ruby, commissioned by the BBC and Chamber Music Northwest, premiered at The Proms by the Calidore String Quartet on July 16, 2018.
- Really Craft When You (2017), commissioned by Bang on a Can All Stars.
- The Evergreen (2020), for string quartet, commissioned by Third Angle New Music, Bravo! Vail, Coretet, and Ragazze Quartet. In four movements (Moss; Stem; Water; Root).
- Concerto for Harpsichord and Strings (2023), commissioned by Byron Schenkman & Friends (re-named Sound Salon). Premiered on March 26, 2023, with Byron Schenkman, at Benaroya Hall in Seattle, WA.

=== Orchestra ===
- Entr’acte, for string orchestra (2014) (an arrangement of the 2011 work for string quartet), commissioned by A Far Cry.
- The Baltimore Bomb (2016), commissioned by the Baltimore Symphony Orchestra, premiered on September 17, 2016.
- Lo (2016), concerto for violin and orchestra, premiered March 16, 2016 by Shaw and the Cincinnati Symphony Orchestra, which co-commissioned the work with the Indianapolis Symphony Orchestra, the North Carolina Symphony, and the Princeton Symphony Orchestra.
- Watermark (2018), concerto for piano and orchestra, commissioned by the Seattle Symphony and the Saint Paul Chamber Orchestra, premiered on January 31, 2019, by pianist Jonathan Biss and the Seattle Symphony.
- The Listeners (2019), cantata/oratorio for orchestra, chorus, two soloists, and turntable; on texts by Walt Whitman, William Drummond of Hawthornden, Alfred, Lord Tennyson, Carl Sagan, Yesenia Montilla, and Lucille Clifton; premiered on October 17, 2019, by the Philharmonia Baroque Orchestra under conductor Nicholas McGegan.
- The Observatory (2019), premiered on August 27, 2019, at the Hollywood Bowl by the Los Angeles Philharmonic with Xian Zhang conducting. The work was inspired by a visit to the Griffith Observatory and the music of science fiction.
- Brush (2021), commissioned by the Britt Festival Orchestra, premiered on July 30, 2021, in Jacksonville, Oregon with Teddy Abrams conducting. The work is an experiential installation piece, consisting of multiple stations of musicians that the audience encounters spread along a woodlands trail system. The final station calls for a chamber orchestra which plays a 23-minute repeating work, with musical material drawing from the fragments heard throughout the trails.

=== Multimedia ===
- Ritornello, premiered on January 27, 2012.

=== Film and television ===
- To Keep the Light (2016)
- Madeline's Madeline (2018).
- The Sky Is Everywhere (2022)
- Fleishman Is in Trouble (miniseries) (2022)
- Leonardo da Vinci (miniseries) (2024)
