= Emily Johnson =

American dancer (born 1976)

- Born: Emily August Johnson; March 19, 1976 (age 50); Soldotna, Alaska
- Occupations: Dancer; writer; choreographer; artistic director
- Years active: 1998–present
- Career
- Current group: Catalyst
- Dances: SHORE, Niicugni, The Thank-you Bar, Heat & Life, Something More Useful Then, One For Resolve, Plain Old Andrea, With a Gun, Pamela, Fierce:Whole
- Website: Official Site catalystdance.com

Emily Johnson (born March 19, 1976, in Soldotna, Alaska) is an American dancer, writer, and choreographer of Yup'ik descent. She grew up in Sterling, Alaska, and is based in New York City. She is artistic director of her performance company, Emily Johnson/Catalyst. Johnson is a organizer for the First Nations Dialogues New York/Lenapehoking. She has worked part-time at Birchbark Books, an independent bookstore owned by author Louise Erdrich.

== Performative, administrative and choreographic work ==
Johnson has danced for Minneapolis-based choreographers Morgan Thorson, Hijack, and BodyCartography Project, and collaborated with New York-based playwright/ director Lisa D'Amour and music ensemble So Percussion, as well as Korean visual artist Minouk Lim.

In 1998 Johnson founded a dance company, Catalyst, in Minneapolis, after graduating from the University of Minnesota with a degree in dance. Since then, she has created 22 original performance pieces, as well as several collaborative projects with other artists, including SHORE, the third part of a trilogy of works that began with The Thank-you Bar (2009) and Niicugni (2012), and which was performed on tour through 2015. She has been central in organizing the Indigenous gathering Knowledge of Wounds starting in 2017.

== Choreographic style ==
Johnson states that she began dance as a response to the grief of a close friend dying.

Johnson's dances "...often function as installations", and her choreography "...considers the experience of sensing and seeing performance." In a presentation at the University of Minnesota in 2014, she talked about her choreographic practice as dance responding to the world.

== Dance and community ==
One distinguishing characteristic of Johnson's work is community involvement in particular located places. Among the motivating concerns for The thank you bar (trilogy part 1) were community and tribal responses to displacement. In Vermont, Minnesota, Alaska, California, and Arizona, she invited members of the community to sew fish skin together to form lanterns. These lantern were subsequently hung, with lights and speakers inside, to illuminate halls where Niicugni (trilogy part 2) was performed. Shore (trilogy part 3) included community feasting. Johnson organized a recent work, Then a cunning voice and a night we spend gazing at stars, with community quiltmaking workshops. The quilts became part of the set for the dance performance.

This community involvement in dance echoes other dance forms, which are often less formal and outside of the usual definition of "contemporary" dance, such as participatory dance Participation Dance and ceremonial dance Ceremonial Dance. Johnson's oeuvre may be seen as a bridge between community and cultural contexts, on the one hand, and the world of contemporary artistry, on the other hand. As Vermont Performance Lab director Sara Coffey observes, there may be a tension between artistic vision and openness to community: "I think it's very brave in the contemporary dance world to let all these others into your work... You don't always have control of what that's going to be. I think Emily, as an artist, wants a place to rub off on her work as much as she wants to rub off on the place where she's performing". Johnson attempts to resolve this tension through dynamism, described in the Anchorage Museum's Polar Lab blog as using "dance as a framework for constant transformation that refuses to stabilize, intervention immediately opens up for exchange, conversation and partnership" (anonymous account,).

== Awards ==
Emily Johnson / Catalyst was awarded a 2012 Outstanding Production ("new art, dance and performance") Bessie Award for The Thank-you Bar, created and performed by Johnson with collaborators James Everest and Joel Pickard.

- Doris Duke Performing Artist Award, 2014
- Robert Rauschenberg Foundation Residency, 2014
- McKnight Foundation Artist Fellowship for Choreographers, 2013
- Creative Capital Award, 2013
- Joyce Foundation Fellowship, 2013
- The Doris Duke Residency to Build Demand for the Arts, 2013
- Map Fund, lead artist, 2013
- NPN Creation Fund, 2012
- Map Fund, lead artist, 2012
- New York Dance and Performance Award (Bessie Award) for Outstanding Production, 2012 (The Thank-you Bar)
- Sage Award for Outstanding Performance, 2011 (The Thank-you Bar)
- National Dance Project Production Grant, 2011
- New England Foundation for the Arts Native Artist Exchange, 2011
- Artist of the Year, City Pages, 2010
- Native Arts and Cultures Foundation Artist Fellowship for Dance, 2011
- MAP Fund, 2010, lead artist
- Metropolitan Regional Arts Council, Community Fund, 2009
- National Dance Project Touring Grant, 2009
- Map Fund, 2009, lead artist
- Loft, Native InRoads Writing Program, 2009
- McKnight Foundation Artist Fellowship for Choreographers, 2009
- Seventh Generation Fund Grant, 2009
- NPN Creation Fund, 2008
- Forecast Public Artworks, Research and Development Grant, 2008
- Smithsonian Institution Expressive Arts Award, with Rhiana Yazzie, 2008
- The Puffin Foundation, 2005
- Bush Foundation Artist Fellowship, 2004
- Jerome Foundation Artist Fellowship 2004, 2003, 2002, 2001
- Minnesota State Arts Board Artist Fellowship 2001
