= Smule (app) =

American karaoke social media service

- Developer: Smule Inc.
- Release: 2012 (iOS); 2013 (Android); 2015 (Apple TV)
- Operating system: iOS, Android, Apple TV

Smule is an American music app initially released under the name Sing!, Karaoke in iOS platforms on 2012 and subsequently on Android in 2013. Smule expanded its music experience to include the web in 2016, albeit in a consultative format for now.

In October 2017, Smule started offering official Disney duets starting with the song "You're Welcome" with Dwayne "The Rock" Johnson's Moana character, Maui. It was the first of several animated duets that are available on the app. The Smule app also allows users to perform duets alongside many international artists such as Jason Derulo, Ed Sheeran, Luis Fonsi, Demi Lovato, J Balvin, Charlie Puth, Shawn Mendes, Luke Bryan, Polina Gagarina, and Siti Badriah.

Smule was described as "the biggest music app you haven't heard of" adding that "fifty million people use it at least once a month" according to a CNET article from 2018.

In 2018, Smule launched LiveJam, "a feature that it billed as the first time anyone can sing live with another user anywhere in the world, in real time." In 2020, Smule updated their popular LiveJam feature to be audio-only for users who don't subscribe in order to make it a safer and more secure experience for the community.

In October 2020, they released Styles, a creative tool for performances that combines audio and video filters to give singers new ways to creatively express themselves. After hearing that the community wanted more control over the feature, it was updated a few weeks later to allow users to edit the individual audio and video components of a Style.

== Development ==
TechCrunch explained:

Smule co-founder and CTO Ge Wang says the collaborative features should help with Smule’s broader goal of making music performance more fun and accessible. When someone opens a Smule app, he says they shouldn’t ask themselves, “Am I a musician?” because the answer is usually no. Instead, the goal is to draw people in, then by the time they realize they’re making music, “it’s too late — they’re already having fun.” With Sing, it’s it should be less intimidating to join in an already-created song than it would be to start singing on your own.

An update of the app added new filters such as one that makes the user sound like they are singing in the shower. Smule continued to invest resources in developing audio and video filters. In October 2020, they announced Styles - pre-made templates with video and/or audio effects that enhance the performance and allow for more self-expression. The following year, they integrated with Snap to offer users more effects, like beautifying filters, props and backgrounds.

Users can sing duets with other Smule users anywhere in the world in real-time. Smule has been granted a patent for how it handles latency in this scenario.

To make it easier for casual singers to explore singing, in 2021 Smule introduced a feature called Moments which gives users the ability to also select and sing just a small section of a song.

== Music collaboration ==
Users choose a song and either sing along to it as a solo, duet, or group performance. Performances are uploaded to Smule's database and the user decides if they would like to keep the performance private or share it with the community and invite others to join their performance. Users can enable video recording mode if they want to record both video and audio. A private flag may also be enabled, if users don't want to allow others to listen to their recording.

== Critical reception ==
Smule has been received positively by their growing user base over the last decade for their innovative collaborative capabilities, video features and variety of FX at user disposal. As of May 2021, the Smule app had a 4.5 rating out of 5 in the App Store with over 136k ratings given by users. In a surge of popularity in May 2021, the app briefly rose to the #2 Free App in the App Store and the #1 Music App in the App Store for over a week.

148Apps said "Sing! Join the global karaoke party! is either going to horrify or delight people, depending on their point of view on karaoke, in general. Yes, there are a lot of bad singers out there, but the name of the game is to have fun, and with the whole world as a stage, Sing! can be an awful lot of fun."

AppAdvice said "As far as music selection, the free app is a mixed bag."

Appolicious concluded "That’s the beauty of Sing! It may or may not yield a Beyoncé, Snoop Dogg, Idina Menzel, John Mayer or even a Rebecca Black, but it is a wonderful way for singers the world over to unite and make a joyful communal sound."
