= Perry R. Cook =

American computer music researcher

Perry R. Cook (born September 25, 1955) is an American computer music researcher and professor emeritus of computer science and music at Princeton University. He was also founder and head of the Princeton Sound Lab.

Cook has worked in the areas of physical modeling, singing voice synthesis, music information retrieval, principles of computer music controller design, audio analysis and real-time computer music programming languages and systems, and has written a number of books on these subjects. Together with Gary Scavone, he authored the Synthesis Toolkit and with Ge Wang the ChucK programming language. He is also a co-founder, with Dan Trueman in 2005, of the Princeton Laptop Orchestra (PLOrk). Cook was an invited keynote speaker at NIME-07, held in New York City in June, 2007. He is a Fellow of the Association for Computing Machinery (2008) and the Guggenheim Foundation (2003).

Cook is also an avid conch shell musician, including the ancient conch-shell Peruvian instrument known as pututus.

Cook is a founding advisor (since 2008) to Smule, a successful mobile music app company.

In 2012, Cook and Ajay Kapur received an NSF-funded grant to create a programming and technology curriculum for art schools. Beginning in 2013 with Ajay Kapur and others, Cook co-founded Kadenze, an online arts education company.

His adviser was Julius Orion Smith III at Stanford.
