= Laptop orchestra =

Chamber music ensemble consisting primarily of laptops

A laptop orchestra (lork or LO) or laptop ensemble (LE) is a chamber music ensemble consisting primarily of laptops. Education based laptop orchestras include SCLOrk (Santa Clara University Laptop Orchestra), BLOrk (University of Colorado Boulder Laptop Orchestra), CLOrk (Concordia Laptop Orchestra), CMLO (CMU Laptop Orchestra, Carnegie Mellon), HELO (Huddersfield Experimental Laptop Orchestra), L2Ork (Virginia Tech Linux Laptop Orchestra) OLO (Oslo Laptop Orchestra), PLOrk (Princeton Laptop Orchestra), SLOrk (Stanford Laptop Orchestra), SAMPLE (Portland State University Sonic Arts and Music Production Laptop Ensemble), and ELUNM (Ensamble de Laptops de la Universidad Nacional de Música in Peru. City based laptop orchestras include BiLE (Birmingham Laptop Ensemble), MiLO (Milwaukee Laptop Orchestra), and BSBLOrk (The Brasília Laptop Orchestra), MLOrk (Milano Laptop Orchestra), LOrk•A (Aristotle University Laptop Orchestra).

== CLOrk ==
Concordia Laptop Orchestra (CLOrk) is an ensemble of laptop performers, consisting of up to 25 members, based at Concordia University's Music Department in Montreal, Quebec, Canada. Founded and directed by professor Eldad Tsabary, CLOrk specializes in networked and multidisciplinary performances and collaborations, such as with dance and video.

CLOrk's first performance (January 2011) was a telematic collaboration with other laptop ensembles across Canada as part of the University of Calgary Happening Festival. Since that performance, CLOrk has performed telematically on several occasions with other laptop ensembles (such as McMaster's Cybernetic Orchestra) and acoustic ensembles at New York University, University of California, San Diego, Queen's University Belfast, Hamburg Hochschule of Music, University of California, Irvine, and Mustek duo (Edinburgh), among others, at international events such as Birmingham Network Music Festival, ToBeContinued, and Penta Locus.

The laptop orchestra trend began with the Princeton Laptop Orchestra (PLOrk) in 2005 and continued with the emergence of many laptop orchestras and ensembles around the world, each characterized by certain technological traits and artistic approaches. CLOrk is characterized by a non-uniform technological approach, based on the idea of "music first; technology follows," by its network music activities, by its collaboration with acoustic ensembles, and by its use of soundpainting conduction.

== Electro-Acoustic Ensemble ==
Electro-Acoustic Ensemble
- Logo

Background information
- Origin: New Orleans, Louisiana, USA
- Genres: electro-acoustic music, experimental music
- Years active: 2009–present
- Members: Director; Paul J. Botelho Current Members; Delerio Bailey; Josh Campbell; Lukas Cox; Elliot Downey; Ross Farbe; Jack Friese; Monty Goulet; Devin Hildebrand; Alex Marse; Wyatt O'Connell; Kristen Olsson; Stan Richardson II; Nathan Tellers
- Website: www.electroacousticensemble.org

The Electro-Acoustic Ensemble is a laptop-based ensemble at Loyola University New Orleans. The ensemble was formed in January 2009 by Professor Paul J. Botelho and is composed of thirteen performers. Custom software instruments are developed for the ensemble primarily using the ChucK and Java programming languages. The ensemble focuses on contemporary and classical electro-acoustic works and performs in a variety of situations with a special focus on guerrilla performance.

=== Notable performances ===
Futurist Manifesto was premiered at a guest lecture by philosopher Slavoj Žižek at Loyola University New Orleans on November 17, 2009. The work was based on the manifesto of the Italian Futurists and included live recitation of the manifesto with computer manipulation. This work was also performed at the New Orleans Museum of Art on April 1, 2011, as a part of the museum's Where Y'Art? series.

On December 4, 2009, the ensemble performed a twenty-four-hour meta-performance of Erik Satie's Vexations at Loyola University New Orleans. Notably, one audience member, pianist Michael Bennett, remained for the entire twenty-four-hour performance.

The ensemble performed a concert at McKeown's Books and Difficult Music, New Orleans, LA on March 26, 2011.

== PLOrk ==
The Princeton Laptop Orchestra (abbreviated PLOrk) is an ensemble of computer-based meta-instruments at Princeton University. PLOrk is part of research at Princeton University that investigates ways in which the computer can be integrated into conventional music-making contexts while also radically transforming those contexts. The Princeton Laptop Orchestra is a group of 12–15 persons and uses the “orchestra” (in a very general sense) as a model.

Each PLOrk “instrument” consists of a laptop, a multi-channel hemispherical speaker, and a variety of “control” devices (keyboards, graphics tablets, sensors). The members of this ensemble act as performers, researchers, composers, and software developers.

=== History ===
PLOrk was co-founded in 2005 by professors Perry Cook and Dan Trueman, with graduate students Scott Smallwood and Ge Wang, and funding and support from many Princeton University departments, organizations, and industrial affiliations. Composers and performers from Princeton and elsewhere developed new pieces for the ensemble, including Paul Lansky (Professor of Music at Princeton), Brad Garton (Director of the Columbia Computer Music Center), Pauline Oliveros, PLOrk co-founders Dan Trueman and Perry Cook, Scott Smallwood, Ge Wang, and others. The new PLOrk gave its first performance on April 4, 2006, in Richardson Auditorium, Princeton University. Grammy-winning tabla player Zakir Hussain, renowned accordionist Pauline Oliveros, and So Percussion also performed with the group. PLOrk has since performed at Dartmouth College, the Ear to the Earth festival (produced by the Electronic Music Foundation), ffmup, and elsewhere. Several scholarly articles describing the motivations for establishing such an ensemble, the issues involved in composing for a laptop orchestra, and pedagogical concerns, are currently in press. PLOrk was first presented academically at the 2006 International Computer Music Conference in New Orleans. The guest director of the PLOrk for 2007 was R. Luke DuBois. The group is currently directed by composer and instrument designer Jeff Snyder, who is the Director of Electronic Music at Princeton.

Since the beginning, PLOrk has made extensive use of ChucK, a new music programming language created by Ge Wang and Perry Cook which allows the performers to develop new code both in preparation and in performance, and which serves as a primary teaching tool.

A number of composers from Princeton and elsewhere have been developing pieces for PLOrk that address the unconventional composition of the group. PLOrk works closely with these composers on their pieces with the aim of developing them further and further exploring a new branch of computer music and new media musical composition and performance.

=== Technology ===
Originally, there were 15 PLOrk stations. Each station consists of a laptop with audio software; a rack containing an 8-channel audio amplifier, a power conditioner, and other electronic components; and a custom-made 6-channel hemispherical speaker. In April 2008, PLOrk began using a new hemispherical unit that combined the functionality of the old rack and speakers into one more portable device. The laptops are Apple 12" power books, or more recently, 14" Macbooks. HCI devices include keyboard controllers, TriggerFinger interfaces, graphics tablets, Nintendo Wii remotes, and infrared, light, pressure, and tilt sensors. Additional gear included floor pillows, laptop lapdesk, and gear for transportation.

The PLOrk ensemble uses a variety of commercial and open-source software. Two audio programming languages, ChucK and Max/MSP are primarily used for pedagogy and performance.

== BSBLOrk ==
BSBLOrk
- Origin: Brasília, Distrito Federal, Brasil
- Genres: electro-acoustic music, experimental music
- Years active: 2012–present
- Members: Eufrasio Prates; Anésio Neto; Eduardo Kolody; Elias Nascimento Filho; Joenio Costa'; Philip Jones; Victor Hugo A. Araujo
- Website: https://bsblork.gitlab.io

The Brasília Laptop Orchestra (abbreviated to BSBLOrk) is an ensemble of laptop performers based at Universidade de Brasília, Brasília, Brazil. It was founded by Eufrasio Prates and Eduardo Kolody in 2012, in collaboration with Conrado Silva. It has done many different and multidisciplinary performances and collaborations with dance and video artists.

The Brasília Laptop Orchestra is a group of 5-15 persons and uses the idea of “Orchestra” as a model, with the laptop as main instrument. The members of this ensemble act as performers, researchers, composers. It uses a variety of commercial and open-source software, including HITS, developed by Eufrasio Prates. Its main audio programming language is Max/MSP, but the musicians often use other software and even common instruments in some compositions. BSBLOrks's performances focus on an improvisatory aesthetic, based on the belief that contemporary music should be unpredictable, non-linear and interactive.

It uses hemispherical speakers commissioned by its founders, similar to those used by PLOrk.

=== History ===
BSBLOrk's first performance (August 2012) occurred during one of the city's "Tubo de Ensaios" ("test-tube") experimental performance festivals, and was also the last live performance of Conrado Silva.

BSBLOrk has recently celebrated its 10th year by releasing an album and making a series of online performances.

Throughout the years, BSBLOrk has adopted a critical approach on social and political issues, using samples of political speeches as source.

=== Notable performances ===
BSBLOrk has played in Juca Ferreira nomination, in 2014. BSBLOrk played at NMF2020, Network Music Festival

== See also ==
- Computer music
- Electronic music
- The Hub (band)
- Laptronica
- Laptop battle

== Bibliography ==
- Tsabary Eldad and Woollard Jamie. “Whatever Works”: an Action-Centered Approach to Creation and Mediation in Designing Laptop Orchestra Performances, Gli spazi della musica 3, 2 (2014): 54-70, accessed Jan. 12, 2014 http://www.ojs.unito.it/index.php/spazidellamusica/article/view/818
