= Leaf Trombone: World Stage =

2009 video game

- Developer: Smule
- Publisher: Smule
- Platform: iOS
- Release: April 15, 2009
- Genres: MMO, music
- Modes: Single-player, multiplayer

Leaf Trombone: World Stage was a massively multiplayer online music game for the Apple iOS, developed by Smule and released on April 15, 2009, through the App Store. The game simulates a trombone based on a traditional Chinese leaf instrument, similar to a slide whistle. In the game, players can play the Leaf trombone along to a variety of tunes, as well as compose and publish songs of their own for anyone to play. Along with a "Free Play" mode, the "World Stage" feature provides a venue where players can perform their songs live for a global audience and receive ratings on a 1 to 10 scale from three separate judges. Following each performance, a player's rating is added to their previous ratings creating a comprehensive score reflecting the player's skill within the online community. The creators at Smule claim that Leaf Trombone: World Stage is "an instrument, a game, and a huge global social experience."

== Gameplay ==
Leaf Trombone: World Stage gameplay

The game simulates a trombone based on a traditional Chinese leaf instrument, similar to a slide whistle. The Leaf trombone can be played in two ways. The user must first decide between blowing into the iPhone microphone (or a peripheral microphone if using iPod Touch), or the user can switch on "Touch mode" in the Settings menu, which allows the user to press and play. Once this selection has been made, three modes of play are displayed for the user to choose from, "Play A Song", "World Stage", and "Free Play".

- Play A Song – In this mode, the user selects a song from the integrated song library, which contains all the songs created by users around the world. Once a song has been selected, the Leaf Trombone pops up. Here, a small music wheel plays in the bottom left hand corner, providing background accompaniment and guide leaves that float toward the leaf trombone as the song progresses, showing just where to press along the leaf itself and how long to hold each note.
- World Stage – Once on the World Stage, the user finds a new menu for choosing between judging fellow musicians, performing chosen songs, observing a random performance, viewing player achievements, or checking out the world rankings. By participating more on the World Stage, the player can increase their status as a musician as well as a judge.
- Free Play – Selecting free play provides the user with a place to play without the background accompaniment of the music box and the help of guide leaves.

=== Leaf Trombone Heads Up Display ===
Once a player gets to the instrument screen itself, a number of different elements is presented. Along the right side of the screen, is the Leaf trombone itself with an overlapping indicator for where one's finger is currently sitting on the instrument. As a song plays out, guide leaves of varying colors and length float closer to the trombone directing the player where to place their finger, how long to hold the note, and what key to play. Green leaves represent the base key, whereas blue and red leaves represent higher and lower keys respectively. A set of plus and minus arrows on the screen let one shift keys, they also glow accordingly when a higher or lower scale is required for a specific note. Eight small notches exist along the length of the Leaf Trombone indicating the eight notes on a major scale.

== Reception ==
Leaf Trombone: World Stage was first demonstrated at Apple's iPhone OS 3.0 keynote on March 17, 2009. Co-founder, CTO, and Chief Creative Officer of Smule, Ge Wang presented the application in the form of a duet with another co-worker. Since the games general release on April 15, 2009, it has been received well, earning high marks within the Apple App Store (+4/5), and receiving critical acclaim from sites such as iLounge, PC World, and TechCrunch.
