= Scavone =

Scavone is an Italian surname. Notable people with the surname include:

- Gary Scavone, Canadian academic and musician
- Manuel Scavone (born 1987), Italian footballer
- Myke Scavone (born 1949), American musician
- Oscar Vicente Scavone (born 1955), Paraguayan businessman
