= Electroacoustic =

Electroacoustic or Electroacoustics may refer to:

- Electroacoustics (acoustical engineering), a branch of acoustical engineering
- Electro-acoustic guitar, a type of guitar
- Electroacoustic music, a variety of experimental music

== See also ==
- Electro-Acoustic Ensemble, a laptop-based ensemble at Loyola University New Orleans
