= Ocarina (disambiguation) =

An ocarina is an ancient wind musical instrument.

Ocarina may also refer to:

- Ocarina (app), a music-making app
- The Ocarina, a 1919 German silent film
- Ocarina Networks, a technology company
- Ocarina (Adventure Time), an episode of Adventure Time
- "The Ocarina", a song by Irving Berlin
