= Live PA =

Live performance for electronic dance music

Live PA

Live PA (meaning live public address or live personal appearance) is the act of performing live electronic music in settings typically associated with DJing, such as nightclubs, raves, and more recently dance music festivals.

In a performative context, the term was originally used to refer to live appearances, initially at rave events in the late 1980s, of studio based producers of electronic dance music who released music using fixed media formats such as 12-inch single, CD, or music download. The concept of the live PA helped provide a public face for a scene that was criticized as "faceless" by the mainstream music press. The trend was quickly exploited by a music industry desperate to market dance music to a popular audience.

== Execution ==
Generally, live PA artists and performers use a central sequencer which triggers and controls sound generating devices like synthesizers, drum machines, and digital samplers. The resulting audio outputs of these devices are then mixed and modified with effects using a mixing console. Interconnected drum machines and synthesizers allow the electronic live PA artist to effectively orchestrate a single-person concert. Even though the live PA artist performs alone, they may be triggering a large number of musical parts, including a bassline, drum beats on a drum machine, synthesizer chords, and sampled riffs from other recording.

Live PA artists typically add to these sequenced and triggered parts with hand-played electronic keyboards, hand-triggered audio samples, live vocals/singing, and other live instruments. Some artists like Brian Transeau and Jamie Lidell utilize hardware and software tools custom-designed for live expression and improvisation. By arranging, muting, and cueing pre-composed basic musical data (notes, loops, patterns, and sequences), the live PA artist has the freedom to manipulate major elements of the performance and alter a song's progression in real-time. As such, each performance may be different, as the live PA artist changes the loops and patterns.

Many live PA artists try to combine the qualities of both traditional bands and dancefloor DJs, taking the live music element from bands, and the buildup and progression from song to song of DJs, as well as the sheer volume of music controlled by a single person (of a DJ as opposed to a band).

== From hardware to software ==
Technological progress has kept live PAs evolving to the 2010s. In the 1980s, a live PA artist would need a van full of synthesizer keyboards, drum machines, and large cases of rackmounted effects units. With advances in computer processing power and in software-based audio tools and instruments, the live PA artist in the 2010s can pack a single laptop (loaded with digital audio workstation software and digital effects and mixers) into a bag, go out to a venue that has a house sound reinforcement system and perform a show. This possibility creates a point of discussion, as the ability to perform one's own music live using a single, generic device creates yet another range of performative styles.

On one end, a laptop-based performer has the option of simply playing a polished, premade audio file that she or he prepared in the recording and editing studio. On the other end, the performer can be creating sound completely from scratch using software-based synthesizers, sequencers, etc. Somewhere in the middle is where the majority of performance setups fall. Incredibly popular is the software tool Ableton Live. This gives a laptop-based performing artist the ability to sequence and trigger software synthesizers, external MIDI-controlled instruments, and internally stored sampled audio clips and loops. This can all be achieved in real-time, with the resulting audio being manipulated by Ableton Live's mixer and effect processors.

The feasibility of using a laptop computer as an all-in-one electronic music creation and performance tool created a massive wave of new artists, performers, and performance events. An international contest known as the Laptop Battle has gained momentum.

== Degree of "liveness" ==
A topic of debate amongst listeners, critics, and artists themselves is to what degree a performance is actually "live". A possible determining factor could be the degree to which the performing artist has real-time control over individual elements of the final musical output. Using this criterion, an artist who mimics or mimes the playing of instruments whilst simply having a prerecorded CD or digital audio track sound over the PA system or broadcast, might not be considered particularly "live" by most people.

On the far opposite end of the spectrum, some artists choose to take only an idea or motif (e.g. a bassline, rhythm pattern, or chord progression), realize it from scratch with electronic instruments on-the-spot, and then build upon it, modify it, and continue in this way for the entire performance. This requires a degree of discipline, technical musical skill and creativity to achieve. Additionally, some electronic musicians are also able to play keyboards, percussion and other conventional instruments, and will incorporate instrument playing with live manipulations of samples, effects, and electronics. Such situations meet the criteria of a live musical performance, since physical movements directly affect music.

Some might argue that the visual aspect of a performance, such as the movements of the performer and the light show, would be sufficient to call it "live". Codifying what defines "live" and what does not has been an ongoing topic of debate for many years. To date, nobody has successfully created a definition with which everyone involved seems satisfied.

== See also ==
- Laptop battle
