= Rectangles and Circumstance =

Studio album by Caroline Shaw and So Percussion
- Released: June 14, 2024
- Recorded: August 29 – September 1, 2023
- Studio: Big Mercy Studio, Brooklyn; Figure 8 Recording, Brooklyn; Guilford Sound, Guilford; Princeton University, Princeton
- Length: 44:06
- Label: Nonesuch
- Producer: Jonathan Low

Caroline Shaw chronology
Fleishman Is in Trouble (2022)	Rectangles and Circumstance (2024)	Leonardo da Vinci (2024)

So Percussion chronology
Individuate (2022)	Rectangles and Circumstance (2024)	Jason Treuting: Go Placidly with Haste (2024)

Rectangles and Circumstance is a collaborative album by American classical composer Caroline Shaw and percussion quartet So Percussion. It was released on June 14, 2024, by Nonesuch Records.

== Reception ==
Professional ratings
Review scores
Source	Rating
AllMusic	4.5/5 stars
The Guardian	4/5 stars
PopMatters	8/10 stars
Spectrum Culture	79/100

Music review website AllMusic wrote about the album, stating "it's hard to imagine that Rectangles and Circumstance won't lead to even more demand for the alliance's concerts." Andrew Clements of the Guardian, in his review of Rectangles and Circumstance, stated "the melodic lines that Shaw adds above them belong to a very different musical world and, as in everything here, the results are never quite what you might expect," while Gramophone described it as "a more personal album, but these private testimonies are witnessed through shared experience rather than self-reflection." PopMatters gave the album a rating of eight stars, and remarked "Rectangles and Circumstance has a slightly harsher edge than the earthier, more ambient Let the Soil Play Its Simple Part, and the textures and complexity of this new album often result in an experience that begs for repeated listens." Spectrum Culture referred to it as "a rich and boundary-pushing album that navigates the musical question of what a “song” can be."

== Track listing ==
No.	Title	Length
1.	"Rectangles and Circumstance"	2:55
2.	"Sing On"	3:48
3.	"Silently Invisibly"	4:08
4.	"And So"	5:27
5.	"The Parting Glass"	5:44
6.	"Slow Motion"	4:01
7.	"Who Turns Out the Light"	5:24
8.	"Like a Drum"	3:58
9.	"This"	2:45
10.	"To Music"	5:56
Total length:		44:06
