= Caroline Shaw =

American composer (born 1982)

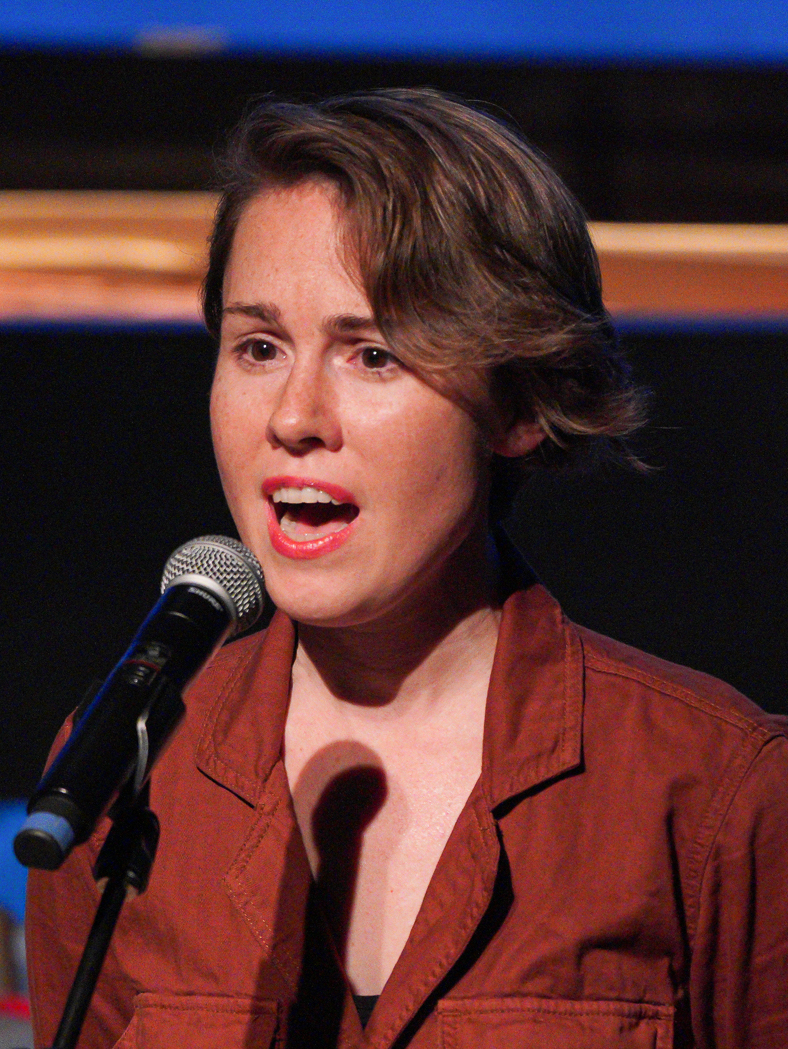
- Shaw in 2020
- Born: Caroline Adelaide Shaw; August 1, 1982 (age 44); Greenville, North Carolina, U.S.
- Education: Rice University (BM); Yale University (MM); Princeton University (PhD)
- Occupations: Composer; violinist; singer
- Works: List of compositions
- Website: carolineshaw.com

Caroline Adelaide Shaw (born August 1, 1982) is an American composer of contemporary classical music, violinist, and singer. She is a founding member of the vocal ensemble Roomful of Teeth. In 2013 she won the Pulitzer Prize for Music for her a cappella piece Partita for 8 Voices, and received the 2022 Grammy Award for Best Contemporary Classical Composition for her Narrow Sea. She also won the 2025 Grammy Award for Best Chamber Music/Small Ensemble Performance for her Rectangles and Circumstance.

== Early life and education ==
Caroline Adelaide Shaw was born on August 1, 1982, in Greenville, North Carolina. At two years old, Shaw began playing the violin, being initially taught the Suzuki method by her mother Jon, a violinist and singer. Early influences included the choir of her local Episcopal church and the organist there who frequently played Bach. NPR's Elena Saavedra Buckley notes that Shaw's "personal place of worship was in front of her Sony boombox radio. She would call into the classical station and request a piece — a duet from The Magic Flute, say — and get ready to record it on cassette when it came on. If they aired the wrong duet, she would call back and correct them." She began writing music when she was 10 years old, mostly in imitation of the chamber music of Mozart and Brahms.

At university, her main focus was on violin performance, aiming to become an orchestral or chamber musician. Shaw received her Bachelor of Music (violin performance) from Rice University in 2004. She received the Thomas J. Watson Fellowship in 2004/5. After returning from the Watson fellowship, Shaw completed a master's degree (violin) from Yale University in 2007. She entered the PhD program in composition in Princeton University in 2010.

== Career ==
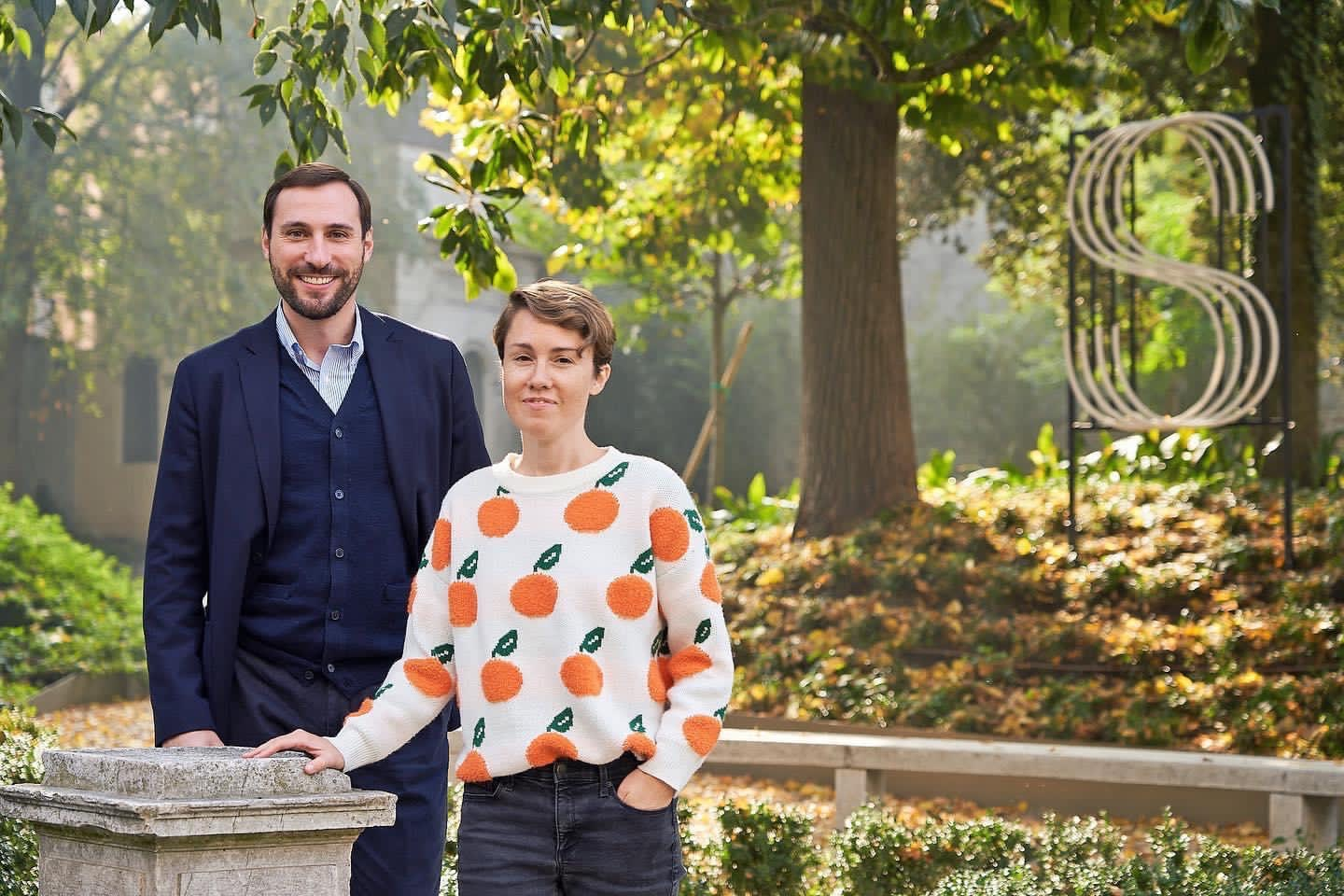
Paolo Petrocelli with Caroline Shaw at Stauffer Center for Strings in Cremona, 2022

Shaw is a composer of contemporary classical music, violinist, and singer. She is a founding member of the vocal ensemble Roomful of Teeth, which formed in 2009.

At 30, Shaw became the youngest recipient of the Pulitzer Prize for Music for her composition Partita for 8 Voices. The jury citation praised the composition as "a highly polished and inventive a cappella work uniquely embracing speech, whispers, sighs, murmurs, wordless melodies and novel vocal effects." The work comprises four movements inspired by baroque dance forms: Allemande, Sarabande, Courante and Passacaglia. A recording of the work was released by New Amsterdam Records on October 30, 2012, performed by the ensemble Roomful of Teeth (including Shaw). According to Steven Mackey, chair of the Department of Music at Princeton, this is the first Pulitzer Prize awarded to a member of the department. (Milton Babbitt was awarded a Pulitzer citation in 1982 for his life's work as a composer.) Shaw appeared as herself in season 4 of the Amazon Prime series Mozart in the Jungle, for a story line that involved a main character seeking to premiere her piece "Hi" in a competition for conductors. The piece was also played live at the series' release party, with Shaw conducting.

Shaw is also known as a performing musician. She performs as violinist with the American Contemporary Music Ensemble (ACME) and as vocalist with Roomful of Teeth. As a performer, she has also worked with the Trinity Wall Street Choir, Alarm Will Sound, Attacca Quartet, So Percussion, Wordless Music Orchestra, Ensemble Signal, AXIOM, The Yehudim, Victoire, Opera Cabal, the Mark Morris Dance Group Ensemble, Hotel Elefant, the Oracle Hysterical, Red Light New Music, and Robert Mealy's Yale Baroque Ensemble.

Shaw was the musician in residence at Dumbarton Oaks during the fall of 2014, and was composer in residence with Music on Main in Vancouver, British Columbia, Canada through 2016, and she has said that The Evergreen was inspired by a particular tree in Bluffs Park, Galiano Island.

Shaw's works have been performed by Roomful of Teeth, Sō Percussion, the Brentano String Quartet, yMusic, and the Brooklyn Youth Chorus. Shaw has been a Yale Baroque Ensemble fellow and a Rice University Goliard fellow. In 2016, the Baltimore Symphony Orchestra commissioned and premiered Shaw's The Baltimore Bomb as part of the orchestra's centennial celebration.

=== Concert works ===
In 2018, the BBC with Coretet, The Phillips Collection, the Royal Philharmonic Society and the University of Delaware commissioned Shaw to write two works, Second Essay: Echo and Third Essay: Ruby. These received their world premiere, performed by the Calidore String Quartet, at the Cadogan Hall, London on July 16, 2018, in the BBC Proms, where they followed her 2016 work First Essay: Nimrod. According to Shaw, Nimrod was composed while listening to a recording of Marilynne Robinson's book The Givenness of Things and then in the 2016 US presidential election, which she stated accounted for the "disintegration of elements" in the piece. Shaw stated that Echo alluded to the 'echo' function in the PHP programming language, as well as to physical echoes, while Ruby is named for the Ruby programming language as well as for the gemstone.

Byron Schenkman & Friends (renamed Sound Salon) commissioned Caroline Shaw's Concerto for Harpsichord and Strings to mark their 10th anniversary season. The work was premiered on March 26, 2023, with Byron Schenkman performing, at Benaroya Hall in Seattle, WA.

=== Music for film and television ===
Shaw has written some music for film and television. Her film credits include To Keep the Light and the 2018 feature film, Madeline's Madeline. She also wrote music for the 2022 TV series Fleishman Is in Trouble.

Some of her music has been included in the soundtracks of other films. In Manus Tuas, performed by Clarice Jensen, features in the 2018 film The Miseducation of Cameron Post. The third movement of Partita for 8 Voices, "III. Courante", performed by Roomful of Teeth, is used in the 2022 film Tár.

Shaw was nominated for an Emmy for the music she wrote for Ken Burns' PBS documentary series, Leonardo da Vinci (2024).

=== Musical collaborations ===
In October 2015, rapper Kanye West released a remix of "Say You Will", the opening track from his 2008 album, 808s & Heartbreak. The remix, co-produced by Caroline Shaw, features vocals from Shaw similar to her classical compositions. She also features on "Wolves" and contributed vocals to "Father Stretch My Hands Pt. 2", both from West's seventh studio album, The Life of Pablo. Shaw also contributed vocals to a leaked version of "Only One" that appeared on the internet in February 2016.

In the early 2020s, Shaw joined with singer/songwriter Danni Lee to form Ringdown, "an electronic cinematic pop duo". Their album Lady on the Bike was released by Nonesuch in 2025.

Shaw arranged several tracks on Rosalía's 2025 album Lux.

Shaw served as vocal arranger for several tracks on Phoebe Bridgers’ 2026 album Lost Weekend.

== Discography ==
=== Albums ===
Title	Year	Record label
Evergreen	2022	Nonesuch Records
The Wheel	2022	Alpha Classics
Let the Soil Play Its Simple Part	2021	Nonesuch Records
Narrow Sea	2021	Nonesuch Records
Orange	2019	Nonesuch Records
How to fold the Wind	2025	Cantaloupe Music

=== Featured artist ===
List of singles as a featured artist
Title	Year	Peak chart positions	Album
Title	Year	US Hot 100	Album
"Pt. 2" (Kanye West featuring Desiigner and Caroline Shaw)	2016	54	The Life of Pablo

=== Guest appearances ===
List of non-single guest appearances, with other performing artists, showing year released and album name
Title	Year	Other artist(s)	Album
"Say You Will" (remix)	2015	Kanye West	Non-album song
"Only One" (original demo)	2015	Kanye West	Non-album song
"FML"	2016	Kanye West, The Weeknd	The Life of Pablo
"Wolves"	2016	Kanye West, Vic Mensa, Sia	The Life of Pablo
"Freestyle 4"	2016	Kanye West, Desiigner	The Life of Pablo
"No Mistakes"	2018	Kanye West, Kid Cudi, Charlie Wilson	Ye
"Everything"	2018	Nas, The-Dream, Kanye West, Tony Williams, 070 Shake	Nasir
"Take Me to the Light"	2019	Francis and the Lights, Bon Iver, Kanye West, Chance the Rapper	Take Me to the Light

== Awards and nominations ==
Year	Award	Category	Work	Result	Ref.
2013	Pulitzer Prize for Music		Partita for 8 Voices	Won	
2014	Grammy Award	Best Classical Contemporary Composition	Partita for 8 Voices	Nominated	
2014	Grammy Award	Best Chamber Music/Small Ensemble Performance	Roomful of Teeth	Won	
2016	Grammy Award	Best Chamber Music/Small Ensemble Performance	Render	Nominated	
2020	Grammy Award	Best Classical Contemporary Composition	Orange	Nominated	
2020	Grammy Award	Best Chamber Music/Small Ensemble Performance	Orange	Won	
2022	Grammy Award	Best Classical Contemporary Composition	Narrow Sea	Won	
2024	Grammy Award	Best Chamber Music/Small Ensemble Performance	Rough Magic	Won	
2024	Primetime Emmy Award	Outstanding Music Composition for a Documentary Series or Special (Original Dramatic Score)	Leonardo da Vinci	Nominated	
2025	Grammy Award	Best Chamber Music/Small Ensemble Performance	Rectangles and Circumstance	Won	
2026	Tony Award	Best Original Score	Death of a Salesman	Nominated	
2027	Grammy Award	Best Arrangement, Instruments and Vocals	The Governor's Waltz (Phoebe Bridgers)	Nominated	
