= To the Hands =

2016 musical composition by Caroline Shaw

- by Caroline Shaw
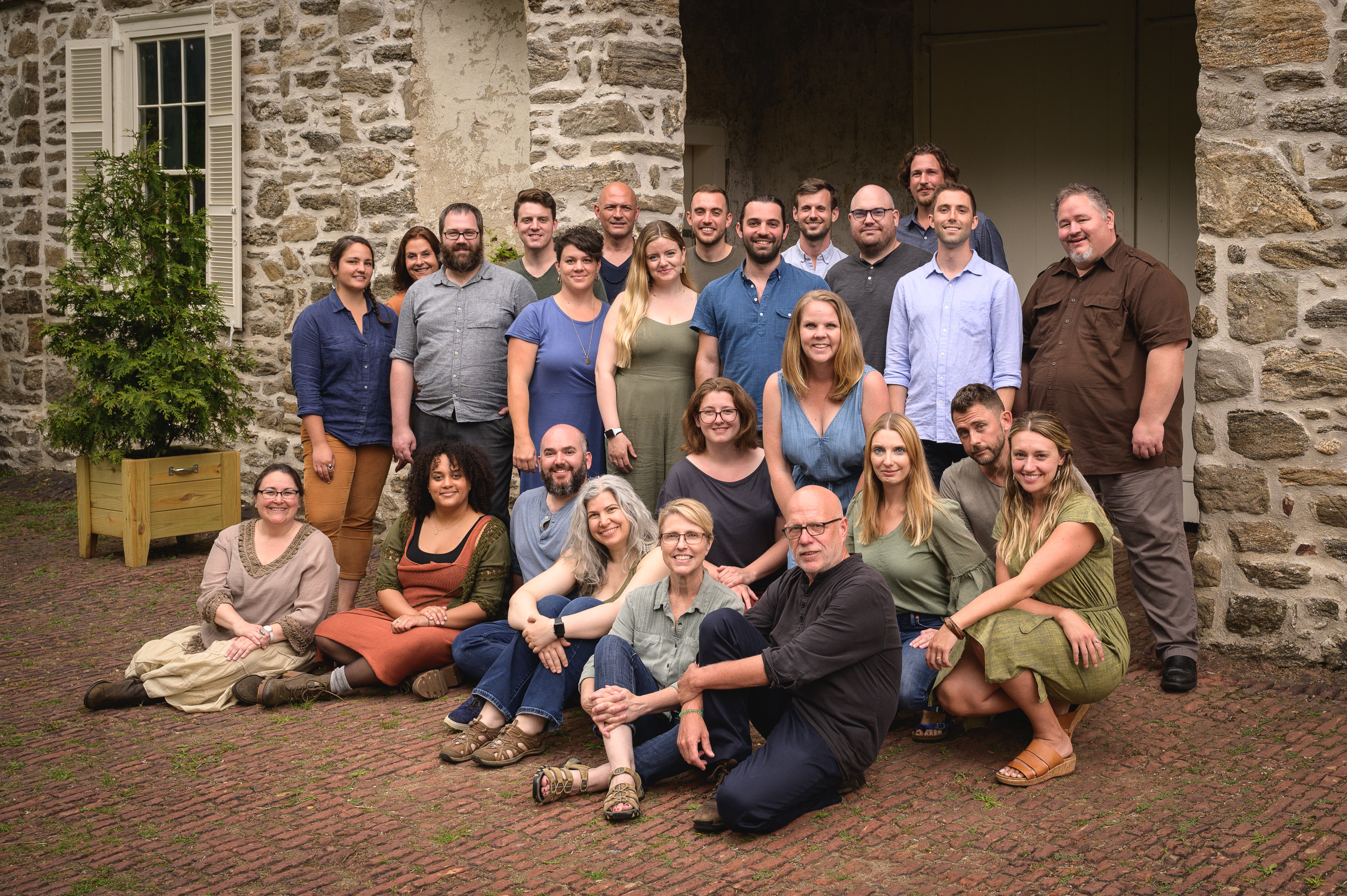
- The Crossing, a commissioner of the work c. 2021
- Genre: Contemporary classical music
- Commissioned by: The Crossing, Donald Nally, Pew Center for Arts & Heritage
- Text: Membra Jesu Nostri, The New Colossus, Internal Displacement Monitoring Centre data
- Language: English, Latin
- Duration: 19 minutes
- Movements: Six
- Scoring: String quintet and Choir

Premiere
- Date: June 24, 2016
- Location: Philadelphia, Pennsylvania
- Performers: The Crossing, International Contemporary Ensemble, Quicksilver Baroque Ensemble

To the Hands is a six movement piece by American contemporary composer Caroline Shaw which first premiered on June 24, 2016, in Philadelphia, Pennsylvania. Commissioned by The Crossing, who would later premier the work, the piece is intended as a reply to the third cantata, Ad manus, of Membra Jesu Nostri composed by Dieterich Buxtehude in 1680. The name of the piece is a translation of said cantata.

== Composition ==
The piece is written for SATB Choir with accompaniment by a string quintet of 2 violins, viola, cello, and double bass. As Membra Jesu Nostri is based on different body parts, Ad manus—"To the hands" in English—is specifically about Jesus' crucified hands. While other movements quote and respond to other texts, movement 5 specifically discusses refugee crises. The piece contains uses of string harmonics and extended technique, as well as polyrhythms. Its choral writing has also been compared to Gregorian chant, and portions of the piece have been paraphrased from Membra Jesu Nostri.

== Movements ==
The work is in six movements.

1. Prelude (attacca)
2. in medio/in the midst
3. Her beacon-hand beckons
4. ever ever ever
5. Litany of the Displaced
6. i will hold you

=== I. Prelude ===
The movement contains no actual text and uses the syllables "ah, oh, oo, nn, mm," and "na'n'n..." The piece ends with an attacca into movement 2.

=== II. in medio/in the midst ===
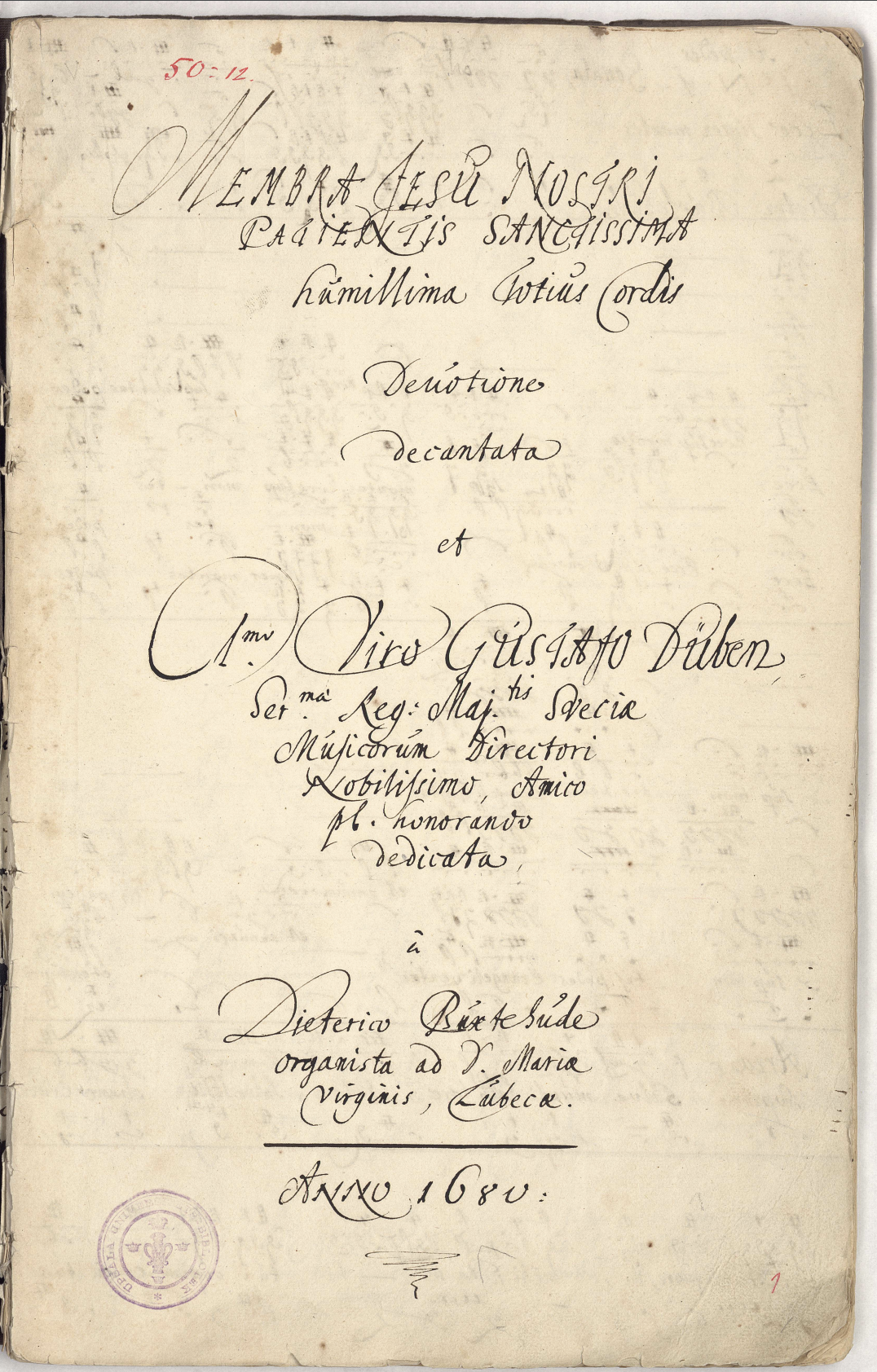
Cover page of Membra Jesu Nostri, after which Shaw based 3 movements of her work

Contains text of Ad manus and from Membra Jesu Nostri which have been arranged by the composer, in addition to the line in medio manuum nostrarum, which itself is a quotation of Zechariah 13:6.

=== III. Her beacon-hand beckons ===
Contains quotations of "The New Colossus" by Emma Lazarus and additional text as a response by the composer. The movement is without string accompaniment.

=== IV. ever ever ever ===
Contains text from the composer describing separate scenes, and the movement's final lines are taken from Dieterich Buxtehude's Ad latus.

=== V. Litany of the Displaced ===
This movement uses the Internal Displacement Monitoring Centre's data from 2015 on displaced persons by country and in ascending order, with the smallest number being 224 and largest at 7.6 million from Syria. The choir shouts figures of displacement while accompanied by arpeggiated strings with the exception of the contrabass, which is absent in this movement.

=== VI. i will hold you ===
The text reprises portions of Zechariah 13:6 from movement 2.
