= Plants used as musical instruments =

Use of live plants in music

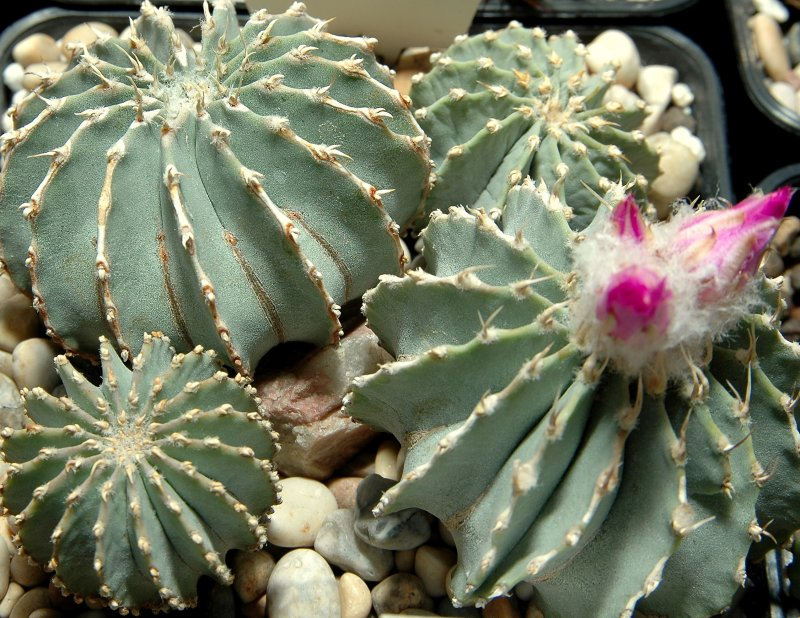

Live plants have been used as musical instruments, especially in electronic music.

Live plants can be used as electronic musical instrument by running a weak electric current through them and by amplifying the way the current is changed when the plants are touched, or by applying contact microphones and amplifying the projection and tone of the sounds produced when handling them.

John Cage composed Child of Tree (1975) and Branches (1976) for what he described as "amplified plant materials". Cage was a proponent of chance music and felt that the organic nature of music without man-made instruments was very strong and influential. The percussion group So Percussion gave a concert in 2007 featuring Cage's pieces, where percussionist "Jason Treuting played an amplified cactus, running his hand over the plant's unfriendly spikes to produce an alluring sound like a babbling brook."

Another piece for amplified cactus is Degrees of Separation "Grandchild of Tree" by Paul Rudy which received mention at the Bourges International Competition for Electroacoustic Music in 2000. Rudy mentions in his own program notes:

The idea for a cactus and tape work came about when I heard a performance of John Cage's Child of Tree. I was immediately taken with the sound of the cactus in particular. Taken from its natural environment and placed in the confined and groomed existence of a pot, amplified with a contact microphone, the cactus took on a completely new and interesting character...

A piece by Mark Andre, ...zu Staub... also features three amplified cacti alongside classical instruments.

In 2007, the French digital artist duo Scenocosme created a sound installation where visitors create sounds by touching the leaves of plants in pots hanging from the ceiling.
