= Dan Trueman =

Dan Trueman is a composer, fiddle player, improviser, new instrument creator and software designer. He plays the violin and the Norwegian Hardanger fiddle. Trueman studied physics at Carleton College in Northfield, Minnesota, composition and theory at the University of Cincinnati College-Conservatory of Music in Cincinnati and composition at Princeton University. He taught composition at Columbia, Colgate, and since 2002, at Princeton. As a performer, Trueman has played at both contemporary and folk music festivals, among them Bang on a Can and Den Norske Folkemusikkveka. Trueman has written for his own ensembles, Interface (which also includes Curtis Bahn and Tomie Hahn) and the Princeton Laptop Orchestra (also known as PLOrk, which he co-founded with Perry Cook), as well as the Brentano, Daedalus, Cassatt and Amernet string quartets, Non Sequitur, So Percussion and others. He has received awards from the Guggenheim (2006) and MacArthur Foundations (2008 Digital Media and Learning Award).

== Discography ==
- Trollstilt, Trollstilt, Azalea City Records, 2000
- ./swank, interface, c74 Records, 2001
- Machine Language, Bridge Records, 2004
- Five (and-a-half) Gardens, So Percussion and Trollstilt, New Amsterdam Records, 2008
- Unpacking the Trailer, QQQ, New Amsterdam Records, 2009
- CrissCross (with Brittany Haas), Many Arrows Music, 2012
- Neither Anvil Nor Pulley, So Percussion, Cantaloupe Music, 2013
- Laghdú (with Caoimhín Ó Raghallaigh), IrishMusic.net Records, 2014
- The Fate of Bones (with Caoimhín Ó Raghallaigh), IrishMusic.net Records, 2022
