= Ocarina (app) =

App by Smule

Ocarina (2008) is an app by Smule. It was followed by Ocarina 2 (2012). Both apps were designed by Ge Wang.

== Background ==
The app "lets users create their own 'music' by blowing into their iDevice's microphone and then creating different tones by holding fingers". Ocarina 2 features include dynamic harmony and a 'Whistle Mode'.

== Critical reception ==
Wired rated it 7/10, though noted "There's a thin line between "spirit stirring" and "annoying droning." " Appstruck gave the app 5 out of 5 stars, writing "Granted I have access to a wonderfully astute and adept guitar player (hello, boyfriend), I'll still try to wear callouses on my fingers and learn to play a live acoustic, but on my own time, the Ocarina is a fun and pleasant-sounding instrument that allows even the talentless, the musically-deficient, to produce harmonious melodies all on their own." 10TopTenReviews said "Ocarina is a worthy addition to your iPhone's app library. It won't be an application that you'll quickly tire of like the simplified drums, piano and guitar apps littering the App Store on iTunes. You can actually create and perform real music." Macworld gave it 4.5 out of 5, writing "If you'd like to help in the effort to make more accomplished Ocarina players, start by dropping the $1 necessary to pick up an Ocarina of your own. If you have even the slightest interest in making music with your iPhone, this is a must-have application."

QuickAppReview rated Ocarina 2 a 9 out of 10, describing it as "innovative" and "authentic".

== Ocarina 2 ==
While the original version of the app let people create their own songs, the new, Ocarina 2, allows them to recreate well-known tunes. The app allows people to see how many notes they have played, how many "breath points" they have earned and what their progress looks like. Users who have mastered more than 100 songs can reach a Jedi status.

== See also ==
- List of music software
