= Walter Thompson (composer) =

American experimental saxophonist and pianist

- Born: May 31, 1952 (age 74); West Palm Beach, Florida, U.S.
- Genres: experimental music, avant-garde jazz, free jazz, free improvisation
- Occupations: Composer; musician; educator
- Instruments: Piano, woodwinds, percussion
- Years active: 1974–present
- Labels: Dane Records, Newport Classic, Knitting Factory Works, Nine Winds Records, Novodisc Recordings, Scratchy Records, Kreating SounD, Right Brain Records
- Member of: The Walter Thompson Orchestra,
- Website: soundpainting.com wtosp.org

Walter Thompson (born May 31, 1952, in West Palm Beach, Florida) is a composer, pianist, saxophonist, percussionist, and educator, also known for creating the multidisciplinary live composing sign language, Soundpainting.

== Early life ==
The son of a visual artist, Walter Thompson began learning the piano in his early years. At the age of 18, he entered the Berklee School of Music first in the performance program and then in the private study department. Among other things, he studied the Graphic notation of Robert Moran. After receiving a grant from the National Endowment of the Arts, he moved to Woodstock where he studied composition and woodwind with Anthony Braxton for 8 years. He also studied percussion with Bob Moses and modern dance and acting with Ruth Ingalls at the Woodstock Playhouse. Thompson also occasionally collaborated with the Creative Music Studio founded by Karl Berger.

== Soundpainting ==
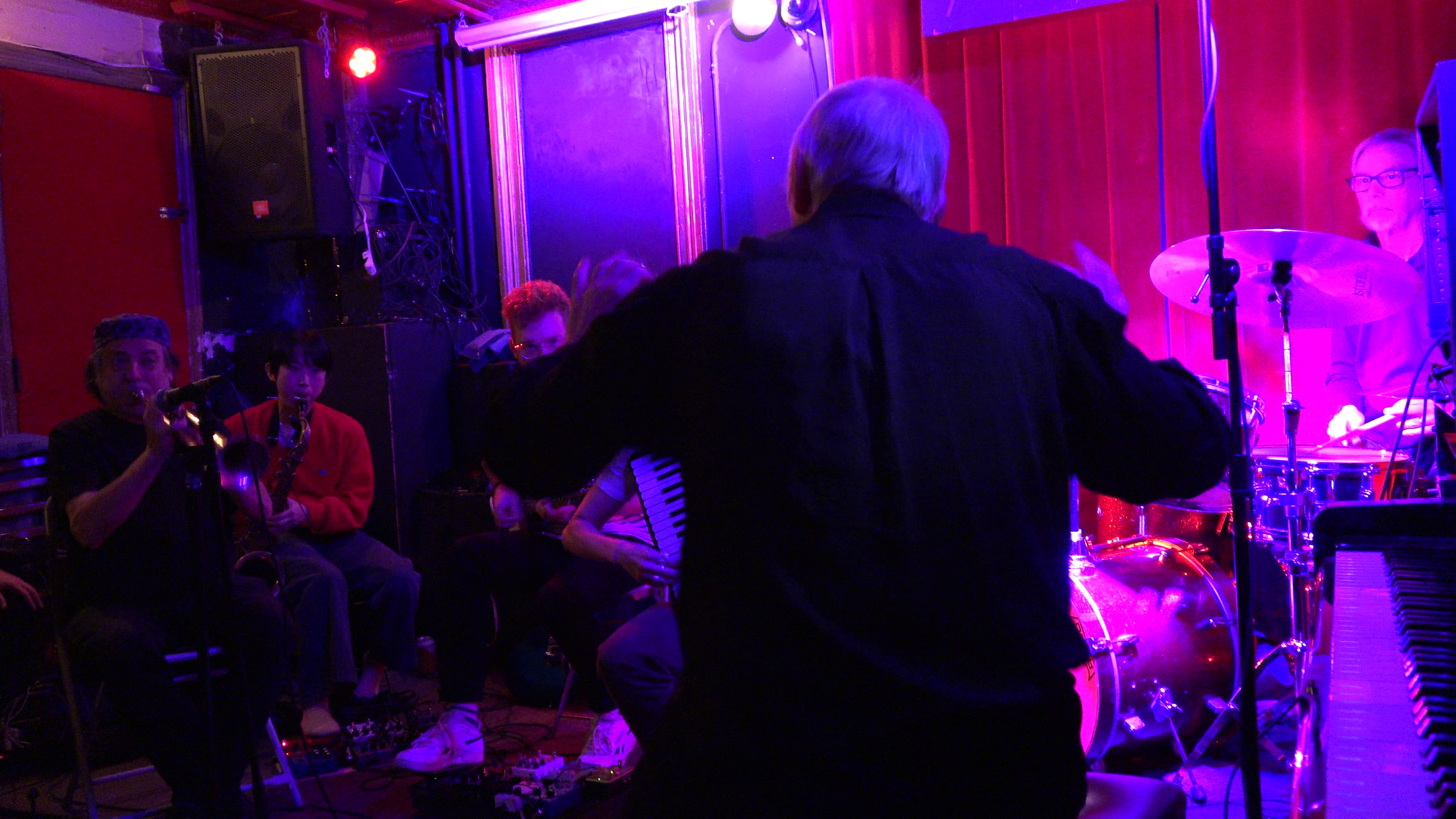
Thompson soundpainting in NYC in 2024

Soundpainting is a multi-disciplinary live-composing sign language for varied kinds of artists (musicians, actors, dancers, visual artists…). In the summer of 1974, he invited 25 musicians from the Creative Music Studio and 7 dancers from the Woodstock Playhouse to gather and form a multi-disciplinary orchestra. This orchestra gave birth to a primary form of Soundpainting, which would take years to evolve into a full-fledged language. The name "Soundpainting" comes from Thompson's brother Charles, who, after attending a concert, noticed similarities between the physical attitude of Thompson conducting his orchestra and their father's physical attitude to his paintings.

He formed his own orchestra (the Walter Thompson Orchestra) in 1984 to promote his own compositions and explorations with Soundpainting. At the same time, he collaborated with numerous ensembles such as the Irondale Ensemble Project as a musician and/or composer.

In 2001 Thompson won a Sebastià Gasch FAD Award for Soundpainting for "creating a ritual of musical, instrumental and vocal improvisation that involves performers and subsequently the audience through a code of gestures capable of mixing qualities, frequencies, volumes and all types of nuances, and which ends up creating a highly effective physical and sensorial effect."

== Influences ==
Thompson has been mostly influenced by Cecil Taylor and Marilyn Crispell as a pianist. As a composer he cites his primary influences as Anthony Braxton and Charles Ives.

== Composing ==
About his work as a composer, Jon Pareles, the chief popular music critic in the arts section of The New York Times stated "Thompson writes for big band with a modern classical composer's ambitions - to stretch melody and harmony and to construct new forms. Now and then, he also wants the music to swing.[...] his compositions push big-band music in new directions."

== Collaborative work ==
As well as composing classical music, Thompson has been involved in musical comedy. In 1998, he collaborated with the Irondale Ensemble Project on the play Degenerate Art, for which he wrote the entire musical score. He was also present on stage, using soundpainting to compose live with the audience. In composing this piece, he drew inspiration from the spoken-sung cabarets of Kurt Weill and Bertolt Brecht. He taught Soundpainting for children with the same ensemble until the 2010s.

Over the course of his career, he has shared the stage with numerous musicians and artists such as George Cartwright, Tom Varner, Roy Campbell Jr.

Thompson has composed soundpainting pieces with many contemporary orchestras in many cities around the world, including Barcelona, Paris, New York, Chicago, Los Angeles, Boston, Oslo, Berlin, Bergen, Lucerne, Copenhagen, and Reykjavik, among others, and has taught Soundpainting at the Conservatoire de Paris; Eastman School of Music; Iceland Academy of the Arts; University of Michigan; Grieg Academy in Bergen, Norway; University of Iowa; Oberlin College Conservatory of Music; and New York University, among many others.

== Selected recordings ==
1970-1980:

- Four Compositions with Walter Thompson and Anthony Braxton (Dane Records, recorded at Grog Kill Studio, Willow, N.Y., 1977)
- Stardate, Walter Thompson (Dane Records, Recorded at Intermix Studio, Los Angeles, California, 1980).

1980-1990:

- ARC Quartet, ARC Quartet: Walter Thompson, Steve Rust, Harvey Sorgen and Robert Windbiel (Recorded at Dane Studios, Woodstock, N.Y., Dane Records, 1981)
- 520 OUT, The Walter Thompson Ensemble (Recorded at Classic Sound, NYC, December 16, 1984 - February 2 and March 16, 1985, Dane Records, 1985).

1990-2000:

- Not for Rollo, The Walter Thompson Big Band (Ottava Records, 1990).
- Symphony of the Universe, Wendy Mae Chambers and the Walter Thompson Orchestra (Newport Classic, 1993)
- John Zorn's Cobra: Live at the Knitting Factory, John Zorn (Knitting Factory Works, 1995)
- The Colonel, The Walter Thompson Orchestra (Recorded at Kampo Studio, Nine Winds Records, 1998).
- New York Soundpainting Orchestra, with Soundpainter's Walter Thompson and Evan Mazunik (Recorded in New York City, Dane Recordings, 1998)

2000-2010:

- PEXO-A Soundpainting Symphony (Nine Winds Records, recorded at Clinton Recording Studio, 2001).
- Soundpainting Haydn, Gil Selinger (cello) and Walter Thompson (Soundpainter) (Novodisc Recordings, 2006)
- Side Show Tim, Walter Thompson (Soundpainter) (Recorded at the University of Iowa, Dane Recordings, 2006)
- Code of the West, Joe Gallant & Illuminati with Walter Thompson (Alto Saxophone) (Scratchy Records, 2007)
- Steve Rust Soundpainting Sextet, Steve Rust's ensemble with Walter Thompson as Soundpainter (Dane Recordings, 2007)

2010-2020:

- Twin Seasons, Walter Thompson and SP4tet: Olivia de Prato, David Grunberg, Lev Zhurbin, Gil Selinger (Dane Recordings, 2010)
- Six Soundpainting Compositions with Anthony Braxton, Walter Thompson and the Walter Thompson Orchestra (Recorded at the Irondale Center, Brooklyn, New York, 2010)
- Walter Thompson/Olle Karlsson Duo (Recorded in Helsingborg, Sweden, Dane Recordings, 2012)

2020-nowadays:

- Ascending Structure, Summit Quartet (with Mark Harris, Matt Smiley, and Ron Coulter), (Recorded December 29, 2021 in Denver, CO, Kreating SounD, 2022)
- New Air, Summit Quartet (with Mark Harris, Matt Smiley, and Ron Coulter) (Right Brain Records, 2022)
- Business, Summit Quartet (with Mark Harris, Matt Smiley, and Ron Coulter (Recorded January 7, 2023 in Denver, CO, Kreating SounD, 2022)
- Lost While Found, SeFa LoCo + Thompson (Recorded January 7, 2023 at Mighty Fine Productions in Denver, CO, Kreating SounD, 2023)
- What Can We Say?, SeFa LoCo + Thompson (Recorded January 7, 2023 at Mighty Fine Productions in Denver, CO, Right Brain Records, 2023)
- Run With It, SeFa LoCo + Thompson (Recorded January 7, 2023 at Mighty Fine Productions in Denver, CO, Kreating SounD, 2024)
- Process, Summit Quartet (with Mark Harris, Matt Smiley, and Ron Coulter), Kreating SounD 2024
- Hibiscus, Walter Thompson, Matt Smiley & Ron Coulter (Recorded January 18, 2024 at Colorado Sound Studio in Westminster, CO, Kreating SounD, 2024)
- The Way of Things, Walter Thompson, Matt Smiley & Ron Coulter (Recorded January 18, 2024 at Colorado Sound Studio in Westminster, CO, Kreating SounD, 2025)
- STRATA, SeFa LoCo (Bret Sexton, Farrell Lowe, Matt Smiley, Ron Coulter) Right Brain Records 2026

== Selected publications ==
- Soundpainting Workbook 1 – The Art of Live Composing for Musicians (Level 1).
- Soundpainting Workbook 2 - The Art of Live Composing for Musicians (Level 2).
- Soundpainting Workbook 3 – The Art of Live Composing for Actors and Dancers (Levels 1 and 2).
- Colors for Chorus – Boosey and Hawkes.
- Introduction to Soundpainting – Eufonia Núm.047 (in Spanish).
