= Minouk Lim =

South Korean multimedia artist and documentary filmmaker

- Born: 1968 (age 57–58)
- Education: École nationale supérieure des Beaux-Arts, Paris
- Website: minouklim.com

Minouk Lim (born 1968) is a South Korean multimedia artist, and documentary filmmaker. She has had exhibitions at such institutes as National Museum of Fine Arts, Los Angeles County Museum of Art, The Museum of Fine Arts, Houston, Walker Art Center, and the Tamayo Contemporary Art Museum.

== Early life and education ==
Lim was born in Daejeon, South Korea. At a young age, Lim moved to Seoul. She entered an art competition sponsored by the Little Angels where she was given an award as well as a scholarship for the art school. She enrolled at Ewha Womans University in 1985 to study painting. Lim became dissatisfied with the school and left during her last year. She, then, studied at École nationale supérieure des Beaux-Arts in Paris.

== Career ==
Lim started showing her work in South Korea in the late 1990s. In 1998, she created the installation Bus Stop for the exhibition City and Image: Food, Clothing, Shelter. The work was centered around the bus stop billboards in South Korea after the 1997 Asian financial crisis. Many of the billboards were left blank. Lim placed non-commercial images in the billboards with the attempt to draw attention to the types of images consumed by the public.

Lim's video work New Ghost Town (2005) focuses on Yeongdeungpo and the redevelopment project set in place by the Seoul Metropolitan Government. The New Ghost Town was a single-channel video that publicized her as an artist. She explored the idea of solitude, solidarity and the individuals of each other in South Korea. With the video taken place in Yeongdeungpo, a lot of representation was shown. Redevelopment was taken place by the former Seoul mayor Lee Myung-back under his failed new town policy. The redevelopment was promoted to improve standards of living, but it displaced many existing residents. In the video, a slam poet shouts lines such as, "Oh, my complex... Oh my housing commercial complex... I have nowhere to go. I'm a new-town ghost."

S.O.S-Adoptive Dissensus (2009) is a site-specific video work by Lim; it chronicles a ferry's trip down the Han River. The ferry passes three different events, protesters resisting urban development around the river, lovers taunting the ferry, and a political prisoner signaling S.O.S.

Lim received residency from Hyde Park Art Center in 2013; she worked on the project, FireCliff 4_Chicago, during her one-month residency. She collaborated on the project with the Chicago-based organist Chris Foreman.

=== Themes ===
Much of Lim's work is concerned with the silent or invisible aspects of various topics such as, industrialization and language. Some of her work investigates concepts of language, its fragile nature, and miscommunication. Her work is critical of society's rapid development and its impact on political and social aspects of life as well as the personal displacement and loss one feels in an urban environment.

Lim developed a body of work that critiques the social and political conditions of a contemporary society fueled by growth and development. She calls it "the ghosts of modernization," in which she responds to the loss of belonging and place. Her work is displayed with the lines of aesthetics and politics. And in recent years, Lim discovered a distinct visual language that combines her interest in performance, video and documentary.

Lim has the ability to take mass media and subculture in her art to challenge her audiences about the history of South Korea. She brings forth a revolutionary aspect for the social change in which she internalizes criticism. In which she attacks modern culture, social constructs, historical loss and loss memories. By doing so, she retains her revolutionary mindset through tactics in video image. Her videos are not only documentaries, but videos that are staged performances. In which her style is shown in her work The Weight of Hands in 2010.

Her work often explores the idea that the impossible can be made possible. She approaches communication through the notion that everything can “speak,” while also acknowledging that some things remain unsayable. Through this perspective, she aims to convey her thoughts freely to audiences, including the ability to refuse or say no.

=== Major exhibitions ===
- Jump Cut, ArtSonje Center, Seoul, Korea 2008
- Liquide Commune_Minouk Lim, PKM Gallery, Seoul, Korea 2011
- Perspective, Freer/Sakler Gallery_Smithsonian Museum, Washington D.C, U.S.A 2011
- Minouk Lim: Heat of Shadows, Walker Art Center, Minneapolis, U.S.A 2012
- Hyde Park Art Center Residency Program, Chicago, U.S.A 2013
- Navigation ID, 10th Gwangju Biennale, Korea 2014
- FireCliff5, Minouk Lim solo exhibition, PORTIKUS, Frankfurt, Germany 2015
- Minouk LIM solo exhibition, PLATEAU, Seoul, Korea 2015
- From X to A, Community-Performativity Project, Asia Culture Complex, Gwangju, Korea 2015

=== Awards and nominations ===
- Albert Rocheron Foundation Prize, Paris, France 1995
- Gwangju Biennale Gwangju Bank Prize, Korea 2006
- Hermès Foundation Missulsang, Seoul, Korea 2007
- Media Art Korea Award, Seoul, Korea 2010
