= Soundpainting =

Sign language for the live-composition

Soundpainting is a universal multi-disciplinary live-composing sign language for every kind of artist (musicians, actors, dancers, visual artists), and is still evolving since its creation in 1974 by Walter Thompson in Woodstock, New York. Soundpainting gives to the soundpainter (the composer) the possibility to compose multi-disciplinary creations in real time by signing gestures (more than 1500 different signs in 2023) to indicate the material the performers will realize and the soundpainter will shape into the composition.

== History ==
=== Short overview of sign languages in the history of composition ===
Beginning in the middle of the 20th century there were several musicians who invented and used some form of sign language to compose in the moment. Some notable ones were Earle Brown, Sun Ra, Frank Zappa, Alan Silva and Butch Morris.

In the early 1950s, American composer Earle Brown wrote December 1952. Inspired by the work of Jackson Pollock, he proposed a new way of writing and composing music, using open-form ways of composing. For instance, in Calder Piece (first performed at the Théâtre de l’Atelier in Paris in 1966), he used a mobile from Alexander Calder that he would call a "chef d'orchestre" (French for conductor) to guide an ensemble of musicians. Brown met Merce Cunningham and John Cage in 1951 and they began to work together. On Cage's work, Brown said:

"Cage's Music of Changes was a further indication that the arts in general were beginning to consciously deal with the "given" material and, to varying degrees, liberating them from the inherited, functional concepts of control."

In the 1960s, Brown developed his idea of "open form", and many consider him as the original creator of "open form". His work was an inspiration for Soundpainting.

=== The origin of Soundpainting ===
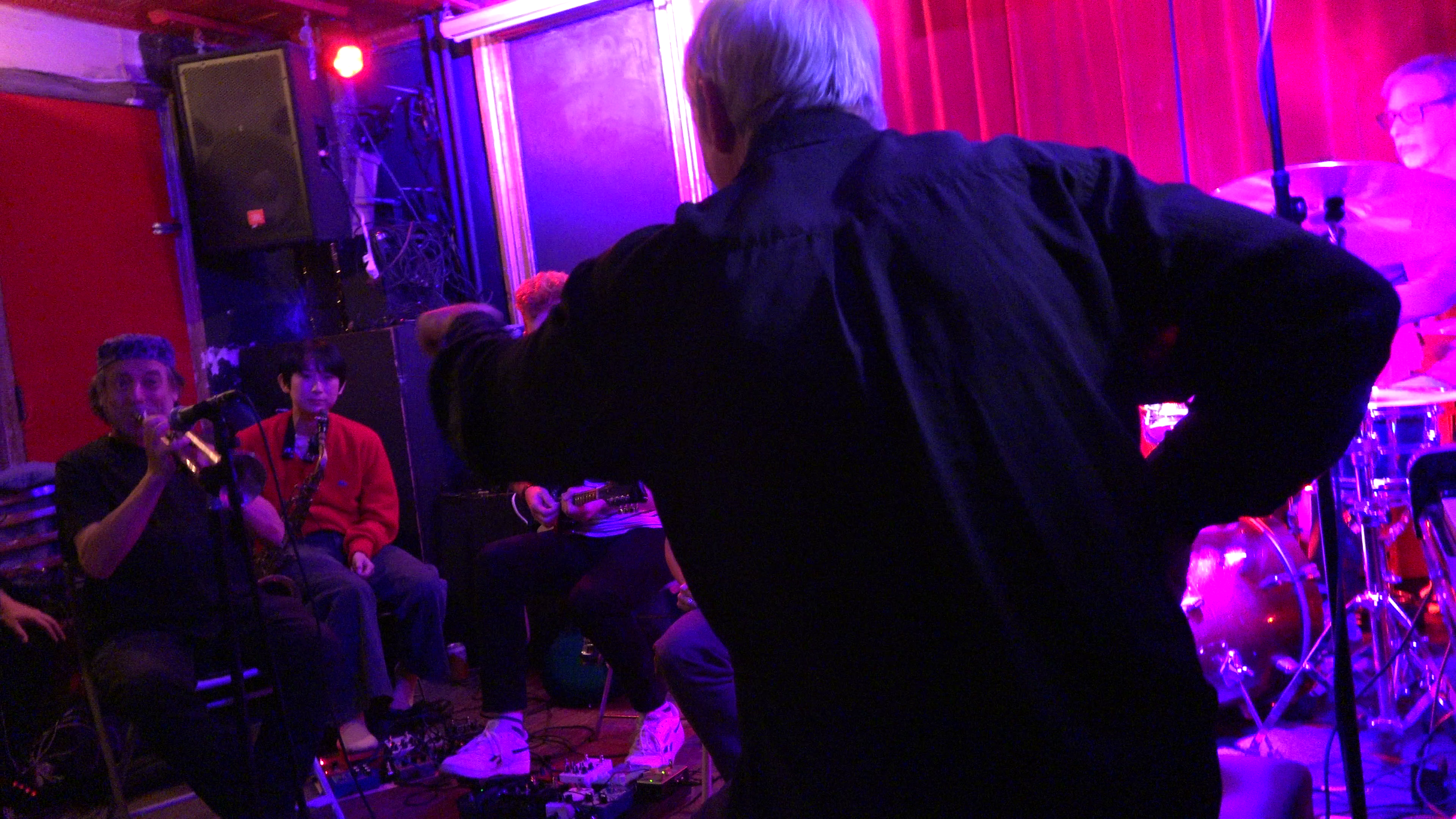
Walter Thompson soundpainting in NYC in 2024

Walter Thompson attended the Berklee school of Music from 1970 to 1974 where he studied composition, piano, woodwinds and percussion. Afterward, he received a scholarship from the National Endowment for the Arts to study composition and woodwinds with American composer Anthony Braxton.

Thompson, the son of a visual artist, wanted to create a new way of structuring music not in advance but in the moment. He wanted to have the possibility to compose in real time using predictable and unpredictable results from the performers. What Brown and Soundpainting have in common is the will to go beyond the limits of standard notated music. Brown's approach to composing and performing pieces was inspired by the methods of various artists such as Pollock's spontaneous decision-making process and Cunningham's use of chance operations in his choreography. In comparison, Thompson proposed a new way of composing where chance operations and spontaneous decision making were utilized as a means to further a composition that was being composed in its entirety in real time – nothing planned prior to the performance except for the knowledge of the Soundpainting language.

Soundpainting's purpose is to summarize plenty of composing methods, coming from all kinds of creative processes (theatrical, choreographic, musical, visual...), and to go beyond the idea of a pre-set score. It is not to be written, but to be seen and/or heard. This particularity is one of the differences between Soundpainting and the previous composing methods mentioned above.

In the early years (1980s) Thompson's New York City-based orchestra (The Walter Thompson Orchestra) was composed solely of musicians. In the 1990s he adapted the language to have the capacity to compose with actors, dancers and visual artists.

== Structure and analysis ==
=== Structure and grammar ===
The person "directing" the group is called "composer" or "soundpainter" and not "conductor". The soundpainter is not interpreting a work and/or guiding a group, they are composing in real-time a new piece of art with the performers. Soundpainting is therefore a tool and not a discipline. To be able to address the group, the soundpainter is using signs that utilize a precise syntax. The soundpainter follows a grammatical structure organized in four categories – Who, What, How and When. Each category gives information to the performer, who then interprets it.

"Who-signs" refers to which person/group of performers/discipline are going to be involved in the following phrase (one performer, all the dancers, whole group...). "What-signs" refers to what kind of content (material) the performers are being asked to play/perform (a long sustained sound, a repetitive rhythmic sequence...). "How-signs" refers to the way the composer would like the performers to perform the material (indications for sound and movement dynamics...). "When-signs" refers to the moment the performers enter or exit the composition (immediately, with a delay of 5 seconds...)

=== Basic approach to composing with Soundpainting ===
When using the syntax to sign to the performers, the soundpainter employs two basic concepts to create the phrase. With certain phrases the soundpainter generally knows what the results will be and with other phrases the soundpainter does not know what will be performed. Thompson called this approach "composing with the known and unknown". The gestures in Soundpainting are both signs to elicit specific responses as well as signs that allow the soundpainter to take varying levels of risk by not knowing exactly what will be performed. There are many signs the soundpainter may use to take different levels of risk.

=== Soundpainting's contribution to composition ===
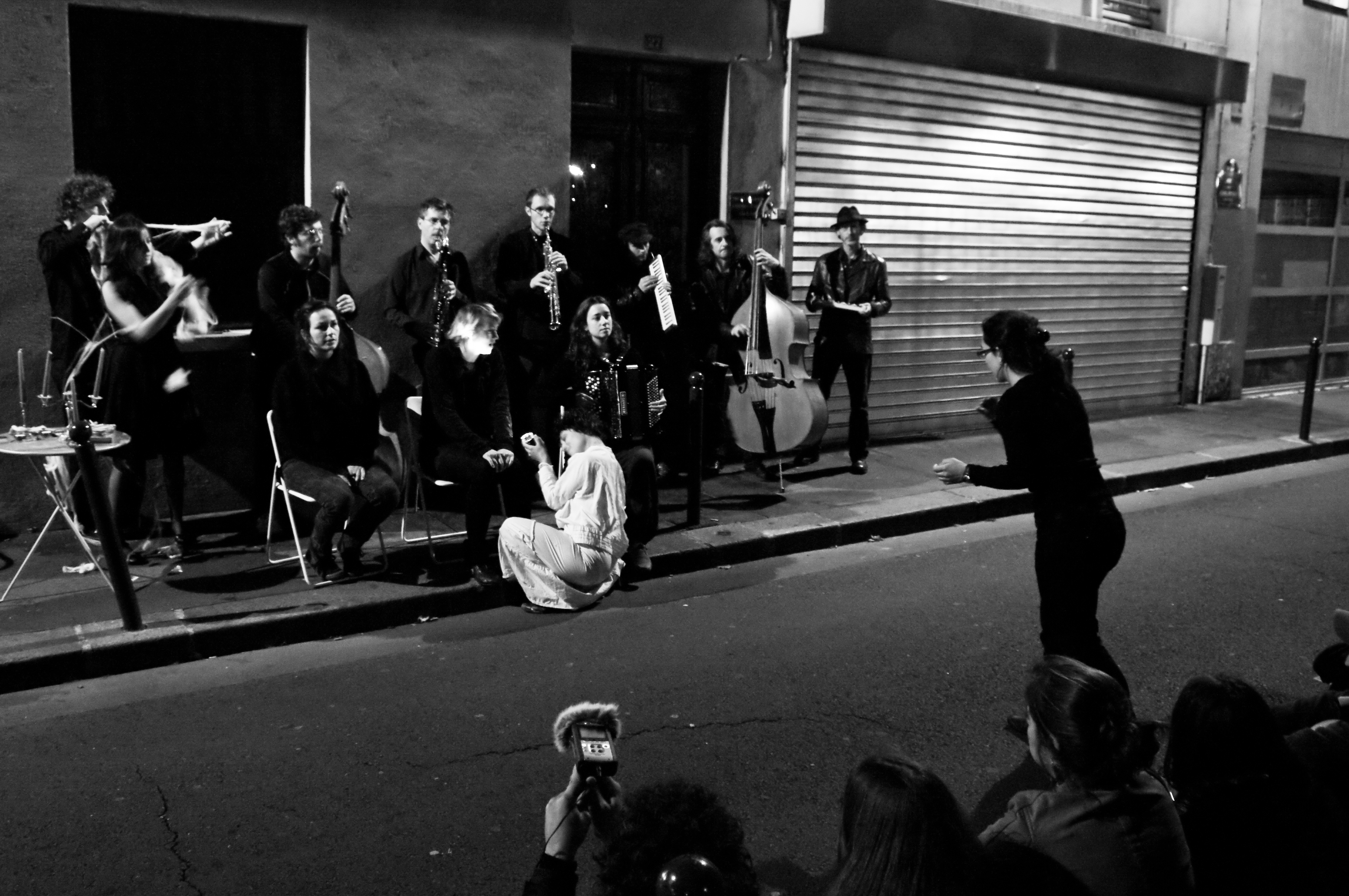
A group of Soundpainting in Paris in 2010

Soundpainting as a composing tool offers a composer the possibility to compose a work in real time in a similar manner as an improviser. This is a major aspect of the language that contributes a dynamic and accessible process to the world of composition and performance – the ability to shape material in action into a composition with diverse groups of performers, whether professional or amateur.

As a multidisciplinary language, Soundpainting has contributed to the hybrid medium of composition and performance practice. Soundpainting allows the composer the option of shaping a performance and incorporating any of the performing disciplines to create a piece that blends multiple disciplines.

== Soundpainting and education ==
=== A pedagogical resource ===
The philosophy behind the Soundpainting is that nothing can be considered a mistake. Once a performer begins to play, they will continue, no matter what, even if they misunderstood the phrase signed by the soundpainter. This approach offers participants an open field to express their ideas and interpretation. Soundpainting is based on the composer's exploration of the performers' offer. The soundpainter listens/watches and makes decisions on how to compose the piece based on what the performer has offered.

It is often used in fostering creativity with people of special needs: anybody with a body and/or a voice have the possibility to co-create. It can be taught to absolutely everyone, and is therefore a very inclusive language.

Even if Soundpainting is not yet formally accepted as a teaching tool in any music, theater, dance or art school in general, it is taught in a lot of them: The conservatoire du Centre in Paris, the Berlin University of the Arts (Universität der Künste), and even for some online events, among many other places. Certification has been created to validate a certain level of expertise, but it is not mandatory to teach.

=== A living language: Soundpainting Think Tank ===
The Soundpainting Think Tank is an annual conference of soundpainters from around the world that gather each summer to discuss, develop and share ideas about Soundpainting. The first Soundpainting Think Tanks were held in the summer of 1998, 1999 and 2000 in Woodstock, New York, at the Byrdcliffe Arts Colony and were a month long. More recent Think Tanks are a week-long and have been held in France, Spain, the UK and the United States.

== Further listening ==
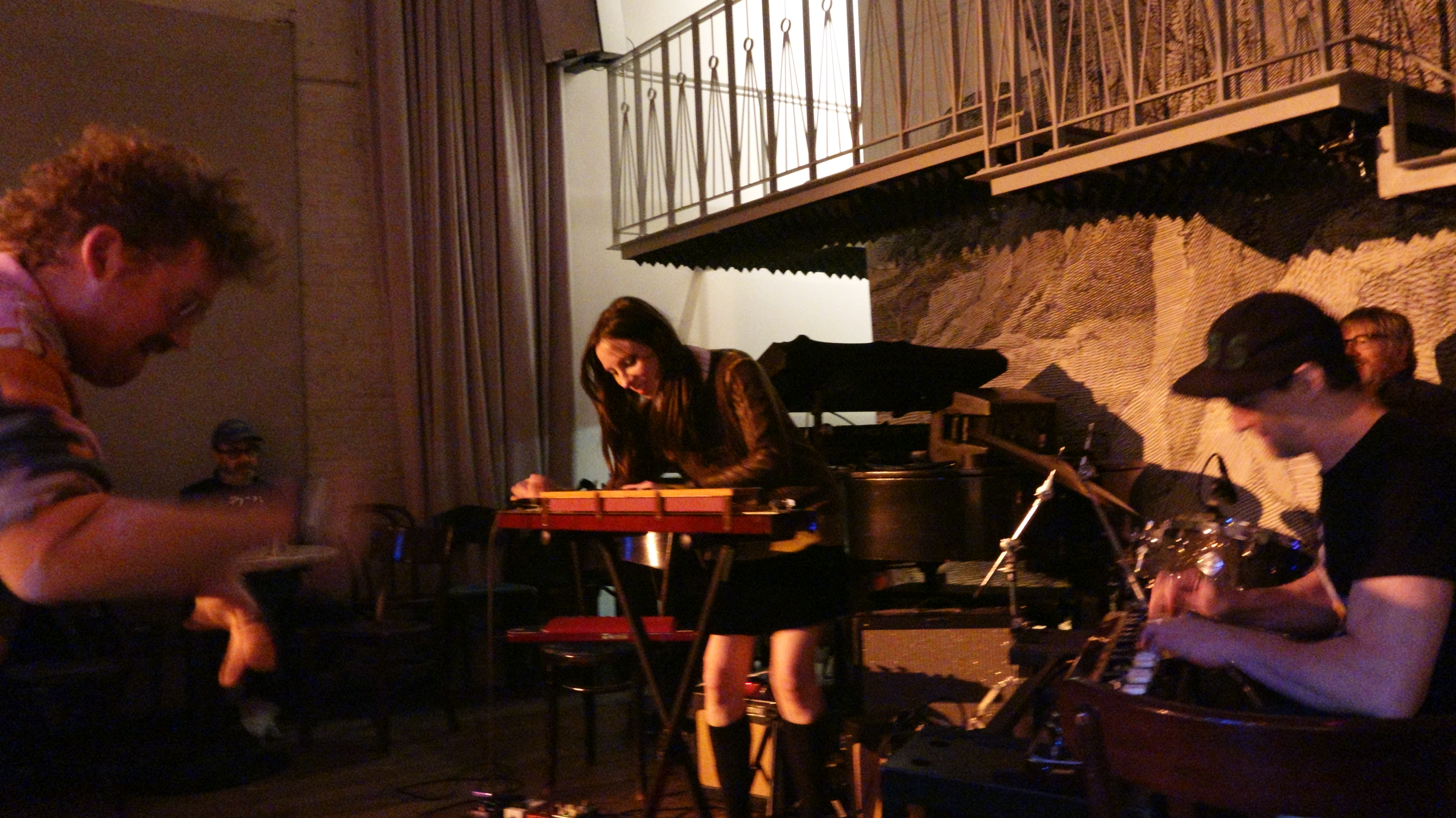
Sam Day Harmet soundpainting with Erica Mancini, Stephan LaRosa, and Steve Shelley at the Rhythm in the Kitchen fundraiser at Bowery Poetry Club in NYC in 2024

=== Some records done using Soundpainting ===
- Four Compositions with Walter Thompson and Anthony Braxton, Dane Records, recorded at Grog Kill Studio, Willow, N.Y., 1977
- John Zorn's Cobra: Live at the Knitting Factory, John Zorn, Knitting Factory Works, 1995
- PEXO: A Soundpainting Symphony, The Walter Thompson Orchestra, Recorded July 9, 2001 at Clinton Studio, New York City.
- Soundpainting Haydn, Gil Selinger (cello) and Walter Thompson (soundpainter), Novodisc Recordings, 2006
- Monologue de Schoenberg, Variations sur une collection de timbres, performed by the Klangfarben Ensemble, Recorded March 8 and 9, 2012, the Cartonnerie in Reims (France).
- Mosaïques, Ensemble Multilatérale, with François Cotinaud and Benjamin de la Fuente, Label Musivi 2017.
- What Can We Say?, SeFa LoCo + Thompson, Recorded January 7, 2023 at Mighty Fine Productions in Denver, CO, Right Brain Records, 2023
