= Calidore String Quartet =

American string quartet

The Calidore String Quartet is an internationally performing classical music string quartet based in New York City. The Calidore is composed of violinists Jeffrey Myers and Ryan Meehan, violist Jeremy Berry and cellist Estelle Choi.

Formed at the Colburn Conservatory of Music in 2010, the quartet won the grand prize at the inaugural 2016 M-Prize Competition, sponsored by the University of Michigan School of Music, Theatre & Dance. The $100,000 M-Prize was, at the time, the largest chamber-music award in the world. In February 2016, the Calidore String Quartet became the first North American ensemble to receive a fellowship from the London-based Borletti-Buitoni Trust. Within their first two years, the quartet won the Fischoff National Chamber Music Competition and the Coleman National Chamber Music Competition, and they earned top prizes at the 2012 ARD Munich String Quartet Competition and the Hamburg International Chamber Music Competition. In 2018, the Calidore Quartet received an Avery Fisher Career Grant.

The quartet was artist-in-residence at Stony Brook University from 2014 to 2016. In late 2016 they joined the roster of the Chamber Music Society of Lincoln Center Bowers Program, and currently are Artists of the Society. The quartet regularly performs across North America, Europe and Asia and has appeared in Carnegie Hall, Wigmore Hall, Lincoln Center, Kumho Art Hall (Seoul) and in festivals including Verbier, Ravinia, Aspen, Rheingau, Festspiele Mecklenburg-Vorpommern, Mostly Mozart (New York) and East Neuk (UK). They have released numerous critically acclaimed albums. Their debut album includes string quartets by Mendelssohn and Haydn and was heralded as "the epitome of confidence and finesse" by Gramophone magazine. Their second album is a survey of music from World War I released on the French label Éditions Hortus. The quartet is represented worldwide by Opus 3 Artists.
