= Gary Scavone =

Computer music researcher and musician

Gary Paul Scavone is a computer music researcher and musician.

Scavone is currently an associate professor of music technology at McGill University. Previously, Scavone directed the Center for Computer Research in Music and Acoustics at Stanford University. He, along with Perry Cook, authored the Synthesis Toolkit (STK). After conducting extensive research into the digital modeling of woodwind instruments (the subject of his doctoral dissertation), Scavone turned to the electronic synthesis of such instruments.

Scavone plays saxophone. He studied classical saxophone at the Conservatoire National de Région de Bordeaux, France, with Jean-Marie Londeix in 1989, sponsored by a Fulbright scholarship. In the summers of 1987, 1988 and 1990 he played as a street musician in almost every major European capital together with Dan Gordon.
