= Smule =

Mobile app developer

Smule, Inc.
- Type: Private
- Industry: Mobile music apps; Computer software
- Founded: Palo Alto, California, U.S. (2008)
- Founders: Jeff Smith and Ge Wang
- Headquarters: Salt Lake City, Utah, U.S.
- Area served: Worldwide
- Key people: Jeff Smith (CEO and co-founder)
- Products: "Smule" (flagship app), "AutoRap", "Guitar!", "Ocarina 2", "Glee Karaoke", I Am T-Pain, "Ocarina", "Magic Piano", "Magic Fiddle", Sonic Lighter, "Style Studio", Zephyr, Leaf Trombone: World Stage
- Revenue: ▲$101 Million (2017)
- Number of employees: 190
- Website: smule.com

Smule is an American mobile app developer with headquarters in Salt Lake City, Utah. The company specializes in developing social music-making and collaboration applications for iOS, Android, and Web.

The company was founded in 2008 by Jeff Smith and Stanford assistant professor Ge Wang. "Music was the original social network before Instagram and Facebook," said Smith, the co-founder and CEO of Smule. Wang commented that the goal of the apps was to draw users in and "by the time they realize they're making music, 'it's too late — they're already having fun.'" In December 2011, Smule acquired fellow music app developer Khush. On July 31, 2013, Wang stepped down from his role at Smule to return to Stanford full-time. Smule had 52 million monthly active users in 2017. Smule has raised $156.5 million to date, with Tencent leading their latest fundraising round. "We wanted to bring music back to its social roots," Smith said. "With mobile phones we make people more expressive and can we connect them to make them social together." The company raised $74 million in funding in 2018 from Tencent and Times Bridge, the VC wing of India media conglomerate The Times Group.

== Apps developed ==
Name	Release date
Guitar! by Smule	May 23, 2013
Smule (formerly Sing! Karaoke or Sing!)	August 8, 2012
AutoRap	July 17, 2012
Magic Piano by Smule	May 4, 2011
Magic Piano HD	April 1, 2010
LaDiDa	September 26, 2009
Magic Guitar	December 15, 2011
CineBeat	December 13, 2012
Ocarina 2	June 19, 2012
Songify	July 7, 2011
MadPad	September 8, 2011
Glee Karaoke	April 15, 2010
I Am T-Pain (Auto-Tune)	September 2, 2009
Beatstream	March 21, 2012
Leaf Trombone: World Stage	April 15, 2009
Magic Fiddle	November 10, 2010
Ocarina	November 6, 2008
Zephyr	December 29, 2008
Sonic Vox	October 24, 2008
Sonic Lighter	September 15, 2008
Sonic Boom	October 18, 2008
