= Sō Percussion =

American percussion ensemble

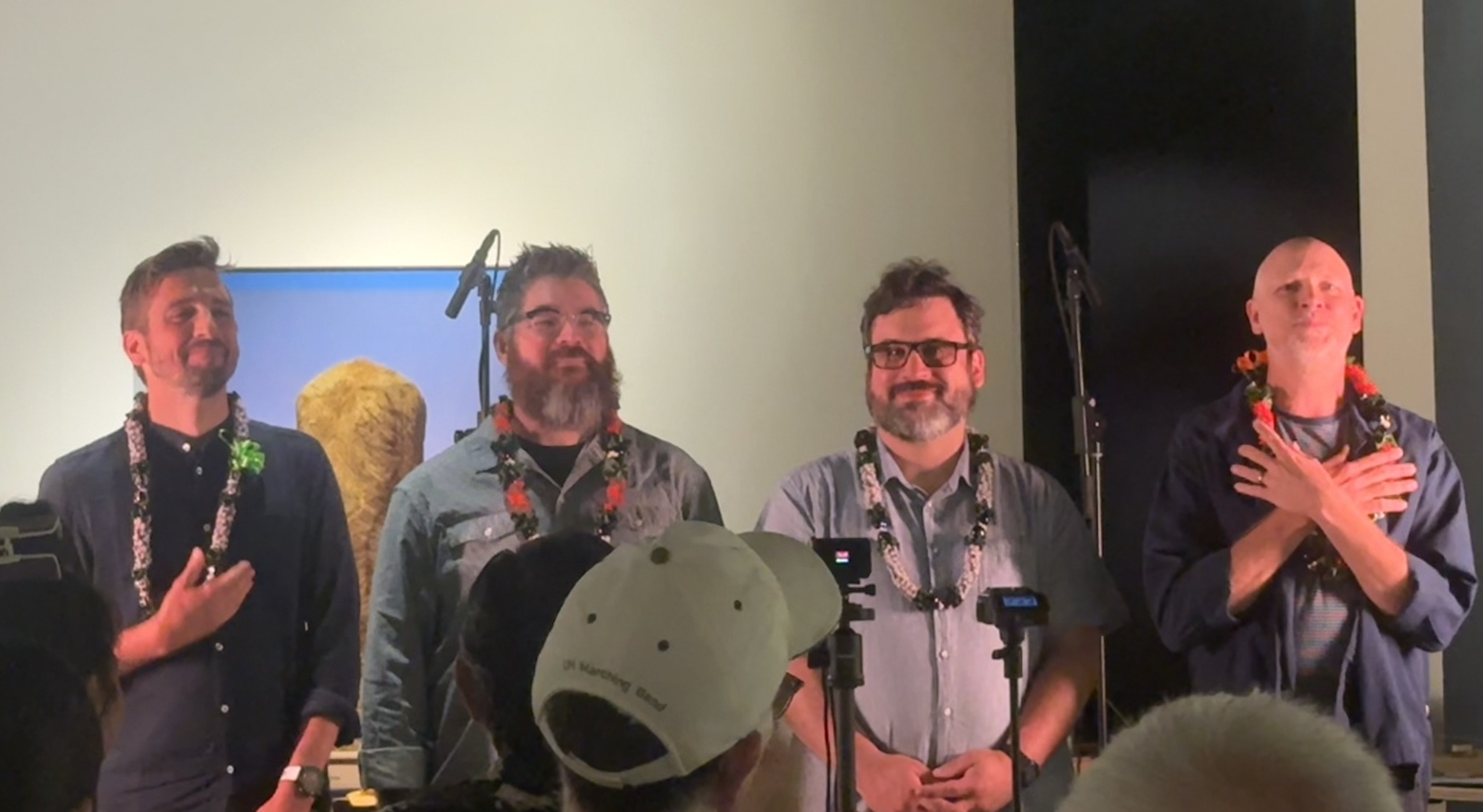
- Sō Percussion in 2026

Background information
- Origin: Brooklyn, New York
- Genre: Percussion
- Labels: Cantaloupe Music; Nonesuch Records; Thrill Jockey; Brassland Records; New Amsterdam Records
- Members: Josh Quillen; Adam Sliwinski; Jason Treuting; Eric Cha-Beach
- Past members: Tim Feeney; Todd Meehan; Douglas Perkins; Lawson White
- Website: Official Site

Sō Percussion is a Grammy winning American percussion quartet formed in 1999 and based in New York City.

Composed of Josh Quillen, Adam Sliwinski, Jason Treuting, and Eric Cha-Beach, the group is well known for recording and touring internationally and for their work with composers such as Steve Reich, David Lang, Caroline Shaw, Bryce Dessner, Julia Wolfe, Vijay Iyer, Fred Frith, Angélica Negrón, Nathalie Joachim, Dan Trueman, Tristan Perich, Paul Lansky, Claire Rousay, Shodekeh Talifero, Leilehua Lanzilotti, Steven Mackey, Kendall K. Williams, Shara Nova, Martin Bresnick, Oscar Bettison, Olivier Tarpaga, Evan Ziporyn, and Arvo Pärt. Originally formed when the members were students of Robert van Sice at the Yale School of Music, the group also continues to play works from the standard repertoire of percussion ensemble music—including works by composers such as John Cage, Julius Eastman, Pauline Oliveros, George Crumb, and Iannis Xenakis. In addition to their work with composers, the members of Sō Percussion produce original music, including large scale evening-length works.

The group is also known for their use of non-standard instruments and found sounds in performance and on recordings, such as scrap metal, rocks, flower pots, and an amplified cactus.

Sō Percussion has released albums on Cantaloupe Music, Nonesuch Records, Thrill Jockey, Brassland Records, and New Amsterdam Records. The group endorses Zildjian, Vic Firth, Remo and Pearl/Adams.

== Naming ==
The group's name was suggested by Jenise Treuting, Jason Treuting's sister.

Jenise writes,

The Sō in Sō Percussion comes from 奏, the second character in the compound Japanese word 演奏 (ensou), to perform music. By itself, so means "to play an instrument." But it can also mean "to be successful," "to determine a direction and move forward," and "to present to the gods or ruler." Scholars have suggested that the latter comes from the character's etymology, which included the element "to offer with both hands." 奏 is a bold, straightforward character, but lends itself to calligraphy with a certain energy that gives so a springy, delicate look.

== Collaborations ==
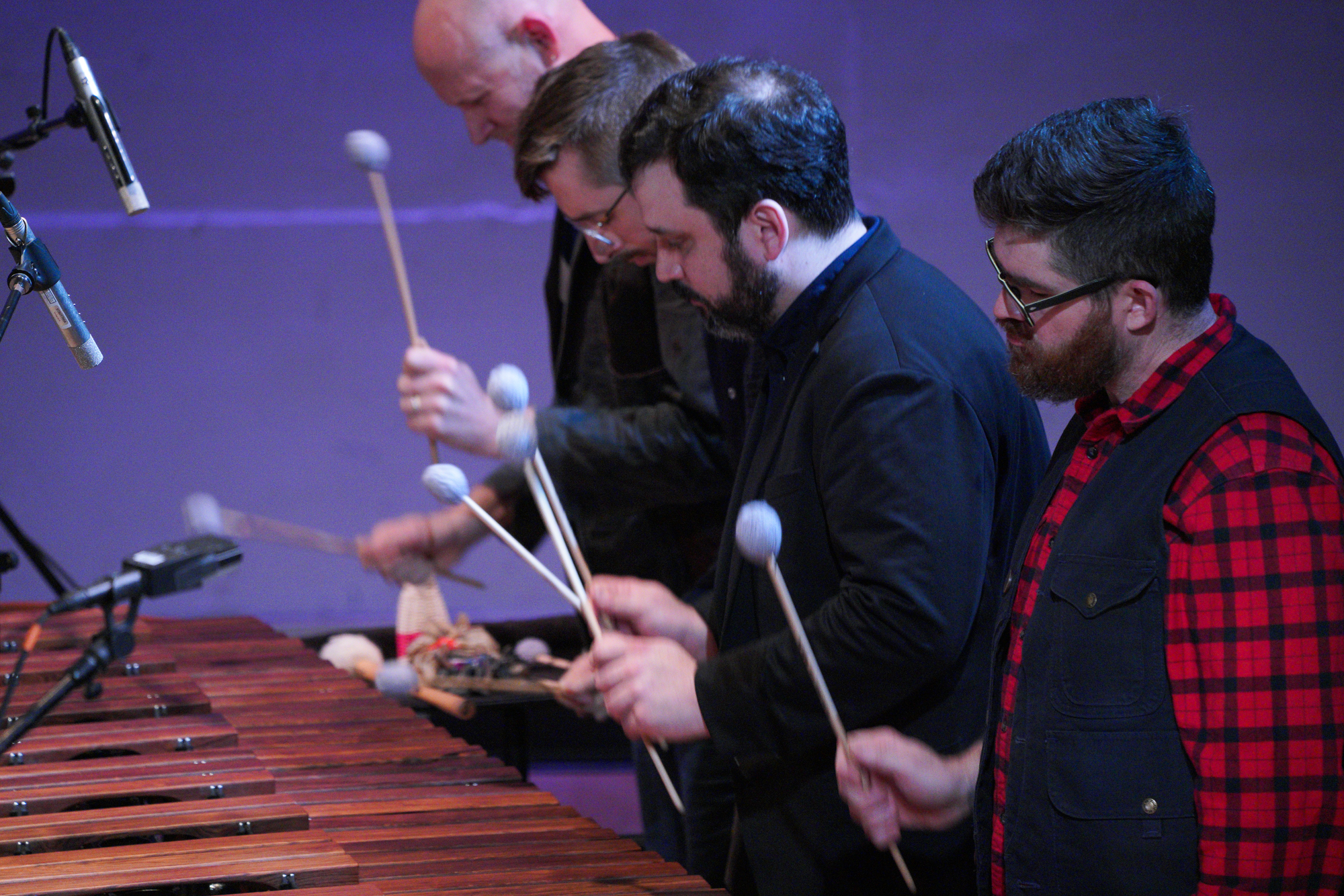
Members of Sō Percussion play at the Miller Theatre in New York in February, 2020

Sō Percussion frequently collaborates with other musicians and performers from around the world, including The National (appearing on Grammy-winning album 'Sleep Well Beast'), Buke and Gase, Shara Nova, Dave Douglas, Matmos, Medeski Martin & Wood, Dan Deacon, The Dirty Projectors, Glenn Kotche, Bobby Previte, Kid Millions/Man Forever, Eli Keszler, Emily Johnson, Ain Gordon, Shen Wei, and The Princeton Laptop Orchestra. Recent collaborative projects include the creation with Jad Abumrad of a score to the Radiolab story "The Heartbeat," part of the episode "Radiolab Live: Telltale Hearts featuring Oliver Sacks," produced by Molly Webster and performed live by Sō Percussion at Brooklyn Academy of Music's "RadioLoveFest.". So Percussion worked with composer West Dylan Thordson as contributing performers on the score of The Jinx: The Life and Deaths of Robert Durst, a 2015 HBO documentary miniseries about Robert Durst.

== Discography ==
- Sō Percussion (2004)
- Steve Reich: Drumming (2005)
- Amid the Noise (2006) *CD/DVD
- Five (and-a-half) Gardens — with Trollstilt (2007)
- Treasure State — with Matmos (2010)
- Paul Lansky: Threads (2011)
- Steve Reich: WTC 9/11 – Mallet Quartet Recording (2011) *CD/DVD
- Steve Mackey: It Is Time (2011) *CD/DVD
- Martin Bresnick: Caprichos Enfaticos with Lisa Moore, piano (2011)
- Bad Mango with Dave Douglas, trumpet (2011)
- David Lang: The Woodmans – Music From the Film (2011)
- Amid the Noise Remixes (2011)
- Cage 100: Bootleg Series (2012)
- Where (we) Live (2012)
- neither Anvil nor Pulley (2013)
- Cenk Ergun: Nana – Proximity Recording (2014)
- Man Forever: Ryonen (2014)
- Bobby Previte: TERMINALS (2014)
- Bryce Dessner: Music for Wood and Strings (2015)
- Glenn Kotche: Drumkit Quartets (2016)
- Steve Reich and So Percussion: Drumming Live (2017)
- Color Theory, with PRISM Sax Quartet (2017)
- Dan Trueman: Songs That Are Hard to Sing – with JACK Quartet (2019)
- A Record Of... – with Buke and Gase (2021)
- Caroline Shaw: Narrow Sea – with Dawn Upshaw and Gil Kalish (2021)
- Julius Eastman: Stay On It – with MEDIAQUEER, Adam Tendler, Beth Meyers, Grey Mcmurray, Shelley Washington & Alex Sopp (2021)
- Paul Lansky: Angles (2021)
- Steve Reich with NEXUS Percussion (2021)
- Let The Soil Play Its Simple Part – with Caroline Shaw (2021)
- Julia Wolfe: Forbidden Love (2022)
- Individuate – With Darian Thomas, Bergamot Quartet, Shelby Blezinger-McCay, and Kasey Blezinger (2022)
- Rectangles and Circumstance – with Caroline Shaw (2024)

== Education ==
Princeton University
Since 2014, the members of Sō Percussion have served as the Edward T. Cone performers-in-residence at Princeton University. The group has commissioned and recorded major works from Princeton composition faculty Steven Mackey, Paul Lansky, and Dan Trueman, as well as collaborating many times with the Princeton Sound Kitchen and Princeton Laptop Orchestra (PLOrk).

Sō Percussion Summer Institute
The annual Sō Percussion Summer Institute (SōSI), founded in 2009, also takes place on Princeton's campus. The program features teaching and performing with the members of Sō Percussion and with Princeton faculty and student composers. Each year includes a number of concerts on Princeton's campus, in New York, outdoors in downtown Princeton, and in Small World coffee shop.

Bard College Conservatory
In 2011 the members of Sō Percussion established the first percussion department at the Bard College Conservatory of Music. The undergraduate program is a five-year double degree. Sō Percussion members Eric Cha-Beach and Jason Treuting are current co-directors of the department, together with timpanist Jason Haaheim

== Original music ==
Works with Caroline Shaw (2021–2024)
The members of Sō Percussion co-composed two sets of songs together with singer and composer Caroline Shaw, each released as an album on Nonesuch Records – Let the Soil Play Its Simple Part (2021) and Rectangles and Circumstance (2024), the latter of which received a 2025 Grammy Award for Best Chamber Music/Small Ensemble Performance.

From Out a Darker Sea (2017)
From Out a Darker Sea explores the former coal mining communities of East Durham, UK in a collaboration with Forma Arts and Amber Films.

A Gun Show (2016)
A Gun Show is an exploration of American gun culture using music, video, spoken text, and movement. The project was created collaboratively by the members of Sō Percussion together with director Ain Gordon and choreographer Emily Johnson.

Where (we) Live (2013)
Where (we) Live was an original project exploring ideas about home and community, created together with guitarist Grey Mcmurray, director Ain Gordon, choreographer Emily Johnson, and video designer Martin Schmidt.

2wice – Fifth Wall (2012)
Members of Sō Percussion composed the score for 'Fifth Wall' – an iPad-based performance by dancer Jonah Bokaer, published by dance magazine 2wice.

Shen Wei – Undivided/Divided (2011)
The members of Sō Percussion composed the music for Undivided/Divided with choreographer Shen Wei, which premiered at the Park Avenue Armory in November, 2011.

Martin Kersels: 5 Songs (2010)
In 2010 the Whitney Museum commissioned the members of Sō Percussion to write new original music for performance in connection with Martin Kersels' sculpture project for the Whitney Biennial: 5 Songs.

Imaginary City (2009)
Inspired by the Italo Calvino novel Invisible Cities, Imaginary City used as inspiration the six cities that are home to the presenters that commissioned it: The Brooklyn Academy of Music in Brooklyn, NY; The Myrna Loy Center in Helena, MT; The Cleveland Museum of Art in Cleveland, OH; The Flynn Center in Burlington, VT; Diverseworks Art Space in Houston, TX; and The Newman Center in Denver, CO. The project again included original video created by Jenise Treuting as well as theatrical direction by Rinde Eckert.

Music for Trains (2008)
In 2008 Sō Percussion developed the Music for Trains project in southern Vermont. The month-long residency project centered around performances in and around the towns of Brattleboro and Bellows Falls, including concerts in the train stations of those two towns, pre-recorded mp3 players listened to on the trains, and materials gathered from the local community. The project also included original video created by Jenise Treuting and an on-stage sculpture created by local artist Ahren Ahrenholz.

Amid the Noise (2006)
A series of short pieces written by group member Jason Treuting, Amid the Noise was the first project of original music created and recorded by members of Sō Percussion. The project also features videos created by video artist Jenise Treuting, which were included in the CD/DVD release of 2006.

== Awards ==
Year	Award	Category	Work	Result	Ref.
2025	Grammy Award	Best Chamber Music/Small Ensemble Performance	Rectangles and Circumstance	Won	

- Bessie Award for Outstanding Musical Composition/Sound Design – 2016
- American Music Center Trailblazer Award – 2011
- Chamber Music America/ASCAP Award for Adventurous Programming – 2004, 2006, 2010
- ASCAP John Cage Award – 2009
- International Percussion Competition Luxembourg 2nd Place – 2005

== Selected works commissioned ==
- Dennis DeSantis: Shifty (2000)
- David Lang: the so-called laws of nature (2002)
- Paul Lansky: Threads (2006)
- Martin Bresnick: Caprichos Enfaticos (2007)
- Steven Mackey: It Is Time (2010)
- Dan Trueman: neither anvil nor pulley (2010)
- Steve Reich: Mallet Quartet (2010)
- Bobby Previte: Terminals (2011)
- Dan Deacon: Ghostbuster Cook: The Origin of the Riddler (2011)
- Glenn Kotche: Drumkit Quartets (2011)
- David Lang: man made (2013)
- Bryce Dessner: Music for Wood and Strings (2013)
- Shara Nova/So Percussion: Timeline (2015)
- Paul Lansky: Springs (2016)
- Caroline Shaw: Narrow Sea (2017) with Dawn Upshaw
- Donnacha Dennehy: Broken Unison (2017)
- Dan Trueman: Songs That Are Hard to Sing (2017) with JACK Quartet
- Vijay Iyer: TORQUE (2018)
- Julia Wolfe: Forbidden Love (2019)
- Shodekeh Talifero: Vodalities, Paradigms of Consciousness for the Human Voice (2021)
- Nathalie Joachim: Note to Self (2021)
- Bora Yoon: the wonder that's keeping the stars apart (2022)
- Olivier Tarpaga: Fēfē (2023)
- Angélica Negrón: Inward Pieces (2023)
- Vijay Iyer: Dharma Eye (2023)
- Leilehua Lanzilotti: Sending Messages (2024)
- Claire Rousay: In Places (2024)
