= Partita for 8 Voices =

Composition by Caroline Shaw

- by Caroline Shaw
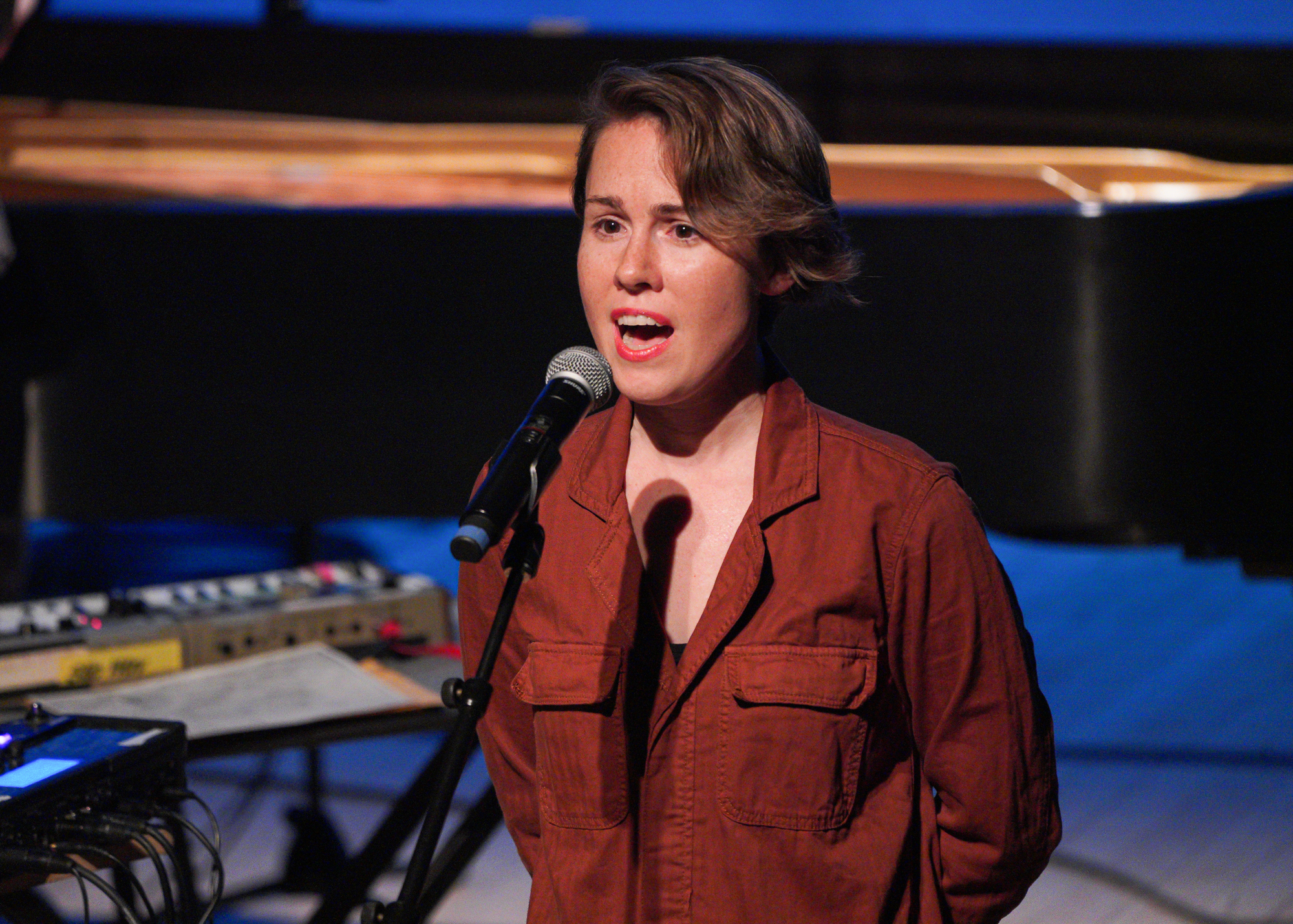
- Caroline Shaw in 2020
- Genre: A cappella; classical
- Composed: 2009–2012
- Performed: November 4, 2013: (Le) Poisson Rouge
- Published: October 30, 2012
- Movements: 4

Partita for 8 Voices is an a cappella composition by American composer Caroline Shaw. It was composed from 2009 through 2012 for the vocal group Roomful of Teeth and was released on their Grammy Award-winning self-titled debut album on October 30, 2012. The piece was awarded the Pulitzer Prize for Music on April 15, 2013, making Shaw the youngest recipient of the award. The work was not premiered in full until November 4, 2013, at (Le) Poisson Rouge in New York City.

== Composition ==
Partita for 8 Voices has a duration of roughly 25 minutes and is composed of four movements named after Baroque dances:

1. Allemande
2. Sarabande
3. Courante
4. Passacaglia

Shaw said the piece was inspired by Sol LeWitt's Wall Drawing 305 and "...our basic desire to draw a line from one point to another." Some of the lyrics are from textual instructions LeWitt wrote to direct the draftsperson (Jo Watanabe in the first instance) who does the actual drawing.

== Reception ==
At the premiere of the complete Partita for 8 Voices, Justin Davidson of New York wrote that Shaw had "discovered a lode of the rarest commodity in contemporary music: joy."

In October 2019, several performers of katajjaq, including Canadian Inuk throat singer Tanya Tagaq, accused Caroline Shaw and Roomful of Teeth of having engaged in cultural appropriation and exoticism for the perceived uncredited quotation of a katajjaq song in the third movement of Partita. In a public statement released by Caroline Shaw and artistic director Brad Wells, Roomful of Teeth acknowledged that they had hired and studied with Inuit singers in 2010 and that techniques learned from those studies had been used in Partita; they further stated that they believed those "patterns to be sufficiently distinct from katajjaq".

In 2019, The Guardian ranked Partita as the 20th greatest work of art music since 2000, with Erica Jeal dubbing it "an explosion of energy cramming speech, song and virtually every extended vocal technique you can think of into its four 'classical' dance movements. It might blow apart solemn, hard-boiled notions of greatness, but it has to be the most joyous work on this list."

== In media ==
The third movement of Partita, "III. Courante", can be heard in numerous episodes of the German Netflix series Dark (2017–2020).

The first movement was used as the theme song for the 2022 BBC Television drama Marriage.

The third movement, performed by Roomful of Teeth, is used in the 2022 film Tár.
