= Laptop battle =

Competitive music event

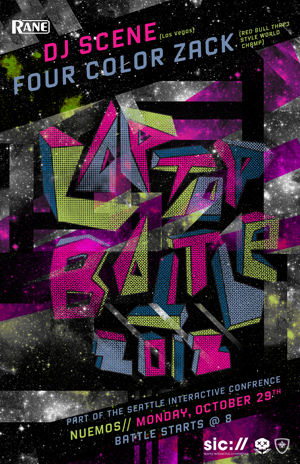
Laptop Battle promotional flyer from 2012

A laptop battle is a competitive event for an electronic musician to match their skills against others. Founded in Seattle, Washington in 2003 by Zach Huntting and Kris Moon of the Fourthcity Arts Collective, in collaboration with Steven Ford, and inspired in part by Liz Revision's Laptop Cage Match held in Chicago in 2002, the format caught on quickly and spread worldwide. Within 5 years, there were chapters in the UK, Germany, Italy, France, Japan, New Zealand, Puerto Rico, Canada and across the US. US-based chapters spread from Seattle to Philadelphia, Brooklyn, Boston, DC, Miami, Dallas, Atlanta, Austin, LA, San Francisco, Portland and more. Competition rules vary based on local chapter. The original rules limited contestants to a small area and limit equipment to a laptop computer with one external MIDI controller and a soundcard (this set-up is very similar to those used for live PA). There are typically three or four rounds, following a single elimination bracket or similar structure. Each round consists of a number of head-to-head matches between two randomly selected participants. Rules vary, but typically the competitors are allowed two to three minutes on stage to play their individual compositions. Stage presence is often a key element for judging, in addition to technical finesse and an ability to engage the audience.

A panel of judges decide which contestant advances to the next round, single elimination style. Usually, there are no restrictions on the type of material performed other than it must be the competitor's original creation. This aids in providing a distinction from DJ battles, wherein competitors play music created by others. Musical genres vary widely, with tendencies towards intelligent dance music, glitch, experimental electronica, mashups, house and technoid. Notable judges have included edIT & Boreta from Glitch Mob, Richard Devine from Warp/Schematic, Robotspeak, Daedelus, Dave Pezzner, Starkey, Mochipet, and Mickey T from the Drum Machine Museum.

Various local and national laptop battles have garnered the attention of electronic music and sound design production sponsors, such as Ableton, Mackie, Rane, M-Audio, Cycling '74, MixMeister Technologies, Vestax, Propellerheads, and Native Instruments, as well as Intel, SXSW, AMODA, Soy Clothing, Digidesign, Decibel Festival, SFSU, Vice Magazine and others.. Sponsor products are often included in competition prizes. Laptop battles are becoming a worldwide phenomenon and have greatly contributed to the growth and acceptance of the laptop as a musical instrument and digitally produced music in general.

== Formats ==
All formats vary in length of rounds (usually 2–3 minutes) and competition bracket style (single or double elimination). Some battles also include alternating sets by each performer, such as two 2-minute sets each. Mouse and keyboard rules may vary as well, and sometimes will allow for a USB version of the peripheral if the on-board peripheral is disabled or unused on the laptop.

=== Laptop only ===
This format was used in the 2006 Atlanta Laptop Battle I, II, and III.

This format only allows the following equipment:

- One laptop
- One external sound card

=== Single MIDI controller ===
This format was used for the 2006 US National Finals, the 2006 Atlanta Laptop Battle Finals, and the Laptop Battle UK competitions.

This format has the following restrictions:

- One laptop computer
- One external sound card
- One MIDI controller
- All equipment must fit in a 2' x 2' square

=== Exhibition matches ===
This format was featured in the 2007 Atlanta Preliminaries I Laptop Battle. It involves two competitors not included in the single- or double-elimination tournament structure, and may include more experienced performers or the judges from the ongoing laptop battle. This format is unique in that the actual sonic material utilized in the battle is limited, and performers have a limited amount of time to create their pieces.

This format has the following restrictions:

- One laptop computer
- One external sound card
- One MIDI controller
- All equipment must fit in a 2' x 2' square
- Preparation is limited to a specific window of time before the match
- Source material is limited to supplied samples, which are not available to the performers until the preparation window

== See also ==
- Laptronica
- Computer music
- Battle of the Bands
