= Yesenia Montilla =

American poet

Yesenia Montilla was born and raised in New York City. A 2014 Cantomundo Fellow, her poetry has appeared in the chapbook for the Crowns of Your Head, as well as the literary journals The Gulf Coast, Prairie Schooner, Pittsburgh Poetry Review, and others.

== Career ==
Montilla received a BA from Hunter College and an MFA from Drew University in Poetry and Poetry in Translation.

== Publications ==
The Pink Box, Aquarius Press, 2015.
