= Opus 3 Artists =

Artists management company

- Type: Private
- Industry: Music artist management
- Founded: 1976
- Headquarters: New York City, New York, United States; Los Angeles, California, United States
- Key people: David V. Foster, former President & CEO

Opus 3 Artists is an independent artists management firm with offices in New York City, Los Angeles and Berlin and represents several classical artists, as well as artists in the non-classical genres, such as jazz, world music, theater, dance, and special attractions. Formerly the classical music division of International Creative Management (ICM), Opus 3 Artists was created in 2006. The organization was started by Sol Hurok, whose Hurok Concerts began in the 1920s and lasted through the 1970s. In 1976 the former president of the company, Sheldon Gold, started his own firm, ICM Artists Ltd., taking with it several Hurok clients. The company separated from ICM in 2006 as Opus 3 Artists. David V. Foster served as president and CEO of Opus 3 Artists from 1995 to 2021. The company represents several notable artists and groups, including Yo-Yo Ma, Gil Shaham, Krystian Zimerman, and Alvin Ailey American Dance Theater.
