= The Baltimore Bomb =

Orchestral work by Caroline Shaw

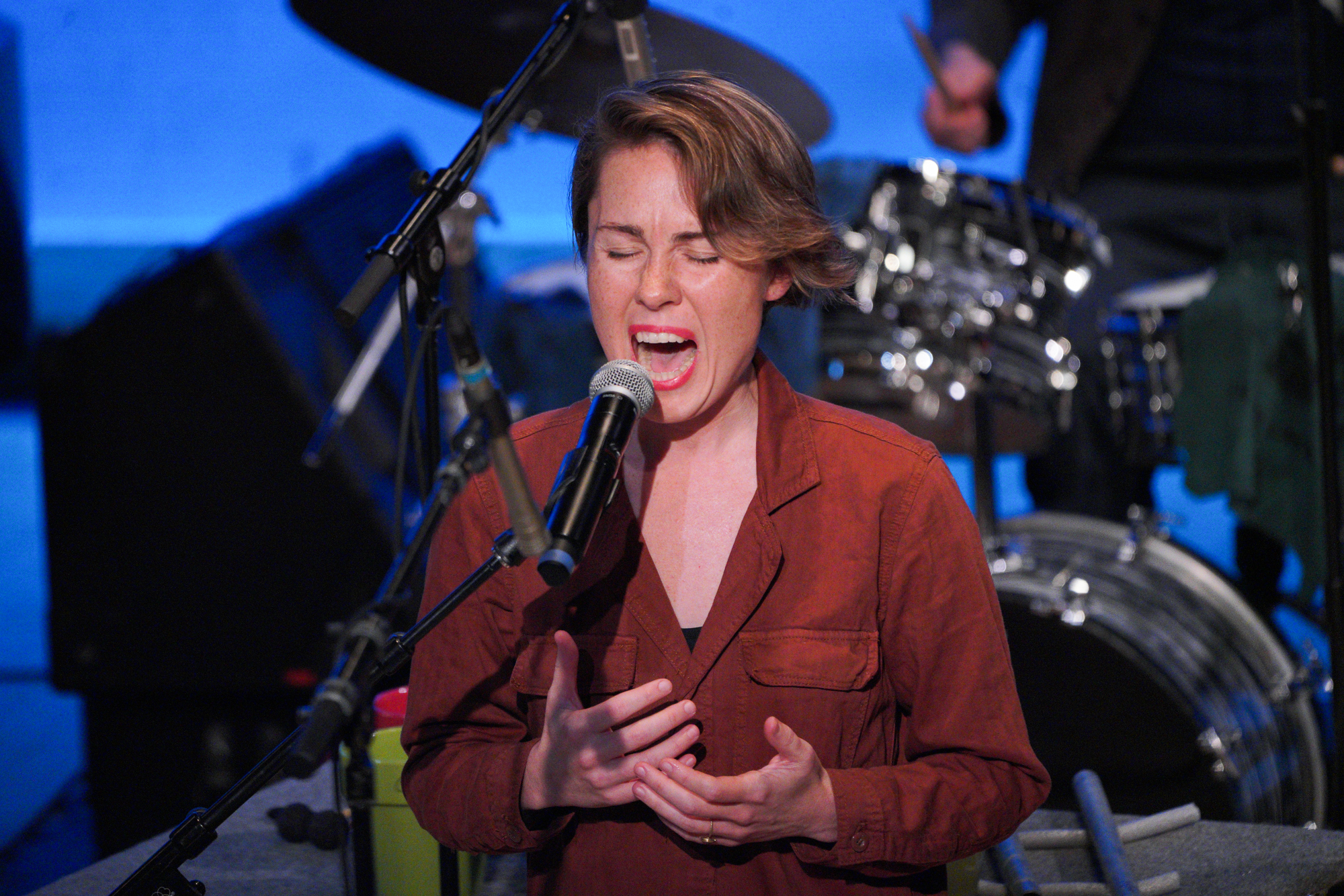
Caroline Shaw performing at the Miller Theatre, 2022

The Baltimore Bomb is a one-movement composition for orchestra by the American composer Caroline Shaw. The work was commissioned by the Baltimore Symphony Orchestra in celebration of the ensemble's centennial. Its world premiere was given at the Joseph Meyerhoff Symphony Hall on September 17, 2016, by the Baltimore Symphony Orchestra conducted by Marin Alsop. The piece is named after an iconic Baltimore pie known as the "Baltimore Bomb."

== Reception ==
The Baltimore Bomb has been praised by music critics. Tim Smith of The Baltimore Sun called the work "an attractive curtain-raiser" and wrote, "A suggestion of clanking cutlery from the percussion section — evoking eager dessert eaters, perhaps — provides an initial pulse for The Baltimore Bomb, which gets further fuel from lush chord progressions." J. T. Hassell of the Washington Classical Review further remarked, "Appropriately, this commissioned work by the Pulitzer Prize-winning American composer began with spoons clinking rhythmically on a plate. Out of this grew an effervescent swell of strings and winds, which Alsop steadily built into a sumptuous statement from the full orchestra. This brief climax subsided and diminished steadily and returned to the lone sound of spoons on plates to close the piece."
