= Ge Wang =

Chinese-American musician, businessman (born 1977)

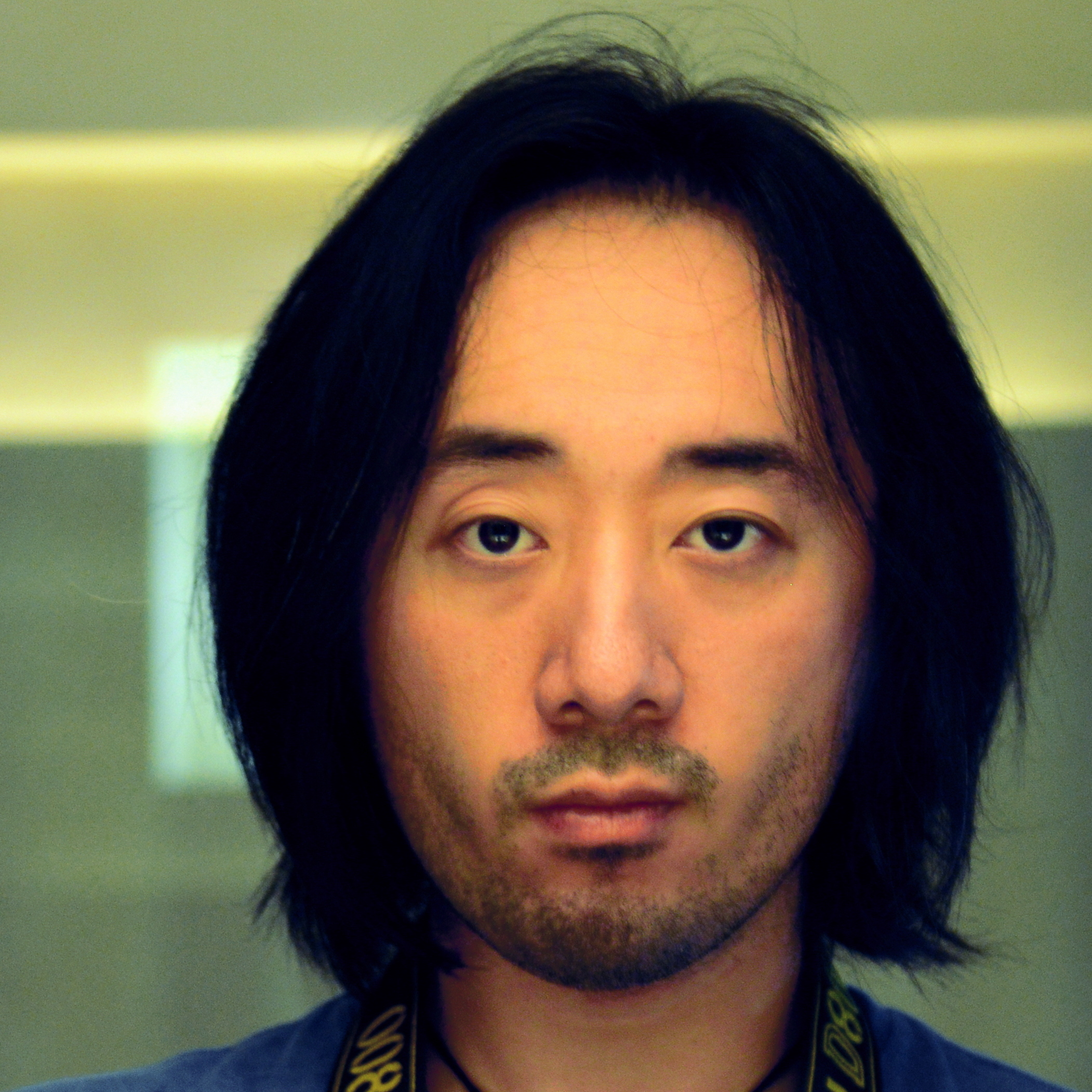
- Wang in 2013
- Born: November 2, 1977 (age 49); Beijing, China
- Other name: Gary
- Education: Duke University (B.S.); Princeton University (M.S., Ph.D.)
- Known for: ChucK programming language; Stanford Laptop Orchestra; Co-founder of Smule; music interaction design
- Scientific career
- Fields: Computer Music; Musical Interaction Design; Mobile Music; CS+Music Education
- Workplaces: Stanford University
- Thesis: The ChucK Audio Programming Language (2008)
- Doctoral advisor: Perry R. Cook

Chinese name
- Chinese: 王戈
Transcriptions
Standard Mandarin
- Hanyu Pinyin: Wáng Gē
- Website: ccrma.stanford.edu/~ge/

Ge Wang (born November 2, 1977) is a Chinese-American professor, musician, computer scientist, designer, and author. He is best known for inventing the ChucK audio programming language and for being the co-founder, chief technology officer (CTO), and chief creative officer (CCO) of Smule, a company making iPhone and iPad music apps.

== Career ==
Wang is also known for creating the Princeton Laptop Orchestra and later founded Stanford Laptop Orchestra, as well as the Stanford Mobile Phone Orchestra.

He is the designer of the Ocarina and Magic Piano iPhone apps. He is currently an associate professor at Stanford University’s Center for Computer Research in Music and Acoustics (CCRMA).

== Book ==
He is the author of Artful Design: Technology in Search of the Sublime (A MusiComic Manifesto), a book on design and technology, art and life, created entirely in the format of a photo comic book, published by Stanford University Press in 2018.
