= Larry Beauregard =

- Larry Beauregard at IRCAM, 1984

Background information
- Born: October 14, 1956; Brampton, Ontario, Canada
- Origin: Montreal, Quebec, Canada
- Died: September 4, 1985 (aged 28) Toulouse, France
- Genres: Contemporary classical
- Occupation: Flautist

Lawrence Michael "Larry" Beauregard (October 14, 1956 – September 4, 1985) was a Canadian flautist. He is best known for his work as first flute in the Ensemble InterContemporain, and for his work at IRCAM in the early 1980s, especially his collaboration with Barry Vercoe on the Synthetic Performer project.

== Biography ==
=== Early life and musical studies ===
Larry Beauregard was born in Brampton, Ontario, Canada, the third of six children of Jean-Pierre Beauregard, a French-Canadian aerospace engineer, and Irish-Canadian Michaela Moloney. He spent his childhood and teenage years in Montreal. He took up flute in his early teens, and was a private student of Abe Kestenberg (who also taught at the McGill Conservatory of Music), and Gail Grimstead at the Conservatoire de musique du Québec à Hull from which he graduated with a Premier Prix in 1977. In 1977, he moved to Paris to study under Alain Marion at the Conservatoire de Paris.

=== Professional career ===
Upon leaving the Conservatoire de Paris in 1980, Beauregard joined the Ensemble InterContemporain under Pierre Boulez as first flute. He also performed and recorded solo works for flute. His performance of Edgard Varèse's Density 21.5 is included on Sony Classical's Flute – Greatest Hits CD.

He also performed the live solo part of Steve Reich's "Vermont Counterpoint", accompanied by a multitrack recording of himself playing the other parts. After Beauregard's death in 1985, friend and fellow flautist Pierre-André Valade recorded the solo part and included the completed work on his CD (ADDA 581075), as did Claire Marchand on her CD 20th Century Works for Solo Flute (ATMA Classique ACD22175).

In the early 1980s, Beauregard was deeply involved in computer music research at the recently established IRCAM, modifying a flute with optical switches so that it could interface with the 4X computer-based audio synthesis and processing system. This eventually culminated in his work with Barry Vercoe on the Synthetic Performer, which was demonstrated at the ICMC in 1984.

Beauregard taught at several master classes, including Domaine Forget in his native Quebec.

=== Illness and death ===
In May 1985, he was diagnosed with late-stage colon cancer, and died on September 4, 1985. In his memory, the Lawrence Beauregard International Flute Competition was established; winners of the competition include Nina Perlove, Kaoru Hinata, and Myung Joo Ahn. Works composed in his memory include Pierre Boulez' Mémoriale (1985) for flute and ensemble, Philippe Manoury's Jupiter (1987) for flute and electronics, and Tim Brady's Requiem 21.5 (2009) for solo violin and orchestra.

== Discography ==
=== With the Ensemble InterContemporain ===
- Boulez Conducts Zappa: The Perfect Stranger (EMI)
- Boulez Conducts Stravinsky (Erato)
- Fire on the Mountain (Boulez conducting works by Varèse), (Masterworks)
- Varèse – Orchestral, Chamber & Vocal Works

=== Solo ===
- Flute Greatest Hits (Sony Classical), track 21, Density 21.5, Edgard Varèse
