= Giugno =

Giugno is the Italian word for the month of June. It is also an Italian surname. Notable people with the surname include:

- Francesco Giugno (1577–c.1621), Italian painter
- Giuseppe di Giugno (born 1937), Italian physicist
- Nicolas di Giugno (born 1988), Belgian footballer
