= I-CubeX =

Input device

I-CubeX comprises a system of sensors, actuators and interfaces that are configured by a personal computer. Using MIDI, Bluetooth or the Universal Serial Bus (USB) as the basis for all communication, the complexity is managed behind a variety of software tools, including an end-user configuration editor, Max (software) plugins, and a C++ Application Programming Interface (API), which allows applications to be developed in Mac OS X, Linux and Windows operating systems.

Usage is primarily focused on allowing exploration and construction of alternative physical computer interaction systems, but have most notably been adopted by music enthusiasts, as they greatly simplify musical instrument mods and creation of novel electronic musical instruments, MIDI controllers and audio control surfaces (such as presented at NIME), e.g. for electronic music generation, and visual artists, as they greatly simplify interactive installation art and electronic art (such as presented at Ars Electronica and SIGGRAPH). In both cases, it is extensively used for teaching. It allows the construction of complex interactive systems out of simpler components. I-CubeX is designed and produced by Infusion Systems.

== History ==
I-CubeX arose out of a research project in 1995 directed by Axel Mulder at the Department of Kinesiology, Simon Fraser University to address the need for better tools for artists to create interactive art and for musicians to more easily create or modify musical instruments. It was inspired by projects such as STEIM's Sensorlab. While I-CubeX helped opening up access to technology for artists interested in sensor technology, it in itself inspired others to create new technology.

The field evolved into physical computing and it was followed by the creation of a number of other generic platforms for applying sensor technology in the (performing) arts such as Arduino, as well as the development of very application specific sensors for human interfacing and human interface devices. While the focus of I-CubeX technology was initially on translating sensor signals to MIDI (Digitizer, microDig) for music enthusiasts, the transmission protocols now include Bluetooth Low Energy and WiFi (WiDig), Bluetooth Classic (Wi-microDig) and USB (WiDig, USB-microDig) so as to facilitate its use by all kinds of researchers and engineers, as well as MIDI.

== See also ==
- Electronic musical instruments
- MIDI controllers
- Audio control surface
- Sensors
- Multimodal interaction
- Human computer interaction
- Human interface device
- Assistive technology
- Brain-computer interface
