= FUDI =

Networking protocol

FUDI (Fast Universal Digital Interface) is a networking protocol used by the Pure Data patching language invented by Miller Puckette. It is a string-based protocol in which messages are separated by semicolons. Messages are made up of tokens separated by whitespaces, and numerical tokens are represented as strings.

== Format ==
FUDI is a packet-oriented protocol.

Each message consists of one or more atoms, separated by one or more whitespace characters, and it's terminated by a semicolon character.

An atom is a sequence of one or more characters; whitespaces inside atoms can be escaped by the backslash (ascii 92) character (see Examples below).

A whitespace is either a space (ascii 32), a tab (ascii 9) or a newline (ascii 10).

A semicolon (ascii 59) is mandatory to terminate (and send) a message. A newline is just treated as whitespace and not needed for message termination.

== Implementations ==
=== pdsend / pdreceive ===
Those command-line tools are distributed with the software Pure Data. They are meant to be used with their counterparts, the classes [netsend] / [netreceive] of Pd.

=== [netsend] / [netreceive] ===
Those classes can be used to transport Pd-messages over a TCP or UDP socket. Both are part of Pd-vanilla.

=== [netserver] / [netclient] ===
Those are part of maxlib and allow bidirectional connections of multiple clients with one server.

== Example messages ==
test/blah 123.453 my-slider 12;

hello this is a message;

this message continues
in the following
line;

you; can; send; multiple messages; in a line;

this\ is\ one\ whole\ atom;

this_atom_contains_a\
newline_character_in_it;
