= Graphics Environment for Multimedia =

Graphics libraries

- Original author: Mark Danks
- Developers: Günter Geiger, Institute of Electronic Music and Acoustics
- Stable release: 0.94 / March 15, 2019; 6 years ago
- Operating system: Linux, OS X, Win32 and IRIX
- License: GNU General Public License
- Website: gem.iem.at

Graphics Environment for Multimedia (GEM) is a set of externals (libraries) that provide OpenGL graphics functionality to Pure Data, a graphical programming language for real-time audio processing. It is free under the GNU General Public License (GPL).

Originally written by Mark Danks of Sony Computer Entertainment, it is now maintained by Johannes Zmölnig of the Institute of Electronic Music and Acoustics. It was once (but is no longer) partly supported by a grant from the Intel Research Council for The Global Visual Music project of Vibeke Sorensen, Miller Puckette and Rand Steiger.

The externals provide support for many objects, such as polygon graphics, lighting, texture mapping, image processing, and camera motion.

== See also ==
- Pure Data
- OpenGL
