= Peter Mauzey =

American electronic music professor and engineer

Peter Mauzey (born 1930 in Poughkeepsie, NY), is an electrical engineer associated with the development of electronic music in the 1950s and 1960s at the Columbia-Princeton Electronic Music Center. He served as an adjunct professor at Columbia University while employed as an engineer at Bell Labs (later Lucent Technologies) in New Jersey.

Mauzey began working with electronic music pioneer Vladimir Ussachevsky while still a student at Columbia in 1951. He worked at the university radio station WKCR, and introduced Ussachevsky to the use of magnetic tape feedback as a source and modifier of sound effects which could be incorporated into music.

He helped build the RCA Mark II Sound Synthesizer and became the first director of engineering at the new center in 1959. According to Thom Holmes' Electronic and Experimental Music: Technology, Music, and Culture he was "the lead engineer of the center". Mauzey and his staff developed a large variety of customized equipment designed to solve the needs of the composers working at the center. These include early prototypes of tape delay machines, quadraphonic mixing consoles, and analog triggers designed to facilitate interoperability between other (often custom-made) synthesizer equipment.

Robert Moog, who developed the music synthesizer into a practical instrument, learned his trade from Mauzey as a Columbia student in the early 1960s.
