= Philippe Manoury =

French composer (born 1952)

Philippe Manoury Composer
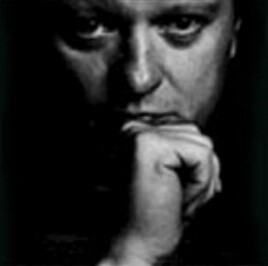
- Born: June 19, 1952 (age 74); Tulle, France
- Education: Ecole Normale de Musique de Paris; Conservatoire de Paris
- Organizations: IRCAM; University of California, San Diego
- Awards: Ordre des Arts et des Lettres
- Website: www.philippemanoury.com

Philippe Manoury (born 19 June 1952) is a French composer.

== Biography ==
Manoury was born on June 19, 1952, in Tulle, France, and began composition studies at the École Normale de Musique de Paris with Gérard Condé and Max Deutsch. He continued his studies from 1974 to 1978 at the Conservatoire de Paris with Michel Philippot, Ivo Malec, and Claude Ballif. In 1975, he undertook studies in computer-assisted composition with Pierre Barbaud, and joined IRCAM as a composer and electronic music researcher in 1980.

From 2004 until 2012, Manoury served on the composition faculty at the University of California, San Diego, where he taught composition, electronic music, and analysis in the graduate program. After retiring from UCSD, he returned to France, settling in Strasbourg.

== Music ==
Manoury's work is strongly influenced by Pierre Boulez, Karlheinz Stockhausen, and Iannis Xenakis, and his early work from 1972 to 1976 combines serial punctualism with dense sound masses characteristic of the music of Stockhausen and Xenakis, and the paintings of Jackson Pollock. Works such as Sound and Fury are of interest because of the use of computer-assisted composition. Sound and Fury also uses a very large orchestra, which is symmetrically disposed, and makes extensive use of spatial effects.

Since the 1980s, Manoury has been closely associated with the American computer researcher Miller Puckette, first at IRCAM and subsequently at UCSD. The Sonus ex machina series of works (Jupiter, Pluton, Neptune and La Partition du Ciel et de l'Enfer), developed in collaboration with Puckette, are among the first pieces to utilize real-time digital signal processing, and Pluton was the first ever composition using Puckette's visual programming language Max.

His Abgrund—pour grand orchestre was commissioned by the Bavarian State Opera together with the Montreal Symphony Orchestra and premiered by the Bavarian State Orchestra on November 26, 2007. It has been described as "a work that will neither disturb nor annoy [...] a pleasant and perhaps harmless string of dissonant semi-climaxes, little jolts, and resting phases. It has an invigorating effect, is easy to concentrate on . . .". In it "Manoury [...] mercifully knows how to use [the abundance of percussion instruments] in ways far more discriminately than his contemporaries beholden to one bongo-frenzy after another". "Philippe Manoury hit[s] the right mix between shallow and deep, melodic and dissonant, placating and strident, stasis and progress, simplicity and complexity. The steady run-up—stop—tighten—burst—relax scheme may not be novel at all, but it paid dividends [in 'Abgrund']".

== Writings ==
- Manoury, Philippe. 1998. La note et le son: Écrits et entretiens, 1981-1998, with a foreword by Danielle Cohen-Levinas. Musique et musicologie: Les dialogues. Paris: L'Harmattan. ISBN 2-7384-6985-X
- Manoury, Philippe. 2001. Entretiens avec Daniela Langer. Paris : Musica falsa. ISBN 2-9512386-3-0

== Selected compositions ==
Operas

- 60e parallèle for 9 singers, large orchestra and electronics (1995–96)
- K… (2001)
- La frontière, chamber opera for 6 singers, 9 instruments and electronics (2003)
- La nuit de Gutenberg, opera in a prologue and 12 scenes. Premiered at the Opéra national du Rhin, Strasbourg, 24 September 2011

Orchestral works

- Numéro huit, op. 8 (1980, revised 1987)
- Pentaphone, 5 Pieces for large orchestra, op. 24 (1993)
- Prelude and Wait (1995)
- Sound and Fury (1999)

Concertos

- Echo-Daimónon, for piano, electronics and large orchestra (2011–12)
- Bref Aperçu sur l'Infini for cello and orchestra (2015)

Chamber music

- Numéro cinq for piano and 13 instruments, op. 5 (1976)
- Instantanés (1983)
  - Version La Rochelle, op. 10a (1983)
  - Version étude, op. 10b (1983)
  - Version Baden-Baden, op. 10c (1985)
- La Partition du ciel and de l’enfer, op. 19 (1989)
- Passacaille pour Tokyo for piano and 17 instruments (1994)
- Fragments pour un portrait, 7 Pieces for ensemble of 30 instruments (1998)
- Épitaphe for 7 instruments, op. 29 (1995)
- Portrait of the Artist as a Young Man for 10 instruments (2004)
- Identités remarquables for 23 instruments (2005)
- Strange Ritual for 21 instruments (2005)
- Focus (1973)
- Le tempérament variable (1978)
- String Quartet, op. 6 (1978)
- Musique I for 2 harps, guitar, mandolin and 2 percussionists (1986)
- Musique II for 7 brass (2.2.2.1) and 2 marimbas, op. 14 (1986)
- Petit aleph (1986)
- Solo de vibraphone (1986)
- Le livre des claviers, Six pieces for 6 percussionists (1987)
- Deux mélodies (1988)
- Michigan Trio for clarinet, violin and piano (1992)
- Gestes for string trio (1992)
- Métal for sixxens sextett (1995)
- Ultima for clarinet, cello and piano (1996)
- Last for bass-clarinet and bass-marimba (1997)
- Stringendo for string quartet (2010)
- Chaconne for solo cello and 6 cellos (2015)

Live electronics

- Zeitlauf for choir, 14 instruments and electronics, op. 9 (1982)
- Jupiter for flute and live electronics, op. 15a (1987, revised 1992)
- Pluton for piano and live electronics (1988, revised 1989)
- Neptune for 3 percussionists and live electronics, op. 21 (1991)
- En écho for soprano and live electronics (1993–1994); words by Emmanuel Hocquart
- Partita I for viola and live electronics (2006)
- Tensio for string quartet and live electronics (2010)

Piano

- Sonata for 2 pianos (1972, revised 1994)
- Cryptophonos (1974)
- Puzzle (1975)
- Toccata (1998) from de « Passacaille pour Tokyo »
- La ville (...Première sonate) (2001–2002)
- Veränderungen (...Deuxième sonate...) (2007)

Vocal

- Aleph for 4 singers and orchestra (1985–87)
- Xanadu for soprano and clarinet (1989); words by Samuel Taylor Coleridge
- Chronophonies I and II for mezzo-soprano, baritone-bass and large orchestra (1994)
- Douze moments for mezzo-soprano and large orchestra (1998)
- Slova for choir (2001–2002)
- Fragments d'Héraclite for choir (2003)
- Noon for soprano, choir, large orchestra, and electronics (2003)
- Blackout, Melodrama for alto and 13 instruments (2004)
- On-iron for choir, electronics and video (2005)

== Discography ==
- "Fragments pour un portrait" – Ensemble Intercontemporain, Kairos, 0012922KAI, 2009
- Quatuor à cordes – Quatuor Arditti MFA, Harmonia Mundi, C 5139, 1984
- Cryptophonos – Claude Helffer (pno) MFA Harmonia Mundi, C 5172, 1986
- Petit Aleph – Pierre-André Valade (Flute), ADDA, 581 075, 1988
- Zeitlauf – Groupe Vocal de France, Ensemble Intercontemporain, conducted by Peter Eotvös, Erato, ECD, 75552, 1990
- Le livre des claviers – Les percussions de Strasbourg, Philips Classics, 444 218–2, 1993
- Epitaphe – Ensemble FA, conducted by Dominique My, MFA 216007, 1995
- Jupiter and La Partition du Ciel et de l'Enfer – Sophie Cherrier (flute) and Ensemble Intercontemporain. Conducted by Pierre Boulez. In Compositeurs d'aujourd'hui, Adès, 206 062, 1996
- Pluton – Ilmo Ranta, piano, Technique Ircam Ondine Records, ODE 888–2, 1996
- 60ème parallèle – Orchestre de Paris, conducted by David Robertson, Naxos 8.554249/50, 1997
- En écho and Neptune – Donatienne Michel-Dansac (soprano); Roland Auzet, Florent Jodelet, and Eve Payeur (percussion), Technique Ircam ACCORD, 465 526–2, 1998
- Complete Chamber Music – Ensemble Accroche Note, Assai 222052, 2002

== Awards and recognition ==
- Officier of the Ordre des Arts et des Lettres, 2014

== Bibliography ==
- Boulez, Pierre, and Patrick Greussay. 1988. "Entretien avec Philippe Manoury". Traverses, nos. 44–45:128–37
- Poirier, Alain. 2001. "Manoury, Philippe". The New Grove Dictionary of Music and Musicians, ed. S. Sadie and J. Tyrrell. London: Macmillan.
