= Giuseppe di Giugno =

Italian physicist (born 1937)

Giuseppe Di Giugno (born 1937 in Benghazi) is an Italian physicist. He graduated with a degree in physics from Rome University in 1961.

== Particle physics ==
From 1961 until 1975, Di Giugno was a researcher in the field of matter-antimatter interactions at the National Laboratory of Nuclear Physics at Frascati and at European Organization for Nuclear Research (CERN) at Geneva. He was actively involved in the design and realization of ADA, the first electron-positron storage ring.

He served as an associate professor first of "Physics Laboratory II" and then of "Structure of Matter" at the Physics Institute of Naples University from 1963 until 1975.

== Electroacoustics ==
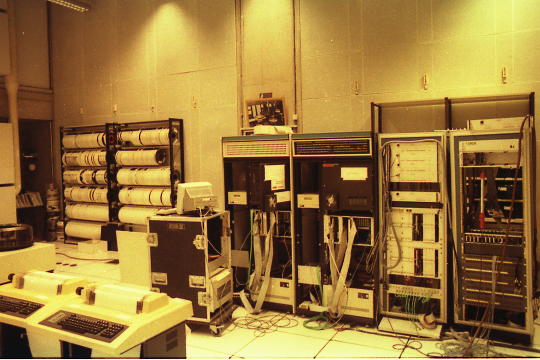
Sogitec 4X (center)
on IRCAM's machine room in 1989

Between 1970 and 1973, he progressively abandoned research on particle physics and turned his attention principally to electroacoustics and digital sound. He created a research center at the Naples University Physics Institute, where he developed numerous analog and digital systems controlled by a PDP11 computer for realtime generation and sound processing. In 1974, he met Luciano Berio, who invited him to IRCAM in Paris to create an Electroacoustic Centre; this marked the beginning of a collaboration that continued until 2000. At IRCAM, guided by the musical ideas of Pierre Boulez, di Giugno developed several prototypes of digital machines that in 1979 were consolidated in the "4X" system. This was the first entirely digital music workstation and it opened new horizons for music composition and performance. This system was used by Boulez, Nono and Stockhausen. To a certain extent it was a reference point for later digital instruments.

In 1988, Di Giugno returned to Italy to assume the direction of the IRIS research laboratory of the Bontempi-Farfisa group where, through 1999, he continued research in the field of large musical workstations, coordinating a Design Centre for the realization of specialized microprocessors handling digital sound signals.

The "MARS" work station and the "SMART" spatializer were realized during that period. Both systems were widely used at the time. Personal computers allow real-time emulation of the old hardware system.
