= Nicolas Di Giugno =

Belgian footballer

Personal information
- Date of birth: 1 July 1988 (age 38)
- Place of birth: Belgium
- Height: 1.77 m (5 ft 9 1/2 in)
- Position: Striker

Team information
- Current team: FC Gerpinnes

Senior career*
Years	Team	Apps	(Gls)
2008–2009	R. Charleroi S.C.	3	(0)
2009	Olympic Charleroi		
2010–	RJS Heppignies-Lambusart-Fleurus		
2023–2024	FC Gerpinnes		
- * Club domestic league appearances and goals as of 17 July 2009

Nicolas Di Giugno (born 1 July 1988) is a Belgian football striker. He play with a famous player: Mousset Alexandre.
