= ISPW =

The IRCAM Signal Processing Workstation (ISPW) was a hardware digital audio workstation developed by IRCAM and the Ariel Corporation in the late 1980s. In French, the ISPW is referred to as the SIM (Station d'informatique musicale). Eric Lindemann was the principal designer of the ISPW hardware as well as manager of the overall hardware/software effort.

It consisted of up to three customized DSP boards that could be plugged into the expansion bus on a NeXT Computer (a "cube"). The ISPW could then run a customized real-time audio processing server on the hardware boards controlled by a client application on the NeXT.

Each ISPW card had two Intel i860 microprocessors (running at 80 MFLOPS). An additional card with eight channels of audio I/O was also available for multi-channel sound recording and playback. A three-board ISPW provided what was at the time unsurpassed signal processing and audio synthesis power on a single workstation. A single ISPW card cost approximately $12,000US (not including the computer), which made it prohibitively expensive outside of research institutes and universities.

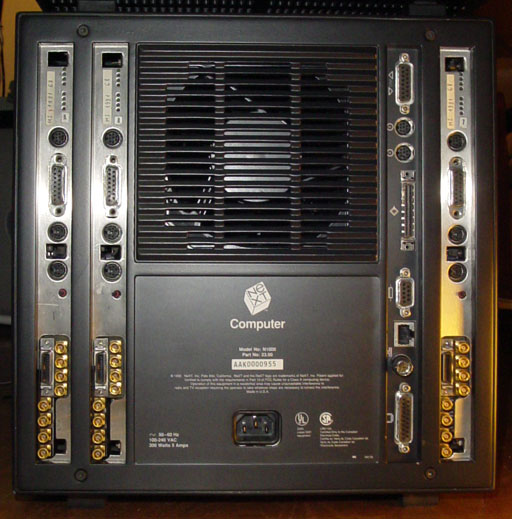

And the I860 board :

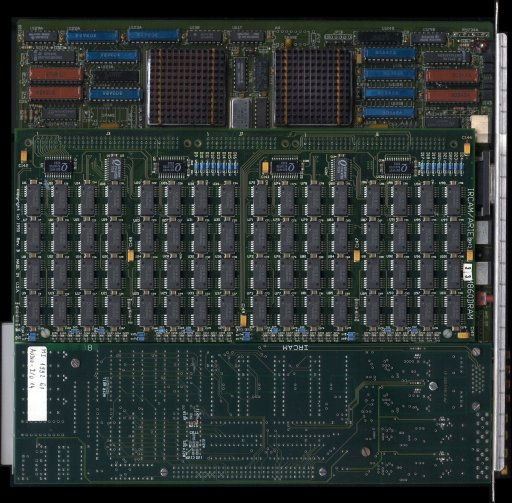

The main server software developed by IRCAM for the ISPW was called FTS ("Faster Than Sound"). The main NeXT client application was a graphical program called Max, developed by Miller Puckette. A commercial version of Max (without the FTS server) was licensed by IRCAM to Opcode Systems (and, later, Cycling '74).

Max/FTS eventually migrated to a software-only application for SGI and DEC Alpha computers. It is the direct predecessor to jMax.

See also Pd.
