= Max (programming language) =

Visual programming language

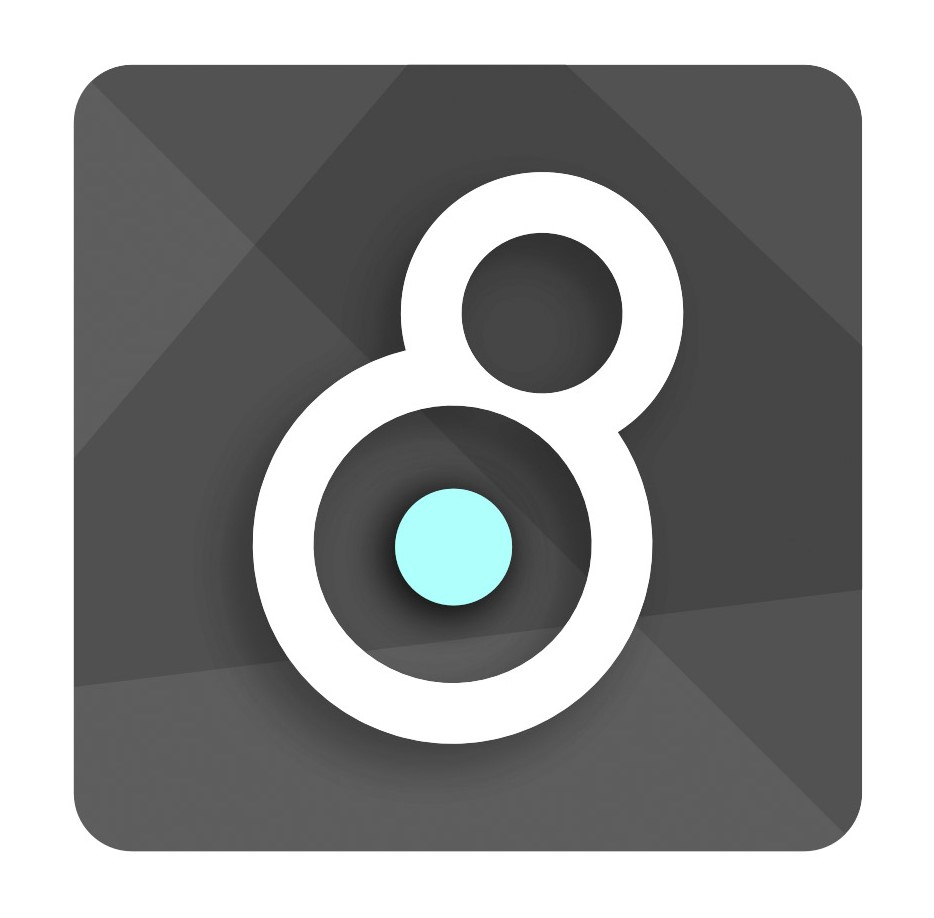
- Developer: Cycling '74
- Stable release: 9.0.5 / 4 March 2025
- Written in: C, C++ (on JUCE platform)
- Operating system: Microsoft Windows, macOS
- Type: Music and multimedia development
- License: Proprietary
- Website: cycling74.com/products/max

Max, also known as Max/MSP/Jitter, is a visual programming language for music and multimedia developed and maintained by San Francisco-based software company Cycling '74. Over its more than thirty-year history, it has been used by composers, performers, software designers, researchers, and artists to create recordings, performances, and installations.

The Max program is modular, with most routines existing as shared libraries. An application programming interface (API) allows third-party development of new routines (named external objects). Thus, Max has a large user base of programmers unaffiliated with Cycling '74 who enhance the software with commercial and non-commercial extensions to the program. Because of this extensible design, which simultaneously represents both the program's structure and its graphical user interface (GUI), Max has been described as the lingua franca for developing interactive music performance software.

== History ==
=== 1980s ===
Miller Puckette began work on Max in 1985, at the Institut de Recherche et Coordination Acoustique/Musique (IRCAM) in Paris. Originally called The Patcher, this first version provided composers with a graphical interface for creating interactive computer music scores on the Macintosh. At this point in its development Max couldn't perform its own real-time sound synthesis in software, but instead sent control messages to external hardware synthesizers and samplers using MIDI or a similar protocol. Its earliest widely recognized use in composition was for Pluton, a 1988 piano and computer piece by Philippe Manoury; the software synchronized a computer to a piano and controlled a Sogitec 4X for audio processing.

In 1989, IRCAM developed Max/FTS ("Faster Than Sound"), a version of Max ported to the IRCAM Signal Processing Workstation (ISPW) for the NeXT. Also known as "Audio Max", it would prove a forerunner to Max's MSP audio extensions, adding the ability to do real-time synthesis using an internal hardware digital signal processor (DSP) board. In 1989, IRCAM worked with Joel Chadabe and Ben Austin of Intelligent Computer Music Systems to license the software for commercial sales in the United States. With the 1990 bankruptcy of Intelligent Computer Music Systems, both the Max Software and Ben Austin moved to Opcode Systems, which became the publisher of record for Max.

=== 1990s ===
Although Opcode launched its commercial version named Max in 1990, developed and extended by David Zicarelli, the product was becoming a poor fit for Opcode, which was squarely towards commercial music production. Thus Zicarelli in 1997 acquired the publishing rights and founded a new company, Cycling '74, to continue commercial development. The timing was fortunate, as Opcode was acquired by Gibson Guitar in 1998 and ended operations in 1999.

IRCAM's in-house Max development was also winding down; the last version produced there was jMax, a direct descendant of Max/FTS developed in 1998 for Silicon Graphics (SGI) and later for Linux systems. It used Java for its graphical interface and C for its real-time backend, and was eventually released as open-source software.

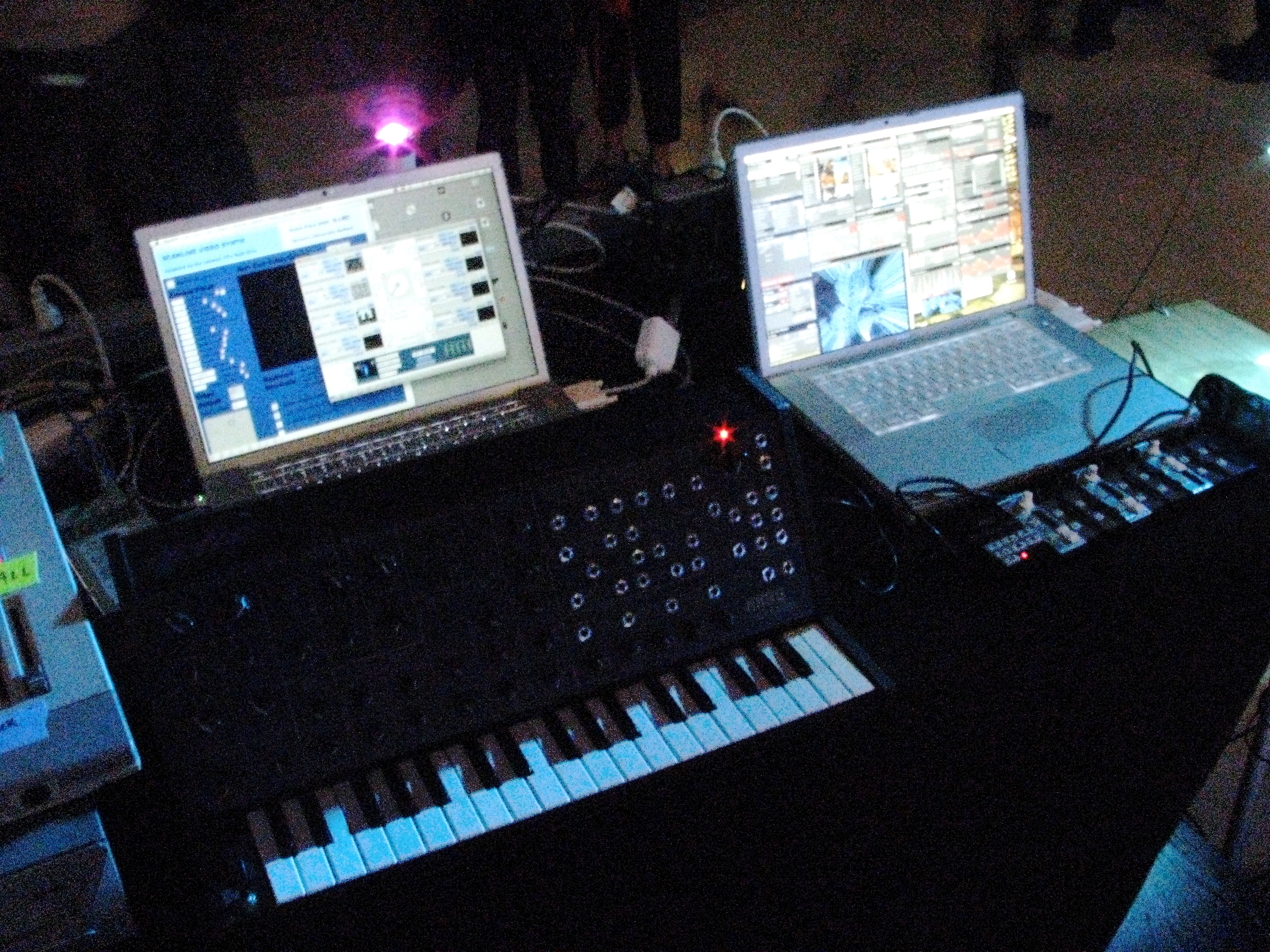
Various synthesizers and instruments connected to Max

Meanwhile, Puckette had independently released a fully redesigned open-source composition tool named Pure Data (Pd) in 1996, which, despite some underlying engineering differences from the IRCAM versions, continued in the same tradition. Cycling '74's first Max release, in 1997, was derived partly from Puckette's work on Pure Data. Called Max/MSP ("Max Signal Processing", or the initials Miller Smith Puckette), it remains the most notable of Max's many extensions and incarnations: it made Max capable of manipulating real-time digital audio signals without dedicated DSP hardware. This meant that composers could now create their own complex synthesizers and effects processors using only a general-purpose computer like the Macintosh PowerBook G3.

In 1999, the Netochka Nezvanova collective released NATO.0+55+3d, a suite of externals that added extensive real-time video control to Max.

=== 2000s ===
Though NATO.0+55+3d became increasingly popular among multimedia artists, its development stopped abruptly in 2001. SoftVNS, another set of extensions for visual processing in Max, was released in 2002 by Canadian media artist David Rokeby. Cycling '74 released their own set of video extensions, Jitter, alongside Max 4 in 2003, adding real-time video, OpenGL graphics, and matrix processing capabilities. Max 4 was also the first version to run on Windows. Max 5, released in 2008, redesigned the patching GUI for the first time in Max's commercial history.

=== 2010s ===
In 2011, Max 6 added a new audio engine compatible with 64-bit operating systems, integration with Ableton Live sequencer software, and an extension called Gen, which can compile optimized Max patches for higher performance. Max 7 was released in 2014 and focused on 3D rendering improvements.

On June 6, 2017, Ableton announced its purchase of Cycling '74, with Max continuing to be published by Cycling '74 and David Zicarelli remaining with the company.

On September 25, 2018, Max 8 was released. Some of the new features include MC, a new way to work with multiple channels, JavaScript support with Node for Max, and Vizzie 2.

=== 2020s ===
On October 29, 2024, Max 9, the most recent major version of the software, was released.

== Language ==
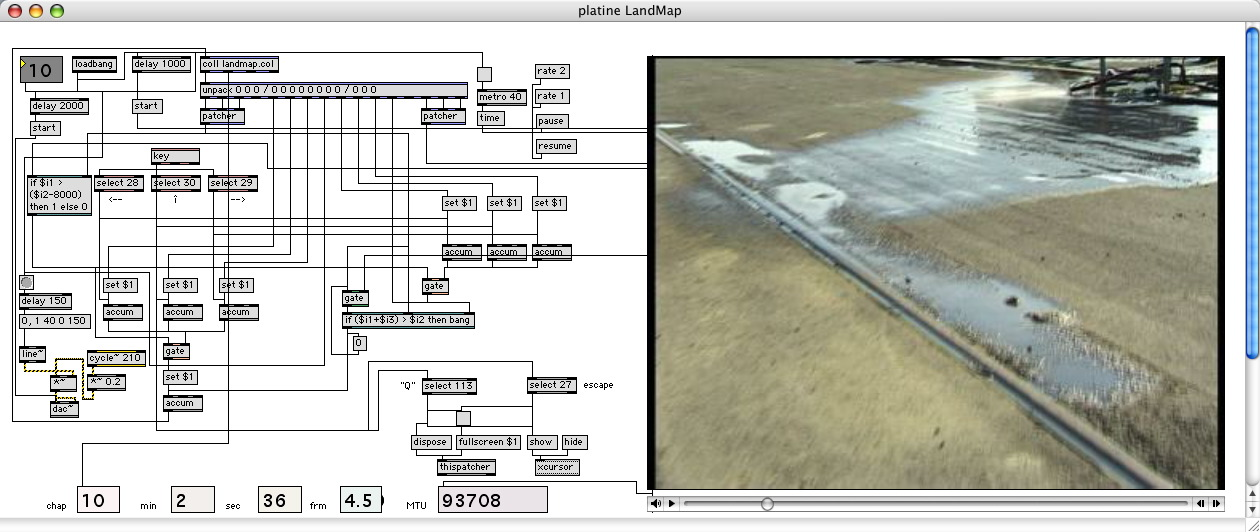
Screenshot of an older Max/Msp interface

Max is named after composer Max Mathews, and can be considered a descendant of his MUSIC language, though its graphical nature disguises that fact. Like most MUSIC-N languages, Max distinguishes between two levels of time: that of an event scheduler, and that of the DSP (this corresponds to the distinction between k-rate and a-rate processes in Csound, and control rate vs. audio rate in SuperCollider).

The basic language of Max and its sibling programs is that of a data-flow system: Max programs (named patches) are made by arranging and connecting building-blocks of objects within a patcher, or visual canvas. These objects act as self-contained programs (in reality, they are dynamically linked libraries), each of which may receive input (through one or more visual inlets), generate output (through visual outlets), or both. Objects pass messages from their outlets to the inlets of connected objects.

Max supports six basic atomic data types that can be transmitted as messages from object to object: int, float, list, symbol, bang, and signal (for MSP audio connections). Several more complex data structures exist within the program for handling numeric arrays (table data), hash tables (coll data), XML information (pattr data), and JSON-based dictionaries (dict data). An MSP data structure (buffer~) can hold digital audio information within program memory. In addition, the Jitter package adds a scalable, multi-dimensional data structure for handling large sets of numbers for storing video and other datasets (matrix data).

Max is typically learned through acquiring a vocabulary of objects and how they function within a patcher; for example, the metro object functions as a simple metronome, and the random object generates random integers. Most objects are non-graphical, consisting only of an object's name and several arguments-attributes (in essence class properties) typed into an object box. Other objects are graphical, including sliders, number boxes, dials, table editors, pull-down menus, buttons, and other objects for running the program interactively. Max/MSP/Jitter comes with about 600 of these objects as the standard package; extensions to the program can be written by third-party developers as Max patchers (e.g. by encapsulating some of the functionality of a patcher into a sub-program that is itself a Max patch), or as objects written in C, C++, Java, or JavaScript.

The order of execution for messages traversing through the graph of objects is defined by the visual organization of the objects in the patcher itself. As a result of this organizing principle, Max is unusual in that the program logic and the interface as presented to the user are typically related, though newer versions of Max provide several technologies for more standard GUI design.

Max documents (named patchers) can be bundled into stand-alone applications and distributed free or sold commercially. In addition, Max can be used to author audio and MIDI plugin software for Ableton Live through the Max for Live extension.

With the increased integration of laptop computers into live music performance (in electronic music and elsewhere), Max/MSP and Max/Jitter have received attention as a development environment available to those serious about laptop music/video performance. Programs sharing Max's visual programming concepts are now commonly used for real-time audio and video synthesis and processing.

== See also ==
- Pure Data
- Comparison of audio synthesis environments
- List of music software
- Visual programming language
