= Miller Puckette =

American computer scientist and musician (born 1959)

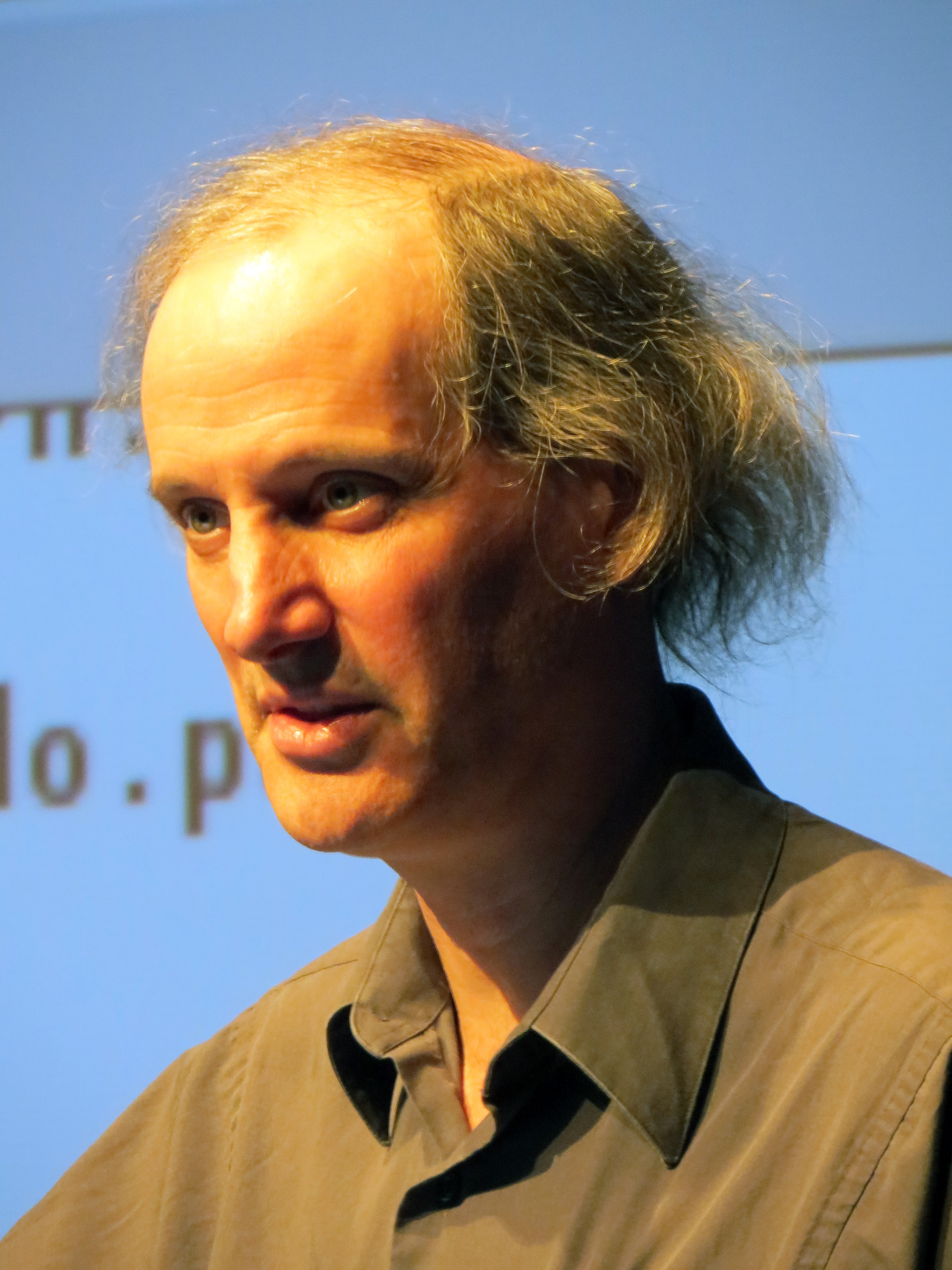
Miller Puckette at the Linux Audio Conference 2014 at ZKM Center for Art and Media Karlsruhe

Miller Smith Puckette (born 1959) is an American computer scientist and musician. Puckette is best known for authoring Max, a visual programming language for music and multimedia, which he initially developed while working at IRCAM in Paris in the late 1980s. He is also the author of Pure Data (Pd), an open source successor to Max written in the 1990s with input from many others in the computer music and free software communities. Puckette is professor emeritus of computer music at the University of California, San Diego, and was the associate director of the university's Center for Research in Computing and the Arts from 2000 until its closure in 2011.

== Biography ==
Puckette was born in 1959 in Chattanooga, Tennessee. An alumnus of St. Andrew's-Sewanee School in Sewanee, Tennessee, he first became involved with computer music through Barry Vercoe while an undergraduate at the Massachusetts Institute of Technology. In 1979, he became a Putnam Fellow. He earned a Ph.D. in mathematics from Harvard University in 1986. He was a member of the MIT Media Lab from its opening in 1985 until 1987 before continuing his research at IRCAM in Paris, and since 1997 has been a part of the Global Visual Music project. He developed the first version of Max in 1988 while working with composer Philippe Manoury at IRCAM.

Puckette is the 2008 SEAMUS Award Recipient. On May 11, 2011, he received an honorary doctorate from the University of Mons. On July 21, 2012, he received an Honorary Degree from Bath Spa University. He was the recipient of the Gold Medal at the 1975 Math Olympiads and the Silver Medal at the 1976 Math Olympiads. He was presented with a Silver Lion in music at the 2023 Venice Biennale.

== Selected publications ==
For a full list, see: http://msp.ucsd.edu/publications.html

- Puckette, Miller (2007). The theory and technique of electronic music. World Scientific. ISBN 978-981-270-077-3.
- Puckette, Miller (2004) “Who Owns our Software?: A first-person case study” Proceedings, ISEA, pp. 200–202, republished in September 2009 issue of Montréal: Communauté électroacoustique canadienne / Canadian Electroacoustic Community.
- Puckette, Miller (2002) "Max at Seventeen". Computer Music Journal 26(4): pp. 31–43.
