= List of audio programming languages =

Programming languages optimized for sound production

This is a list of notable programming languages optimized for sound production, algorithmic composition, and sound synthesis.

- ABC notation, a language for notating music using the ASCII character set
- Bol Processor, a model of formal grammars enriched with polymetric expressions for the representation of time structures
- ChucK, strongly timed, concurrent, and on-the-fly audio programming language
- Real-time Cmix, a MUSIC-N synthesis language somewhat similar to Csound
- Cmajor, a high-performance JIT-compiled C-style language for DSP
- Common Lisp Music (CLM), a music synthesis and signal processing package in the Music V family
- Csound, a MUSIC-N synthesis language released under the LGPL with many available unit generators
- Extempore, a live-coding environment that borrows a core foundation from the Impromptu environment
- FAUST, Functional Audio Stream, a functional compiled language for efficient real-time audio signal processing
- GLICOL, a graph-oriented live coding language written in Rust
- Hierarchical Music Specification Language (HMSL), optimized more for music than synthesis, developed in the 1980s in Forth
- Impromptu, a Scheme language environment for Mac OS X capable of sound and video synthesis, algorithmic composition, and 2D and 3D graphics programming
- Ixi lang, a programming language for live coding musical expression.
- JFugue, a Java and JVM library for programming music that outputs to MIDI and has the ability to convert to formats including ABC Notation, Lilypond, and MusicXML
- jMusic
- JSyn
- Keykit, a programming language and portable graphical environment for MIDI music composition
- Kyma (sound design language)
- LilyPond, a computer program and file format for music engraving.
- Max/MSP, a proprietary, modular visual programming language aimed at sound synthesis for music
- Mercury, a language for live-coding algorithmic music.
- Music Macro Language (MML), often used to produce chiptune music in Japan
- MUSIC-N, includes versions I, II, III, IV, IV-B, IV-BF, V, 11, and 360
- Nyquist
- OpenMusic
- Pure Data, a modular visual programming language for signal processing aimed at music creation
- TidalCycles, a live coding environment for algorithmic patterns, written in Haskell and using Supercollider for synthesis
- Reaktor
- Sonic Pi
- Structured Audio Orchestra Language (SAOL), part of the MPEG-4 Structured Audio standard
- Strudel
- SuperCollider
- SynthEdit, a modular visual programming language for signal processing aimed at creating audio plug-ins

== See also ==
- Comparison of audio synthesis environments
- List of music software
