= Comparison of audio synthesis environments =

Software audio synthesis environments typically consist of an audio programming language (which may be graphical) and a user environment to design/run the language in. Although many of these environments are comparable in their abilities to produce high-quality audio, their differences and specialties are what draw users to a particular platform. This article compares noteworthy audio synthesis environments, and enumerates basic issues associated with their use.

== Subjective comparisons ==
Audio synthesis environments comprise a wide and varying range of software and hardware configurations. Even different versions of the same environment can differ dramatically. Because of this broad variability, certain aspects of different systems cannot be directly compared. Moreover, some levels of comparison are either very difficult to objectively quantify, or depend purely on personal preference.

Some of the commonly considered subjective attributes for comparison include:

- Usability (how difficult is it for beginners to generate some kind of meaningful output)
- Learnability (how steep the learning curve is for new, average, and advancing users)
- Sound "quality" (which environment produces the most subjectively appealing sound)
- Creative flow (in what ways does the environment affect the creative process - e.g. guiding the user in certain directions)

These attributes can vary strongly depending on the tasks used for evaluation.

Some other common comparisons include:

- Audio performance (issues such as throughput, latency, concurrency, etc.)
- System performance (issues such as buggyness or stability)
- Support and community (who uses the system and who provides help, advice, training and tutorials)
- System capabilities (what is possible and what is not possible [regardless of effort] with the system)
- Interoperability (how well does the system integrate with other systems from different vendors)

=== Building blocks of sound and sound "quality" ===
Audio software often has a slightly different "sound" when compared against others. This is because there are different ways to implement the basic building blocks (such as sinewaves, pink noise, or FFT) which result in slightly different aural characteristics. Although people can of course prefer one system's "sound" over another, perhaps the best output can be determined by using sophisticated audio analyzers in combination with the listener's ears. The idea of this would be to arrive at what most would agree is as "pure" a sound as possible.

=== User interface ===
The interface to an audio system often has a significant influence on the creative flow of the user, not because of what is possible (the stable/mature systems listed here are fully featured enough to be able to achieve an enormous range of sonic/compositional objectives), but because of what is made easy and what is made difficult. This is again very difficult to boil down to a brief comparative statement. One issue may be which interface metaphors are used (e.g. boxes-and-wires, documents, flow graphs, hardware mixing desks).

== General ==
Name	Creator	Primary purpose(s)	First release date	Most recent update	Most recent version	Cost	License	Main user interface type	Development status
Bidule	Plogue	Realtime synthesis, live coding, algorithmic composition, acoustic research, all-purpose programming language	2002	2017-06	0.9757	Non-free	Proprietary	Graphical	Mature
ChucK	Ge Wang and Perry Cook	Realtime synthesis, live coding, pedagogy, acoustic research, algorithmic composition	2004	2023-12	1.5.2.1	Free	GPL	Document	Immature
Csound	Barry Vercoe	Realtime performance, sound synthesis, algorithmic composition, acoustic research	1986	2022-10-22	v6.18.0	Free	LGPL	Document, graphical	Mature
Impromptu	Andrew Sorensen	Live coding, algorithmic composition, hardware control, realtime synthesis, 2d/3d graphics programming	2006	2010-10	v2.5	Free	Proprietary	Document	Stable
Keykit	Tim Thompson	MIDI synthesis and algorithmic composition	1995	2021-03-15	v7.7e	Free	GPL	Graphical	Mature
Kyma	Carla Scaletti	Realtime audio synthesis, hardware control, acoustic research, algorithmic composition, data sonification, live-performance multi-effects processing	1986	2018-9-03	v7.23	Non-free	Proprietary	Graphical	Mature
Max/MSP	Miller Puckette	Realtime audio + video synthesis, hardware control, GUI design	1980s (mid)	2024-01-17	v8.6.0	Non-free	Proprietary	Graphical	Mature
Pure Data	Miller Puckette	Realtime synthesis, hardware control, acoustic research	1990s	2023-07-04	v0.54	Free	BSD-like	Graphical	Mature
Reaktor	Native Instruments	Realtime synthesis, hardware control, GUI design	1996	2023-04-19	6.5	Non-free	Proprietary	Graphical	Mature
SuperCollider	James McCartney	Realtime synthesis, live coding, algorithmic composition, acoustic research, all-purpose programming language	1996-03	2023-02-19	v3.13.0	Free	GPL	Document	Mature
Sporth	Paul Batchelor	Sound design, algorithmic composition, live coding, embedded systems	2015	2016-05	-	Free	MIT	Document	Immature
SynthEdit	Jeff McClintock	Realtime synthesis, live coding, effects coding, GUI design	1999	2025	1.4	Non-free	Proprietary/BSD	Graphical	Mature
VCV Rack	Andrew Belt	Realtime audio synthesis	2017-09	2022-02-26	2.1.0	Free	GPL	Graphical	Immature

== Programming language features ==
Name	Textual/graphical	Object-oriented	Type system
Bidule	Graphical	No	
ChucK	Textual	Yes	Static
Csound	Textual/Graphical (FLTK/Qt/HTML5)	No	In development
Impromptu	Mostly textual	—	Dynamic & static
Kyma	Mostly Graphical	Yes	Dynamic
Max/MSP	Graphical	No	
Pure Data	Graphical	No	
Reaktor	Graphical	No	
SuperCollider	Textual/Graphical (Cocoa/Swing/Qt)	Yes	Dynamic
SynthEdit	Graphical	Yes	Static
MPEG-4/SA	Textual	No	No

== Data interface methods ==
Interfaces between the language environment and other software or hardware (not user interfaces).

Name	Shell scripting		MIDI		OSC		HID	VST	Audio Units		Other
Name	In	Out	In	Out	In	Out	HID	VST	As host	As unit	Other
Bidule			Yes	Yes	Yes	Yes	Yes	Yes	Yes	Yes	
ChucK	Yes	Yes	Yes	Yes	Yes	Yes	Yes				Chunity allows to run ChucK in the Unity game engine
Csound	Yes	Yes	Yes	Yes	Yes	Yes		No			binding from Haskell (hCsound), C, C++, Java, JavaScript, Lisp, Lua, Python
Impromptu			Yes	Yes	Yes	Yes			Yes	No	Bidirectional Scheme to Objective-C bridge
Kyma			Yes	Yes	Yes	Yes	Yes				
Max/MSP			Yes	Yes	Yes	Yes	Yes	Yes	Yes		
Pure Data	Yes	Yes	Yes	Yes	Yes	Yes	Yes	Yes	Some	Some	bindings for GStreamer, Java, Lua, Python; the Camomile plug-in may host PD as plug-in within DAW; PD-extended presently has multiple options to host LADSPA plug-ins within PD environment
Reaktor			Yes	Yes	Yes	Yes		Yes	No	Yes	
SuperCollider	Yes	Yes	Yes	Yes	Yes	Yes	Yes		No	Yes	LADSPA Host, scsynth can be controlled by OSC messages (Haskell, Scala, Python, Ruby, Scheme etc.)
SynthEdit			Yes	Yes	No	No		Yes	No	Yes	
VCV Rack			Yes	Yes	Yes	Yes		Yes			

== Technical ==
Name	Operating system(s)	Source code language(s)	Programming (plug-in) API language(s)	Other technical features
Bidule	macOS, Windows	C++	C++	ASIO/ CoreAudio (Mac)/ ReWire support. Possible to write custom modules via API if NDA accepted.
ChucK	macOS, Linux, Windows	C++	C++	Unified timing mechanism (no separation between audio-rate and control-rate), command-line access
Csound	macOS, Linux, Windows	C, C++	C; also C++, Java, Lisp, Lua, Python, Tcl	IDE (QuteCsound), multitrack interface (blue); several analysis/resynthesis facilities; can compute double-precision audio; Python and LuaJIT algorithmic composition library; multi-threaded processing
Impromptu	macOS	Lisp, Objective-C, Scheme	C, C++, Objective-C, Scheme	Native access to most macOS APIs including Core Image, Quartz, QuickTime and OpenGL. Impromptu also includes its own statically typed (inferencing) systems language for heavy numeric processing - OpenGL, RT AudioDSP etc.
Kyma	macOS, Windows	Smalltalk, C, Objective-C	Smalltalk	The Kyma hardware processes user algorithms at sample-rate, as opposed to a vector of samples Kyma has a Frequency resolution of .0026 Hz, and large multi-dimensional arrays can be transferred through spectral algorithms at the speed of a single Frame.
Max/MSP	macOS, Windows	C, Objective-C	C, Java, JavaScript, also Python and Ruby via externals	
Pure Data	macOS, Linux, Windows, iPod, Android	C, Tcl (for GUI)	C, C++, FAUST, Haskell, Java, Lua, Python, Q, Ruby, Scheme, others	
Reaktor	macOS, Windows			
SuperCollider	macOS, Linux, Windows, FreeBSD	C, C++, Objective-C	C++	Client-server architecture; client and server can be used independently, command-line access
Sporth	Linux, macOS	C	C, Scheme	Many frontends built using the API exist, including Chuck, PD, and LADSPA
SynthEdit	Windows, macOS	C++	C++	
VCV Rack	macOS, Linux, Windows	C++	C++	

== See also ==
- List of music software
- List of audio programming languages
