= Programming (music) =

Electronic reproduction of musical sounds

Programming is a form of music production and performance using electronic devices and computer software, such as sequencers and workstations or hardware synthesizers, sampler and sequencers, to generate sounds of musical instruments. These musical sounds are created through the use of music coding languages. There are many music coding languages of varying complexity. Music programming is also frequently used in modern pop and rock music from various regions of the world, and sometimes in jazz and contemporary classical music. It gained popularity in the 1950s and has been emerging ever since.

Music programming is the process in which a musician produces a sound or "patch" (be it from scratch or with the aid of a synthesizer/sampler), or uses a sequencer to arrange a song.

== Coding languages ==
Music coding languages are used to program the electronic devices to produce the instrumental sounds they make. Each coding language has its own level of difficulty and function.

=== Alda ===
The music coding language Alda provides a tutorial on coding music and is, "designed for musicians who do not know how to program, as well as programmers who do not know how to music". The website also has links to install, tutorial, cheat sheet, docs, and community for anyone visiting the website.

=== LC ===
LC computer music programming language is a more complex computer music programming language meant for more experienced coders. One of the differences between this language and other music coding languages is that, "Unlike existing unit-generator languages, LC provides objects as well as library functions and methods that can directly represent microsounds and related manipulations that are involved in microsound synthesis."

== History and development ==
Music programming has had a vast history of development leading to the creation of different programs and languages. Each development comes with more function and utility and each decade tends to favor a certain program and or piece of equipment.

=== MUSIC-N ===
The first digital synthesis family of computer programs and languages being MUSIC-N created by Max Mathews. The development of these programs, allowed for more flexibility and utility, eventually leading them to become fully developed languages. As programs such as MUSIC I, MUSIC II and MUSIC III were developed, which were all created by Max Matthews, new technologies were incorporated in such as the table-lookup oscillator in MUSIC II and the unit generator in MUSIC III. The breakthrough technologies such as the unit generator, which acted as a building block for music programming software, and the acoustic compiler, which allowed "unlimited number of sound synthesis structures to be created in the computer", further the complexity and evolution of music programming systems.

=== Drum machines ===
Between the late 1960s and 1970s, electric rhythm machines began to make way into popular music. These machines began to gain much traction among various artists as they saw it as a way to create percussion sounds in an easier and more efficient way. Artists who used this kind of technology include J. J. Cale, Sly Stone, Yellow Magic Orchestra, Phil Collins, Marvin Gaye, Afrika Bambaataa and Prince. Some of the popular drum machines used between the late 1960s and 1970s included Ace Tone's Rhythm Ace, Korg's Doncamatic, Maestro's Rhythm King, and the Roland CR-78.

In 1980, the Roland TR-808 was released. It was the first drum machine with which users could program a percussion track from beginning to end, complete with breaks and rolls. The 808 imitates acoustic percussion: the bass drum, snare, toms, conga, rimshot, claves, handclap, maraca, cowbell, cymbal and hi-hat (open and closed). The 808 is a foundational element of hip-hop, having been described as hip-hop's equivalent to what the Fender Stratocaster guitar was to rock music. The 808 has been used on more hit records than any other drum machine, and is one of the most influential inventions in popular music.

The same year, the LM-1 drum machine computer was released by guitarist Roger Linn, its goal being to help artists achieve realistic sounding drum sounds using digital samples. This drum machine had eight different drum sounds: kick drum, snare, hi-hat, cabasa, tambourine, two tom toms, two congas, cowbell, clave, and handclaps. The different sounds could be recorded individually and they sounded real because of the high frequencies of the sound (28 kHz). Some notable artists who used the LM-1 were Peter Gabriel, Stevie Wonder, Michael Jackson, and Madonna.

These developments continued to happen in future decades leading to the creation of new electrical instruments such as the Theremin, Hammond organ, electric guitar, synthesizer, and digital sampler. Other technologies such as the phonograph, tape-recorder, and compact disc have enabled artists to create and produce sounds without the use of live musicians.

=== Music programming in the 1980s ===
The music programming innovations of the 1980s brought many new unique sounds to this style of music. Popular music sounds during this time were the gated reverb, synthesizers, drum machines with 1980s sounds, vocal reverb, delay, and harmonization, and master bus mix downs and tape. Music programming began to emerge around this time which drew up controversy. Many artists were adapting more towards this technology and the traditional way music was made and recorded began to change. For instance, many artists began to record their beats by programming instead of recording a live drummer.

=== Music programming in the early 2000s ===
Today, music programming is very common, with artists using software on a computer to produce music and not actually using physical instruments. These different programs are called digital audio workstations (DAW) and are used for editing, recording, and mixing music files. Most DAW programs incorporate the use of MIDI technology, which allows for music production software to carry out communication between electronic instruments, computers, and other related devices. While most DAWs carry out the same function and do the same thing, there are some that require less expertise and are easier for beginners to operate. These programs can be run on personal computers. Popular DAWs include: FL Studio, Avid Pro Tools, Apple Logic Pro X, Magix Acid Pro, Ableton Live, Presonus Studio One, Magix Samplitude Pro X, Cockos Reaper, Propellerhead Reason, Steinberg Cubase Pro, GarageBand, and Bitwig Studio.

== Equipment ==
- Technology: digital audio workstation, drum machine, groovebox, sampler, sequencer, synthesizer and MIDI
