= Benoît and the Mandelbrots =

Computer music brand

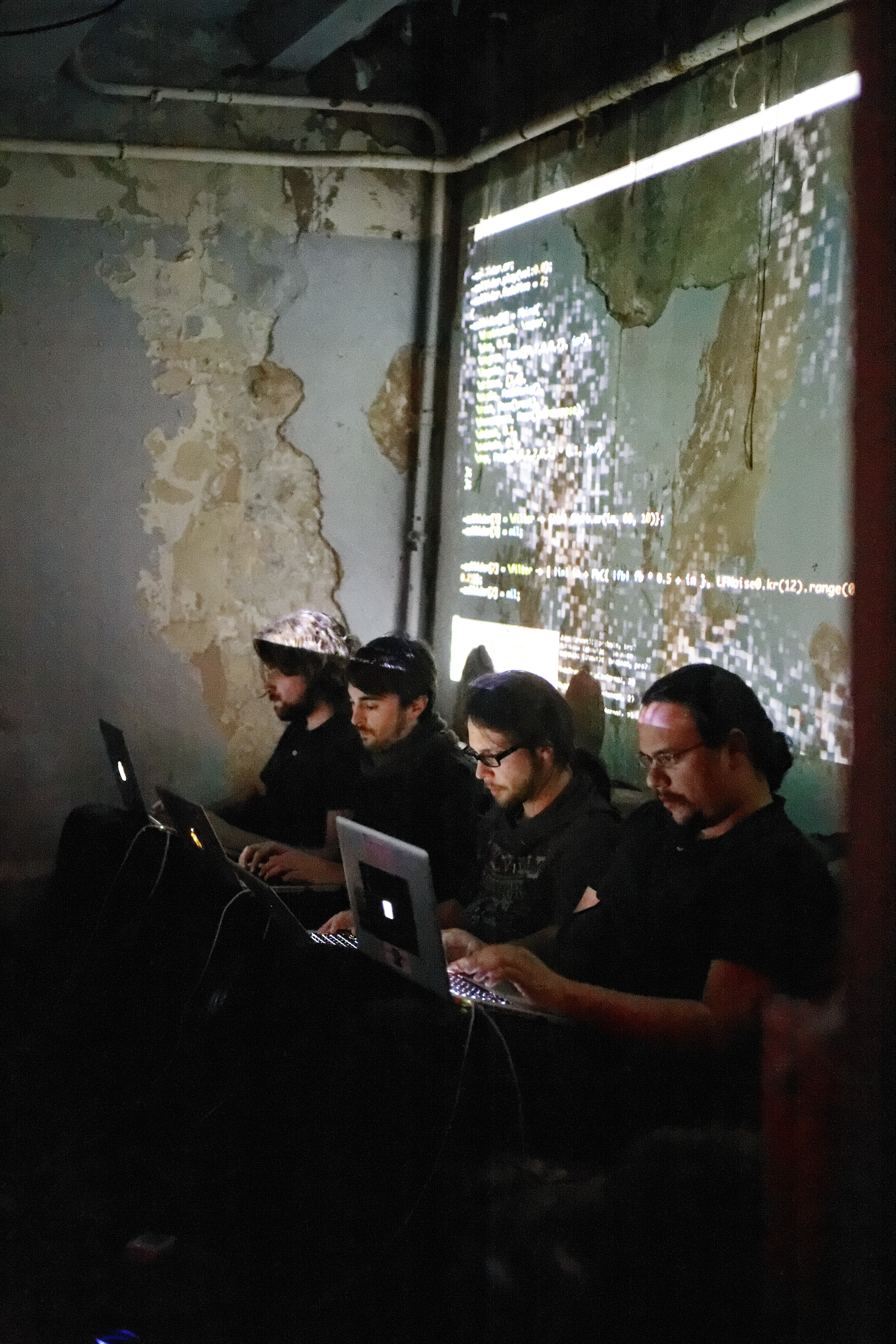
Benoit and the Mandelbrots performing at the SuperCollider Symposium, 2012

Benoît and the Mandelbrots, named after French American mathematician Benoît Mandelbrot, is a Computer Music band formed in 2009 in Karlsruhe, Germany. They are known for their live coded and Algorave performances, the Digital Arts practice of improvising with programming languages that gradually dissolves the distinction between composer and performer.

The band consists of Juan A. Romero, Holger Ballweg, Patrick Borgeat and Matthias Schneiderbanger, who met while studying at the Institute for Musicology and Music Informatics at the University of Music Karlsruhe in Germany. They perform live using the SuperCollider programming language, writing code to improvise music in a range of electronic music genres, from techno to noise.

As an improvising group focused on live performance, they have performed at major venues on the international stage, and were recognised with an honorary mention at the highly prestigious Prix Ars Electronica awards in 2012, and had a live recording published by the esteemed Computer Music Journal in 2011. In 2016 they released their first album as double vinyl and digital download, featuring live coded improvisation.
