= Interactive programming =

Procedure of writing program parts while active

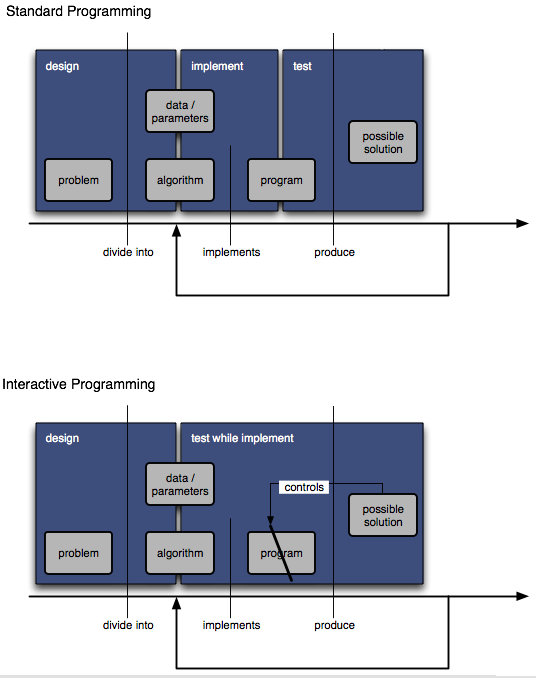
Interactive programming vs. standard programming

Interactive programming is the procedure of writing parts of a program while it is already active. This focuses on the program text as the main interface for a running process, rather than an interactive application, where the program is designed in development cycles and used thereafter (usually by a so-called "user", in distinction to the "developer"). Consequently, here, the activity of writing a program becomes part of the program itself.

It thus forms a specific instance of interactive computation as an extreme opposite to batch processing, where neither writing the program nor its use happens in an interactive way. The principle of rapid feedback in extreme programming is radicalized and becomes more explicit.

It is also known as on-the-fly-programming, just in time programming, or conversational programming.

== Application fields ==
Interactive programming techniques are especially useful in cases where no clear specification of the problem that is to be solved can be given in advance. In such situations (which are not unusual in research), the formal language provides the necessary environment for the development of an appropriate question or problem formulation.

Interactive programming has also been used in applications that need to be rewritten without stopping them, a feature which the computer language Smalltalk is famous for. Generally, dynamic programming languages provide the environment for such an interaction, so that typically prototyping and iterative and incremental development is done while other parts of the program are running.

As this feature is an apparent need in sound design and algorithmic composition, it has evolved significantly there. More recently, researchers have been using this method to develop sonification algorithms.

Using dynamic programming languages for sound and graphics, interactive programming is also used as an improvisational performance style live coding, mainly in algorithmic music and video.

== Example code ==
- Live coding of 3D graphics in ActionScript using COLT
- An example of some code in the dynamic programming language SuperCollider is available here.
- Another example, written in ChucK is available here
- Live coding of graphics with fluxus: a screenshot
- Impromptu (programming environment)
- An example of livecoding in English with Quoth
- Hot-swapping in the functional reactive programming language Elm

== See also ==
- Live coding
- Rapid application development
- Read–eval–print loop
