= Ixi software =

ixi software
- ixi software
- Developer: ixi software
- Operating system: Linux, Mac OS X, Microsoft Windows
- Type: experimental music
- Website: Official website

ixi software is an open source experimental project concerned with building musical instruments where the interface is at the same time a meta-composition. The instrument becomes a pattern generator suitable for the performance of generative music. ixi runs a label as well where music is released under the Creative Commons license.

One of the aims of ixi software is to resist the constraints of commercial music software.

A popular release is the ixiQuarks software suite which is built on top of SuperCollider, allowing for much of the expressive computational power of that environment. The user is faced with the simplicity of ixi software with seamless access to SuperCollider both within the ixiQuarks and at the side.

More recent releases are the ixi lang system for live coding, and the Threnoscope. These software packages are used for teaching computer music (particularly live coding) in higher education in diverse international institutions.
