= SQ8 =

SQ8 may refer to:

- SQ8 Snapper, a Reaktor sequencer
- Korg SQ-8, a hardware music sequencer
- Audi SQ8, performance SUV
