= IxiQuarks =

ixiQuarks
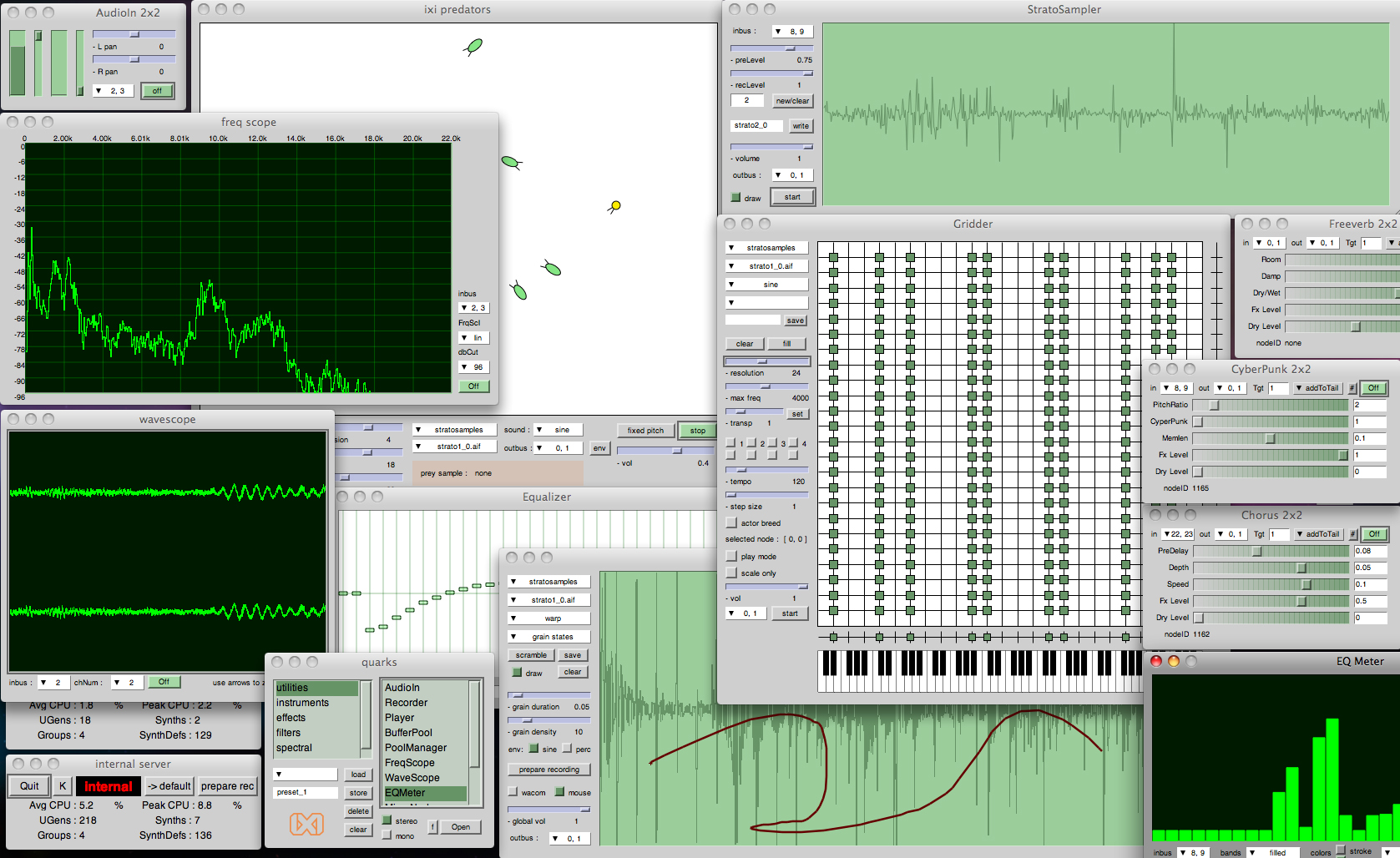
- Developer: ixi software
- Operating system: Mac OS X
- Type: experimental music, software
- Website: www.ixi-audio.net

ixiQuarks is an experimental music software released by the ixi software team, focusing on both live and studio production contexts.

ixiQuarks is a software environment designed for live musical improvisation that allows for user interaction on hardware, GUI and code level. The environment enables innumerable setups with flexible loading of tools and instruments. The ixiQuarks consist of different types of tools: basic utilities, instruments, effects, filters, spectral effects and generators.

In 2008, ixiQuarks won the first prize in the Lomus international music software contest organized by the Association Française d’Informatique Musicale.

This software is written in SuperCollider and is part of an extended research programme exploring human-computer interaction in computer music.
