= Ixi lang =

Live coding environment

ixi lang
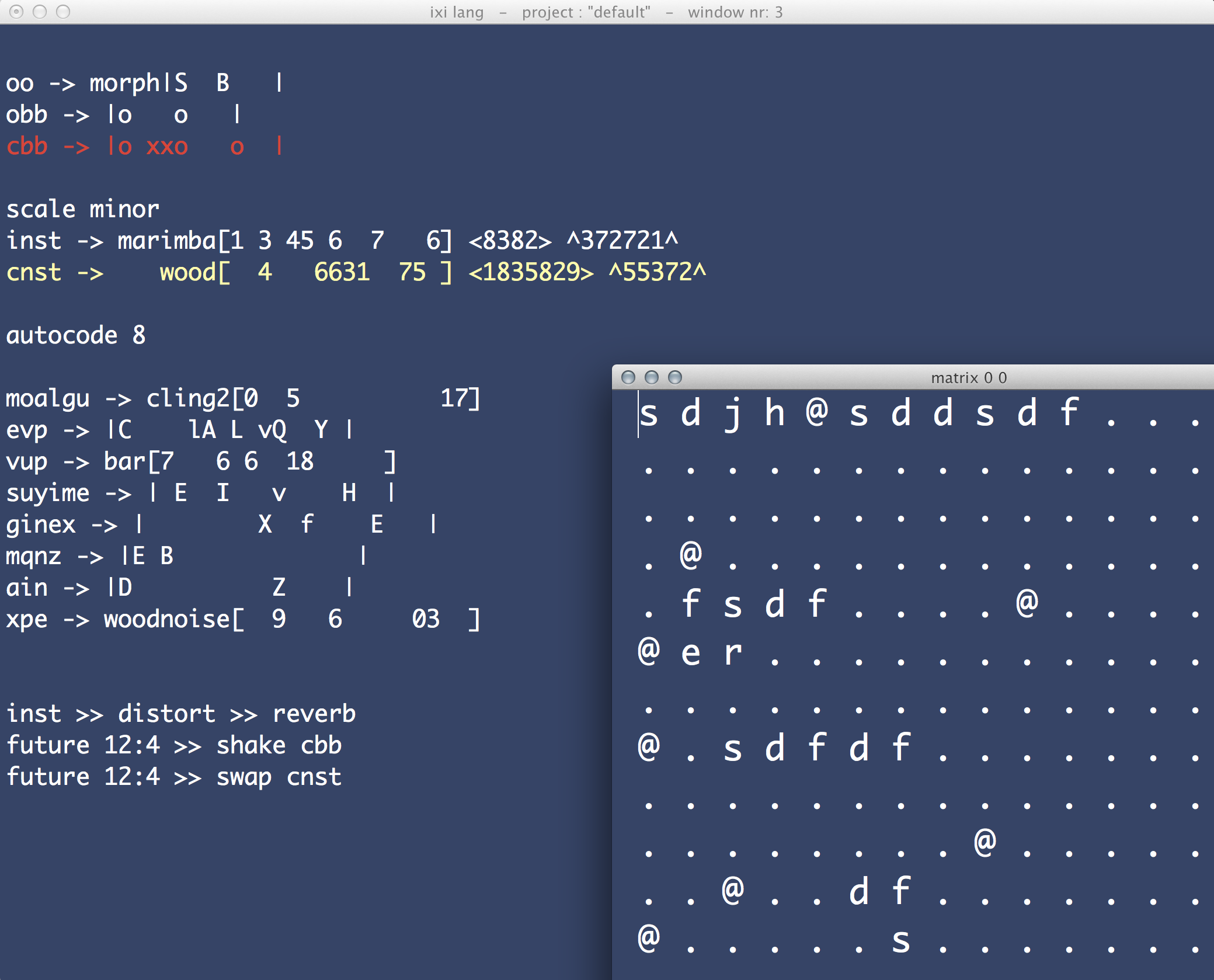
- ixi lang
- Developer(s): ixi software
- Operating system: Mac OS X
- Type: live coding, experimental music
- Website: www.ixi-software.net

Ixi lang is a programming language for live coding musical expression. It is taught at diverse levels of musical education and used in Algorave performances. Like many other live coding languages, such TidalCycles, ixi lang is a domain-specific language that embraces simplicity and constraints in design.

In 2015, ixi lang was presented at the Loop summit, organised by the music software manufacturer Ableton, where it gained critical acclaim as an alternative way of making music in the studio as well as in live performance. Mark Smith, of techno-duo Garland writes about the language: "By entering the name of a sound, drawing your own bars and typing notes with numbers, you can make simple beats and melodies almost immediately. If you memorise a few different command lines a broad range of modulations and structural changes becomes possible. Whatever simple information you entered beforehand becomes hugely pliable – and you can do all this to your own uploaded bank of samples. Given that just about anyone can get up and running with a few minutes, those who are willing to put their time into live coding software like ixi lang can reach highly intuitive and fluid levels of improvised composition".

Ixi lang is used internationally, for example by members of the Quase-Linema Lab collective in Brazil, Belisha Beacon, Section 9 and Deerful in the UK, or by the Paris-based Sougata Bhattacharya. Ixi Lang is referenced in various live coding literature and has influenced other live coding systems such as Gibber, EarSketch, WulfCode and Sonic Pi.
