= JSyn =

JSyn ("Java Synthesis") is a free API for developing interactive sound applications in Java. Developed by Phil Burk and others, it is available on GitHub. JSyn has a flexible, unit generator-based synthesis and DSP architecture that allows developers to create synthesizers, audio playback routines, and effects processing algorithms within a Java framework that allows for easy integration with other Java routines (e.g. graphics, user interface, etc.).

Although fundamentally a synthesis language (imitative of if not directly inspired by Csound and other MUSIC-N languages), JSyn has a number of powerful extensions and ancillary libraries, including JMSL (a Java update to the HMSL music specification language) and JScore (a staff notation editor and library), which adds a significantly higher level of musical informatics to the package than would normally be supplied with a set of synthesis routines. Wire, a graphical editor for JSyn routines, also allows developers to create DSP chains using a simple GUI that gives the API some of the ease of use of programs such as Max/MSP.

JSyn is licensed under the free Apache License V2.
