= Pop music automation =

Field of study among musicians and computer scientists

Pop music automation is a field of study among musicians and computer scientists with a goal of producing successful pop music algorithmically. It is often based on the premise that pop music is especially formulaic, unchanging, and easy to compose. The idea of automating pop music composition is related to many ideas in algorithmic music, artificial intelligence (AI) and computational creativity.

== History of automation in music ==
Algorithms (or, at the very least, formal sets of rules) have been used to compose music for centuries; the procedures used to plot voice-leading in counterpoint, for example, can often be reduced to algorithmic determinant. Now the term is usually reserved, however, for the use of formal procedures to make music without human intervention.

Classical music automation software exists that generates music in the style of Mozart and Bach and jazz. Most notably, David Cope has written a software system called "Experiments in Musical Intelligence" (or "EMI") that is capable of analyzing and generalizing from existing music by a human composer to generate novel musical compositions in the same style. EMI's output is convincing enough to persuade human listeners that its music is human-generated to a high level of competence.

Creativity research in jazz has focused on the process of improvisation and the cognitive demands that this places on a musical agent: reasoning about time, remembering and conceptualizing what has already been played, and planning ahead for what might be played next.

Inevitably associated with pop music automation is pop music analysis.

Projects in pop music automation may include, but are not limited to, ideas in melody creation and song development, vocal generation or improvement, automatic accompaniment and lyric composition.

== Automatic accompaniment ==
Some systems exist that automatically choose chords to accompany a vocal melody in real-time. A user with no musical experience can create a song with instrumental accompaniment just by singing into a microphone. An example is a Microsoft Research project called Songsmith, which trains a Hidden Markov model using a music database and uses that model to select chords for new melodies.

== Melody generation ==
Automatic melody generation is often done with a Markov chain, the states of the system become note or pitch values, and a probability vector for each note is constructed, completing a transition probability matrix (see below). An algorithm is constructed to produce an output note values based on the transition matrix weightings, which could be MIDI note values, frequency (Hz), or any other desirable metric.

1st-order matrix
Note	A	C#	Eb
A	0.1	0.6	0.3
C#	0.25	0.05	0.7
Eb	0.7	0.3	0

2nd-order matrix
Note	A	D	G
AA	0.18	0.6	0.22
AD	0.5	0.5	0
AG	0.15	0.75	0.1
DD	0	0	1
DA	0.25	0	0.75
DG	0.9	0.1	0
GG	0.4	0.4	0.2
GA	0.5	0.25	0.25
GD	1	0	0

A second-order Markov chain can be introduced by considering the current state and also the previous state, as indicated in the second table. Higher, nth-order chains tend to "group" particular notes together, while 'breaking off' into other patterns and sequences occasionally. These higher-order chains tend to generate results with a sense of phrasal structure, rather than the 'aimless wandering' produced by a first-order system.

== Lyric composition ==
Automated lyric creating software may take forms such as:

- Selecting words according to their rhythm

The Tra-la-Lyrics system produces song lyrics, in Portuguese, for a given melody. This not only involves matching each word syllable with a note in the melody, but also matching the word's stress with the strong beats of the melody.

- Parsing existing pop music (e.g. for content or word choice)

This involves natural language processing. Pablo Gervás has developed a noteworthy system called ASPERA that employs a case-based reasoning (CBR) approach to generating poetic formulations of a given input text via a composition of poetic fragments that are retrieved from a case-base of existing poems. Each poem fragment in the ASPERA case-base is annotated with a prose string that expresses the meaning of the fragment, and this prose string is used as the retrieval key for each fragment. Metrical rules are then used to combine these fragments into a well-formed poetic structure.

- Automatic analogy or story creation

Programs like TALE-SPIN and The MINSTREL system represent a complex elaboration of this basis approach, distinguishing a range of character-level goals in the story from a range of author-level goals for the story. Systems like Bringsjord's BRUTUS can create stories with complex interpersonal themes like betrayal. On-line metaphor generation systems like 'Sardonicus' or 'Aristotle' can suggest lexical metaphors for a given descriptive goal (e.g., to describe a supermodel as skinny, the source terms “pencil”, “whip”, “whippet”, “rope”, “stick-insect” and “snake” are suggested).

- Free association of grouped words

Using a language database (such as wordnet) one can create musings on a subject that may be weak grammatically but are still sensical. See such projects as the Flowerewolf automatic poetry generator or the Dada engine.

== Software ==
=== More or less free ===
- BreathCube by xoxos. Simple lyrical vocal content is generated with simple music.
- CubeBreath by xoxos. Audio input is vocoded in tune with the music.
- Midi Internet Algorithmic Composition
- infno, infinite generator of electronic dance music and synth-pop.
- Algorithmic Trap, trap beat generator.

=== Commercial ===
- Band in a box generates any element, potentially creates whole new songs from scratch.
- Musical Palette - Melody Composing Tool
- SongSmith: Automatic accompaniment for vocal melodies
- Ludwig 3.0 automatic accompaniment, writes arrangements for given instruments, plays its own songs for an infinitely long time.
- Automated Composing System creates music in many different styles

== See also ==
- Algorithmic music
- Artificial creativity
- Computer music
