= Fluxus (programming environment) =

Live coding environment for 3D graphics, music and games

- Developers: Dave Griffiths, Gabor Papp and others
- Release: 2005
- Preview release: 0.17rc5 / 18 April 2012; 14 years ago
- Operating system: Linux, macOS, Windows
- Type: Live coding environment
- License: GNU General Public License
- Website: www.pawfal.org/fluxus/

Fluxus is a live coding environment for 3D graphics, music and games. It uses the programming language Racket (a dialect of Scheme/Lisp) to work with a games engine with built-in 3D graphics, physics simulation and sound synthesis. All programming is done on-the-fly, where the code editor appears on top of the graphics that the code is generating. Fluxus has found use in research and practice in exploratory programming, pedagogy, live performance and games programming.
