= Larry Polansky =

American classical composer (1954–2024)

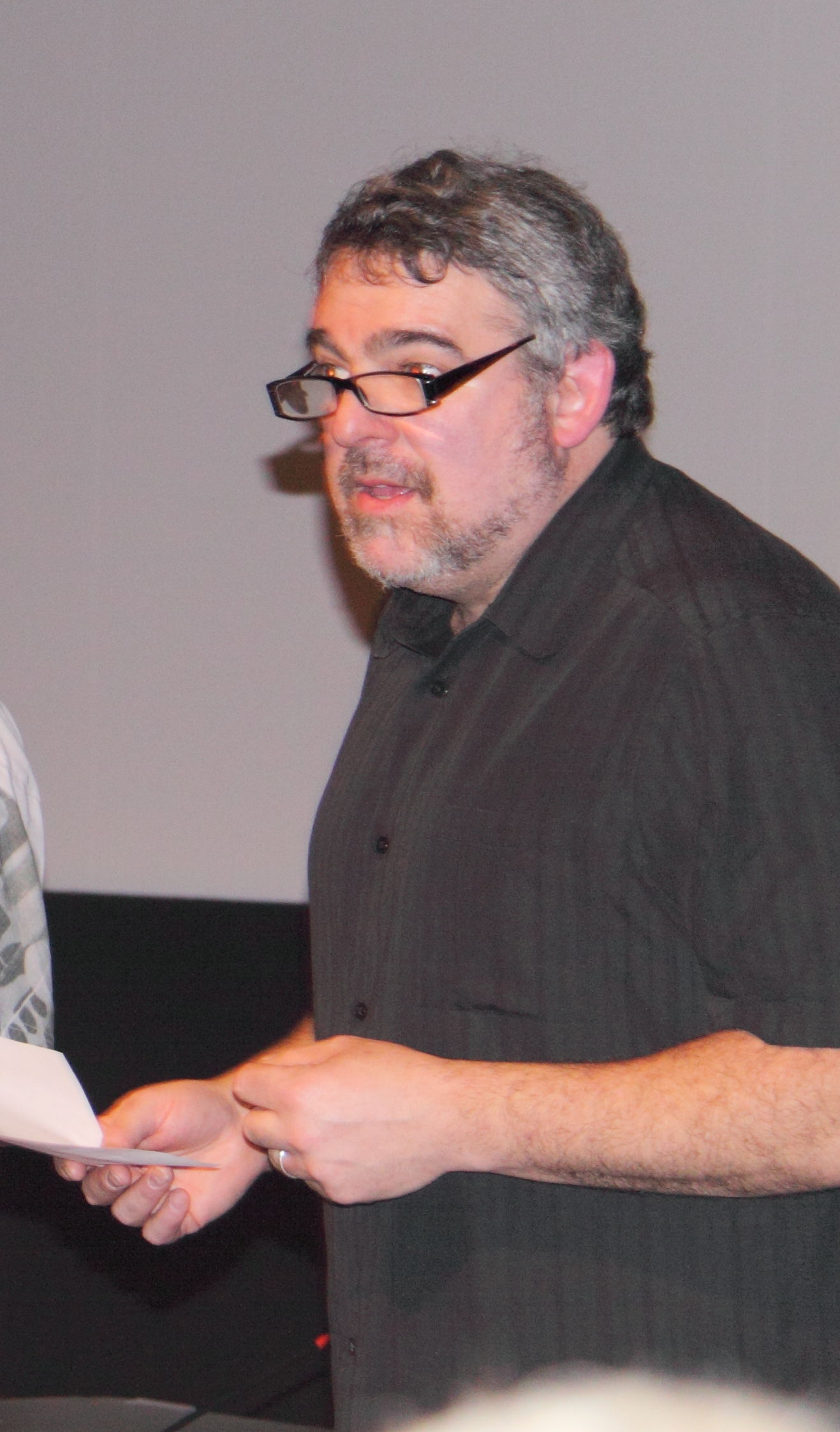
Polansky in 2009

Larry Polansky (October 16, 1954 – May 9, 2024) was an American composer, guitarist, mandolinist, and academic.

== Biography ==
Polansky was born on October 16, 1954, in New York City to first-generation Jewish-American parents. He grew up in Valley Stream, Nassau County, Long Island. He became fascinated with the guitar from an early age, which remained central to his work throughout his life. He failed his senior-year English class but was allowed to graduate from high school in 1972 due to high SAT scores.

Brother of the writer Steven Polansky, and hence uncle of entrepreneur, venture capitalist, music producer and songwriter Michael Polansky, Larry Polansky read mathematics and music at the University of California, Santa Cruz (UCSC), graduating in 1977. He served on the faculty of Dartmouth College and held the title of Emeritus Strauss Professor of Music upon his retirement from Dartmouth. He subsequently returned to UCSC and served on the UCSC music faculty from 2013 to 2019. He was a founding member and co-director of Frog Peak Music (a composers' collective). He co-wrote HMSL (Hierarchical Music Specification Language) with Phil Burk and David Rosenboom.

There are several recordings of his work, including Four-Voice Canons (an album of mensuration canons). He served as co-producer of Asmat Dream: New Music Indonesia, Vol. I.

Polansky was previously married to ethnomusicologist and performer Jody Diamond. Music historian and musician Amy C. Beal was his long time partner and frequent musical collaborator.

Polansky died on May 9, 2024, at the age of 69.

== Discography ==
- freeHorn (2017, Cold Blue Music)
- Three Pieces for Two Pianos (2016, New World Records)
- The World's Longest Melody (2010, New World Records, featuring Zwerm guitar quartet)
- The Theory of Impossible Melody (1990, Artifact Recordings; 2008 Reissue on New World Records)
- Trios (2004, Pogus CDs, with Douglas Repetto, Tom Erbe, Chris Mann, Christian Wolff)
- Four Voice Canons (2002, Cold Blue Recordings)
- Change (2002, Artifact Recordings)
- Lonesome Road (2001, New World Records, featuring Martin Christ, piano)
- Simple Harmonic Motion (1994, Artifact Recordings)
