= SynthEdit =

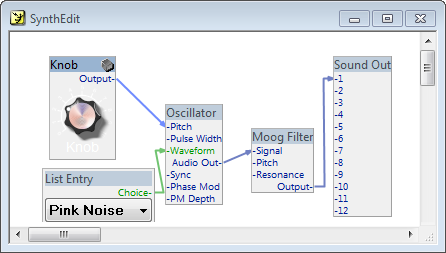
- A screenshot of version 1.1 of SynthEdit, showing its node-based editor.
- Original author: Jeff McClintock
- Release: June 23rd, 2005; 21 years ago
- Stable release: 1.4 (build 668) / October 4th, 2022; 3 years ago
- Operating system: Windows
- License: Proprietary
- Website: www.synthedit.com

SynthEdit is a modular audio plugin development environment which uses a visual editor. First conceived in 1987 by programmer Jeff McClintock and initially distributed in 1999, it was officially released in 2005.

Along with Native Instruments' Reaktor and the closely related FlowStone (previously known as SynthMaker) by DSPRobotics, SynthEdit has been recognised as one of the few tools for independent synthesizer development that don't require traditional programming like JUCE, and the only visual programming environment with 64-bit VST 3 support.

== Overview ==
SynthEdit provides a GUI editing system and a full MIDI interface for hardware controllers. It can export projects as VST plugins, allowing creations to be used as instruments and effects inside of most DAWs and on macOS, where SynthEdit was previously unavailable.

=== Interface ===
Below a toolbar containing a switch (stylised as a green power button) to start and stop the audio engine, SynthEdit's interface is divided into three vertical sections: a left panel containing a list of modules, a section for the detached visual editing windows in the middle, and a panel showing the highlighted modules' properties and values on the right. Any number of modules can be nested in an organised structure called a container, which will reveal its contents in another window upon being clicked, and any module can receive or send input of various types from other modules through colour-coded nodes.

== Features ==
=== Modules ===
The SynthEdit SDK is an accompanying tool that can be used for the development of extensions, known as external modules, using C++. These extensions interface directly with the program, appearing like stock modules within the program's visual environment.

Since its release, the SDK has allowed developers to release additional freeware and payware modules for use within SynthEdit, adding new features to the program like the ability to manipulate waveforms through Fourier transforms (typically used in digital signal processing as the basis of additive and wavetable synthesis engines), new filters and audio effects.
