= Max Mathews =

American computer music pioneer (1926–2011)

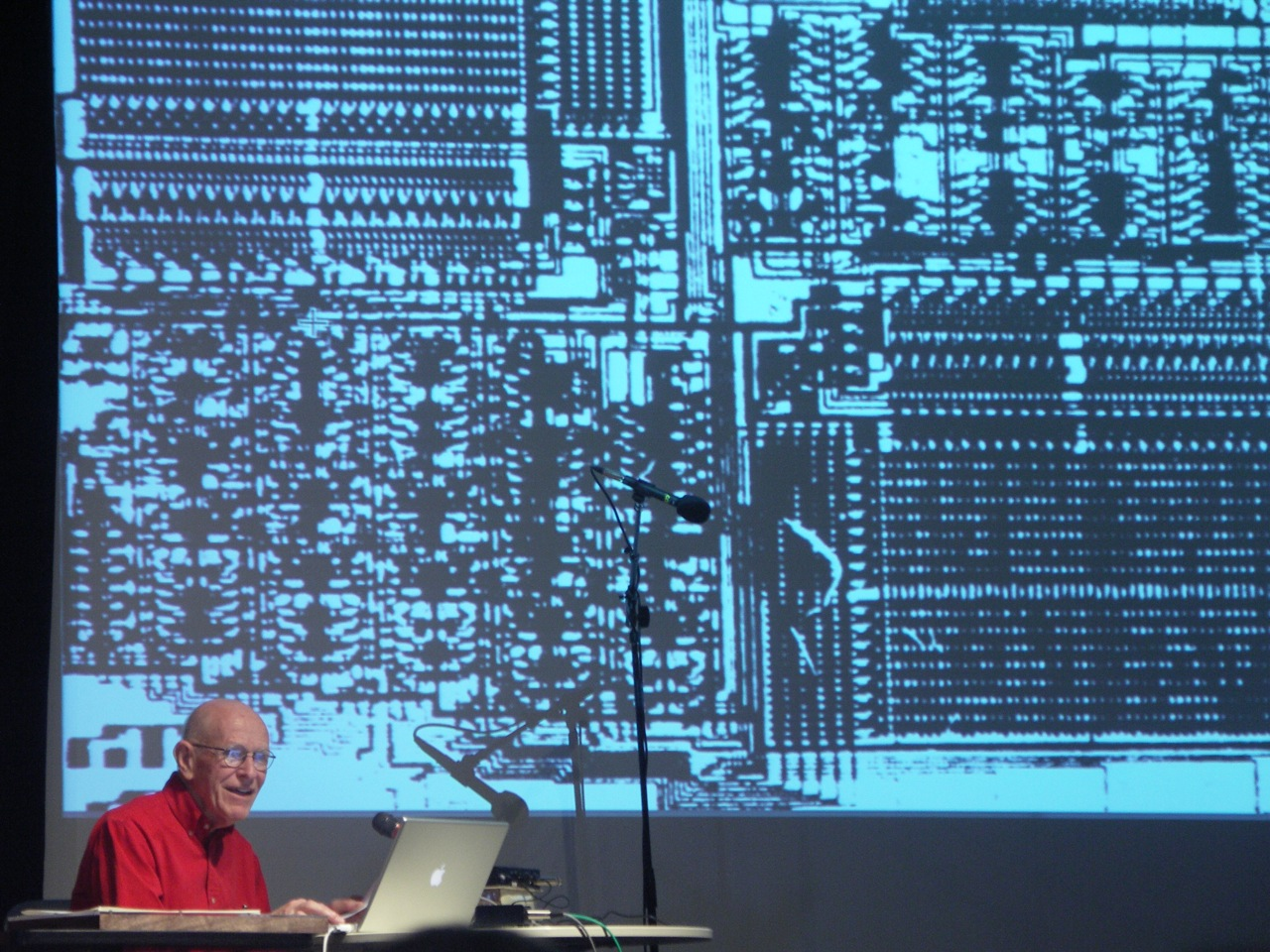
Max Mathews on his 80th birthday

Max Vernon Mathews (November 13, 1926 – April 21, 2011) was an American pioneer of computer music.

== Biography ==
Max Mathews playing an electric violin he built in his analog electronics lab at Bell Labs (c. 1970)

Max Vernon Mathews was born on November 13, 1926, in Columbus, Nebraska, to two science schoolteachers. He attended, but did not graduate from, Peru High School in Peru, Nebraska, where his parents taught and his father was also the principal. His father allowed him to play and work in the school's science laboratories from a young age.

After a period as a radar repairman in the United States Navy, where he fell in love with electronics, Mathews studied electrical engineering at the California Institute of Technology and the Massachusetts Institute of Technology, receiving a Doctor of Science in 1954. In 1957, while working at Bell Labs in New Jersey, Mathews wrote MUSIC, the first widely used computer program for music generation. For the rest of the century, he continued as a leader in digital audio research, synthesis, and human-computer interaction as it pertains to music performance.

In 1968, Mathews and L. Rosler developed Graphic 1, an interactive graphical sound system on which one could draw figures using a light pen that would be converted into sound. In 1970, Mathews and F. R. Moore developed GROOVE (Generated Real-time Output Operations on Voltage-controlled Equipment), a computer-controlled system for interactive algorithmic composition and realtime performance, using 3C/Honeywell DDP-24 (or DDP-224) minicomputers to control an analog synthesizer. GROOVE used a cathode ray tube display to simplify the management of music synthesis in realtime, 12-bit digital-to-analog conversion, an interface for analog devices, and controllers including a musical keyboard, knobs, and rotating joysticks to capture realtime performance. Composer Laurie Spiegel worked extensively with GROOVE in the mid-late 1970s.

Although MUSIC was not the first program to generate sound with a computer (the CSIRAC computer developed by CSIRO in Australia played tunes as early as 1951), Mathews' work proved most influential on subsequent generations of digital music tools. He described his work in the following excerpt from "Horizons in Computer Music", March 8–9, 1997, Indiana University:

Computer performance of music was born in 1957 when an IBM 704 in NYC played a 17 second composition on the Music I program which I wrote. The timbres and notes were not inspiring, but the technical breakthrough is still reverberating. Music I led me to Music II through V. A host of others wrote Music 10, Music 360, Music 15, Csound and Cmix. Many exciting pieces are now performed digitally. The IBM 704 and its siblings were strictly studio machines – they were far too slow to synthesize music in real-time. Chowning's FM algorithms and the advent of fast, inexpensive, digital chips made real-time possible, and equally important, made it affordable. Starting with the GROOVE program in 1970, my interests have focused on live performance and what a computer can do to aid a performer. I made a controller, the Radio-Baton, plus a program, the Conductor program, to provide new ways for interpreting and performing traditional scores. In addition to contemporary composers, these proved attractive to soloists as a way of playing orchestral accompaniments. Singers often prefer to play their own accompaniments. Recently I have added improvisational options which make it easy to write compositional algorithms. These can involve precomposed sequences, random functions, and live performance gestures. The algorithms are written in the C language. We have taught a course in this area to Stanford undergraduates for two years. To our happy surprise, the students liked learning and using C. Primarily I believe it gives them a feeling of complete power to command the computer to do anything it is capable of doing.

Radio-Baton demonstration by Mathews on SF MusicTech Summit 2010

In 1961, Mathews arranged the accompaniment of the song "Daisy Bell" for a performance by computer-synthesized human voice, using technology developed by John Kelly, Carol Lochbaum, Joan Miller, and Lou Gerstman of Bell Labs. Science fiction writer Arthur C. Clarke, who was visiting his friend and colleague John Pierce at Bell Labs' Murray Hill, New Jersey, facility at the time, was so impressed that he later told director Stanley Kubrick to use it in 2001: A Space Odyssey, in the climactic scene where the HAL 9000 computer is disabled.

Mathews directed the Acoustical and Behavioral Research Center at Bell Labs from 1962 to 1985, which carried out research in speech communication, visual communication, human memory and learning, programmed instruction, analysis of subjective opinions, physical acoustics, and industrial robotics. From 1974 to 1980 he was the Scientific Advisor to the IRCAM musical research institute in Paris, and from 1987 was Professor of Music (Research) at Stanford University. He served as the Master of Ceremonies for the inaugural conference of New Interfaces for Musical Expression (NIME) in 2001.

Mathews was a member of the National Academy of Sciences, the National Academy of Engineering and a fellow in the American Academy of Arts and Sciences, the Acoustical Society of America, the Institute of Electrical and Electronics Engineers, and the Audio Engineering Society. He received a Silver Medal from the Acoustical Society of America, and the Ordre des Arts et des Lettres from the French Ministry of Culture.

Max, a visual programming language for music originally developed by Miller Puckette at IRCAM, is named for Mathews.

Mathews died on the morning of April 21, 2011, in San Francisco, California, of complications from pneumonia, aged 84. He was survived by his wife Marjorie, three sons, and six grandchildren.

== See also ==
- Algorithmic composition
- Graphical sound
- Qwartz Electronic Music Awards
