= Pop music =

Genre of music

- Stylistic origins: Traditional pop; rock and roll
- Cultural origins: Mid-1940s, United States and England
- Typical instruments: Piano; Violin; Guitar; Synthesizer; Trumpet; Drums; flute; Vocals
- Derivative forms: New wave; hyperpop

Subgenres
- Alternative pop; art pop; bedroom pop; Brill Building; bubblegum; dance-pop; operatic pop; orchestral pop; schlager; sophisti-pop; sunshine pop; synth-pop; teen pop; wonky pop (complete list)

Fusion genres
- Ambient pop; baroque pop; country pop; contemporary R&B; cowboy pop; dancehall pop; electropop; emo pop; folk-pop; hypnagogic pop; indie pop; popiano; pop-punk; pop rap; pop-soul; pop rock; pop metal; power pop; psychedelic pop; space age pop; street pop; worldbeat; Risecore

Regional scenes
- Austria; Brazil; China; Colombia; France; Hong Kong; India; Indonesia; Iran; Italy; Japan; Kazakhstan; Malaysia; Mexico; Middle East; Morocco; Netherland; Pakistan; Philippines; Russia; Scandinavia; South America; South Korea; Sri Lanka; Sweden; Taiwan; Thailand; Turkey; Ukraine; United Kingdom; United States; Vietnam; Western Europe

Other topics
- African pop; Afro fusion; avant-pop; experimental pop; new pop; pop music automation; poptimism; rock music

Pop music, or simply pop, is a genre of popular music that originated in its modern form during the mid-1950s in the United States and the United Kingdom. During the 1950s and 1960s, pop music encompassed rock and roll and the youth-oriented styles it influenced. Rock and pop music remained roughly synonymous until the late 1960s, after which pop became associated with music that was more commercial, ephemeral, and accessible.

Identifying factors of pop music usually include repeated choruses and hooks, short to medium-length songs written in a basic format (often the verse–chorus structure), and rhythms or tempos that can be easily danced to. Much of pop music also borrows elements from other styles such as rock, hip-hop, urban, dance, Latin, and country.

The terms popular music and pop music are often used interchangeably, as the former also describes all music that is targeted for mass appeal (compare art music) and includes many disparate styles.

== Definitions and etymology ==
David Hatch and Stephen Millward describe pop music as "a body of music which is distinguishable from popular, jazz, and folk music". David Boyle, a music researcher, states pop music as any type of music that a person has been exposed to by the mass media. Most individuals think that pop music is just the singles charts and not the sum of all chart music. The music charts contain songs from a variety of sources, including classical, jazz, rock, and novelty songs. As a genre, pop music is seen to exist and develop separately. Therefore, the term "pop music" may be used to describe a distinct genre, designed to appeal to all, often characterized as "instant singles-based music aimed at teenagers" in contrast to rock music as "album-based music for adults". (Note: Musicologist Allan Moore surmises that the term "pop music" itself may have been popularized by pop art.)

Pop music evolves along with the term's definition. According to music writer Bill Lamb, popular music is defined as "the music since industrialization in the 1800s that is most in line with the tastes and interests of the urban middle class." The term "pop song" was first used in 1926, in the sense of a piece of music "having popular appeal". Hatch and Millward indicate that many events in the history of recording in the 1920s can be seen as the birth of the modern pop music industry, including in country, blues, and hillbilly music.

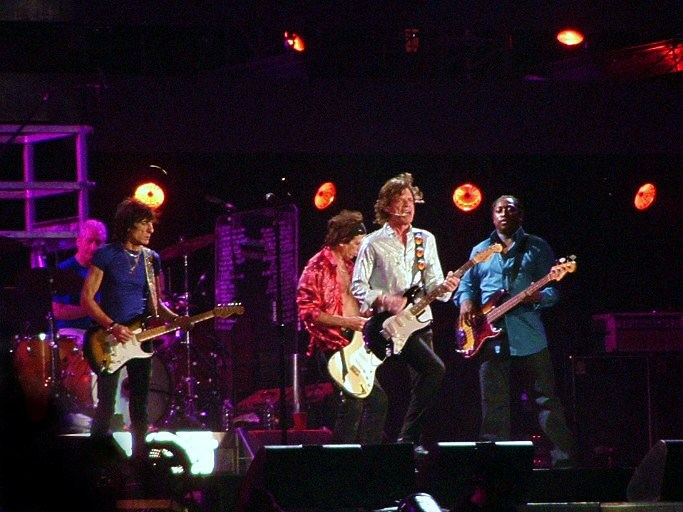
The Oxford Dictionary of Music states that the term "pop" refers to music performed by such artists as the Rolling Stones (pictured here in a 2006 performance).

According to the website of The New Grove Dictionary of Music and Musicians, the term "pop music" "originated in Britain in the mid-1950s as a description for rock and roll and the new youth music styles that it influenced". The Oxford Dictionary of Music states that while pop's "earlier meaning meant concerts appealing to a wide audience [...] since the late 1950s, however, pop has had the special meaning of non-classical mus[ic], usually in the form of songs, performed by such artists as The Beatles, The Rolling Stones, ABBA, etc." Grove Music Online also states that "in the early 1960s, [the term] 'pop music' competed terminologically with beat music [in England], while in the US its coverage overlapped (as it still does) with that of 'rock and roll'".

From about 1967, the term "pop music" was increasingly used in opposition to the term rock music, a division that gave generic significance to both terms. While rock aspired to authenticity and an expansion of the possibilities of popular music, pop was more commercial, ephemeral, and accessible. According to British musicologist Simon Frith, pop music is produced "as a matter of enterprise not art", and is "designed to appeal to everyone" but "doesn't come from any particular place or mark off any particular taste". Frith adds that it is "not driven by any significant ambition except profit and commercial reward ... and, in musical terms, it is essentially conservative". It is "provided from on high (by record companies, radio programmers, and concert promoters) rather than being made from below. ... Pop is not a do-it-yourself music but is professionally produced and packaged".

== Characteristics ==
The Righteous Brothers – "You've Lost That Lovin' Feelin'" (1965)
As of 2011, "You've Lost That Lovin' Feelin'" ranks as the most frequently played song in US radio history. It is described by music writers Nick Logan and Bob Woffinden as "the ultimate pop record".

According to Frith, characteristics of pop music include an aim of appealing to a general audience, rather than to a particular sub-culture or ideology, and an emphasis on craftsmanship rather than formal "artistic" qualities. Besides, Frith also offers three identifying characteristics of pop music: light entertainment, commercial imperatives, and personal identification. Pop music grew out of a light entertainment and easy listening tradition. Pop music is more conservative than other music genres such as folk, blues, country, and tradition. Many pop songs do not contain themes of resistance, opposition, or politics, rather focusing more on love and relationships. Therefore, pop music does not challenge its audiences socially, and does not cause political activism. Frith also said the main purpose of pop music is to create revenue. It is not a medium of free articulation of the people. Instead, pop music seeks to achieve the instant empathy with cliche personalities, stereotypes, and melodrama that appeals to listeners. Music scholar Timothy Warner said pop music typically has an emphasis on recording, production, and technology, rather than live performance; a tendency to reflect existing trends rather than progressive developments; and seeks to encourage dancing or uses dance-oriented rhythms.

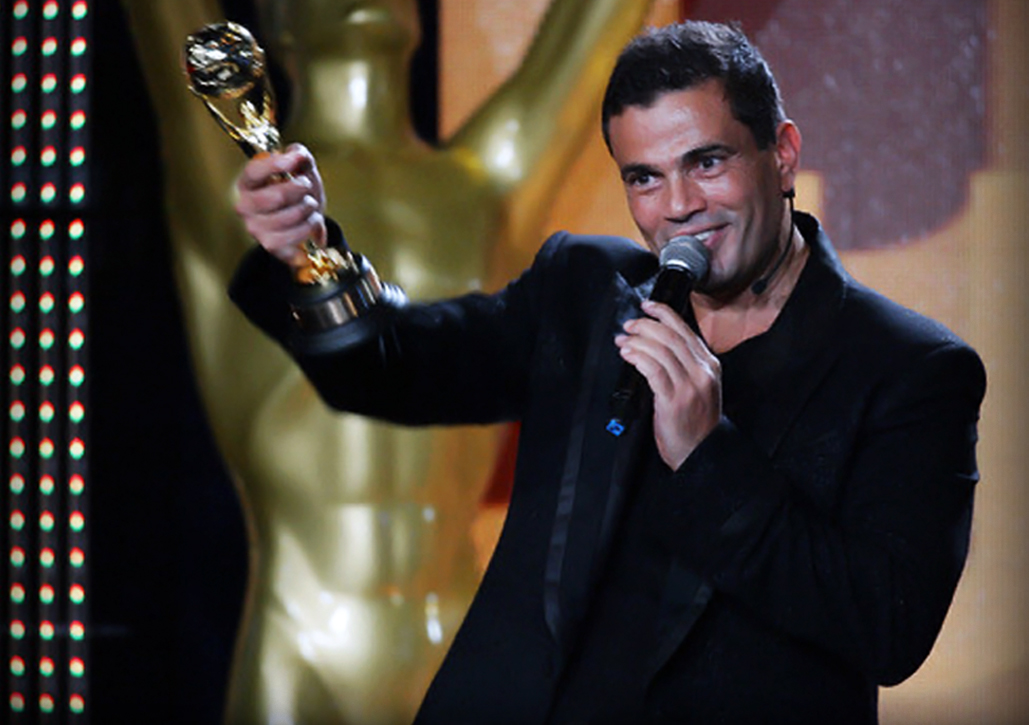
Amr Diab, Egyptian pop star, named "El-Hadaba", for achieving high records sales in the Middle East and Africa for the last three decades

The main medium of pop music is the song, often between two and a half and three and a half minutes in length, generally marked by a consistent and noticeable rhythmic element, a mainstream style and a simple traditional structure. The structure of many popular songs is that of a verse and a chorus, the chorus serving as the portion of the track that is designed to stick in the ear through simple repetition both musically and lyrically. The chorus is often where the music builds towards and is often preceded by "the drop" where the bass and drum parts "drop out". Common variants include the verse-chorus form and the thirty-two-bar form, with a focus on melodies and catchy hooks, and a chorus that contrasts melodically, rhythmically and harmonically with the verse. The beat and the melodies tend to be simple, with limited harmonic accompaniment. The lyrics of modern pop songs typically focus on simple themes – often love and romantic relationships – although there are notable exceptions.

Harmony and chord progressions in pop music are often "that of classical European tonality, only more simple-minded." Clichés include the barbershop quartet-style harmony (i.e. ii – V – I) and blues scale-influenced harmony. There was a lessening of the influence of traditional views of the circle of fifths between the mid-1950s and the late 1970s, including less predominance for the dominant function.

In October 2023, Billboard compiled a list of "the 500 best pop songs". In doing so, they noted the difficulty of defining "pop songs":

One of the reasons pop can be hard to summarize is because there's no real sonic or musical definition to it. There are common elements to a lot of the biggest pop songs, but at the end of the day, "pop" means "popular" first and foremost, and just about any song that becomes popular enough...can be considered a pop song.

== Development and influence ==
=== Technology and media ===
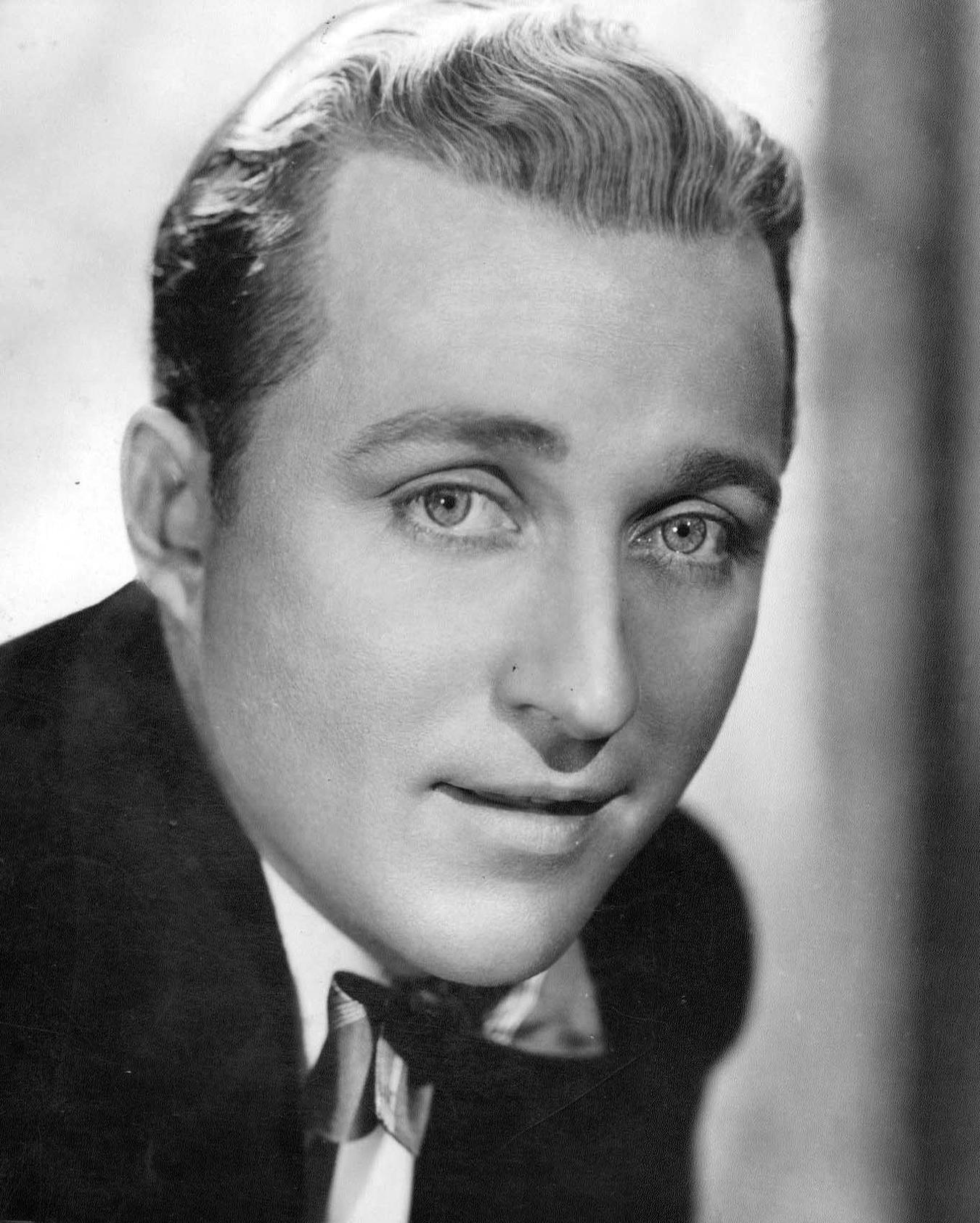
Bing Crosby was the first performer to pre-record his radio shows and master his recordings onto magnetic tape.

In the 1940s, improved microphone design allowed a more intimate singing style and, ten or twenty years later, inexpensive and more durable 45 rpm records for singles "revolutionized the manner in which pop has been disseminated", which helped to move pop music to "a record/radio/film star system". Another technological change was the widespread availability of television in the 1950s with televised performances, which meant that "pop stars had to have a visual presence". In the 1960s, the introduction of inexpensive, portable transistor radios meant that teenagers in the developed world could listen to music outside of the home. By the early 1980s, the promotion of pop music had been greatly affected by the rise of music television channels including MTV, which "favoured those artists such as Michael Jackson and Madonna who had a strong visual appeal".

Multi-track recording (from the 1960s) and digital sampling (from the 1980s) have also been used as methods for the creation and elaboration of pop music. During the mid-1960s, pop music made repeated forays into new sounds, styles, and techniques that inspired public discourse among its listeners. The word "progressive" was frequently used, and it was thought that every song and single was to be a "progression" from the last. Music critic Simon Reynolds writes that beginning with 1967, a divide would exist between "progressive" pop and "mass/chart" pop, a separation which was "also, broadly, one between boys and girls, middle-class and working-class."

The latter half of the 20th century included a large-scale trend in American culture in which the boundaries between art and pop music were increasingly blurred. Between 1950 and 1970, there was a debate of pop versus art. Since then, certain music publications have embraced the music's legitimacy, a trend referred to as "poptimism".

=== Stylistic evolution ===
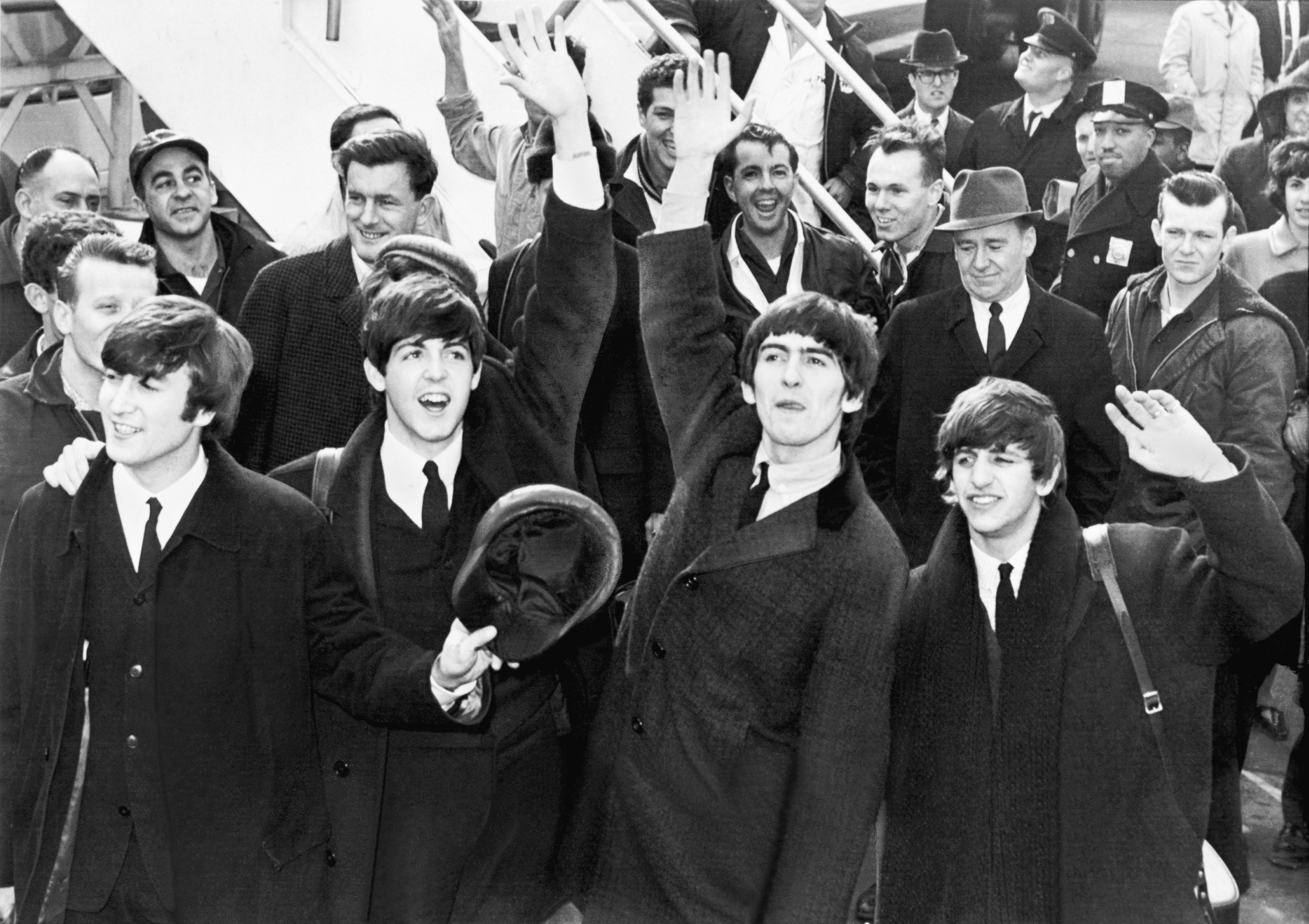
The 1960s British Invasion marked a period when the US charts were inundated with British acts such as the Beatles (pictured 1964).

Throughout its development, pop music has absorbed influences from other genres of popular music. Early pop music drew on traditional pop, an American counterpart to German Schlager and French Chanson, however compared to the pop of European countries, traditional pop originally emphasized influences ranging from Tin Pan Alley songwriting, Broadway theatre, and show tunes. As the genre evolved more influences ranging from classical, folk, rock, country, electronic music, and other popular genres became more prominent. In 2016, a Scientific Reports study that examined over 464,000 recordings of popular music recorded between 1955 and 2010 found that, compared to 1960s pop music, contemporary pop music uses a smaller variety of pitch progressions, greater average volume, less diverse instrumentation and recording techniques, and less timbral variety. Scientific American's John Matson reported that this "seems to support the popular anecdotal observation that pop music of yore was "better", or at least more varied, than today's top-40 stuff". However, he also noted that the study may not have been entirely representative of pop in each generation.

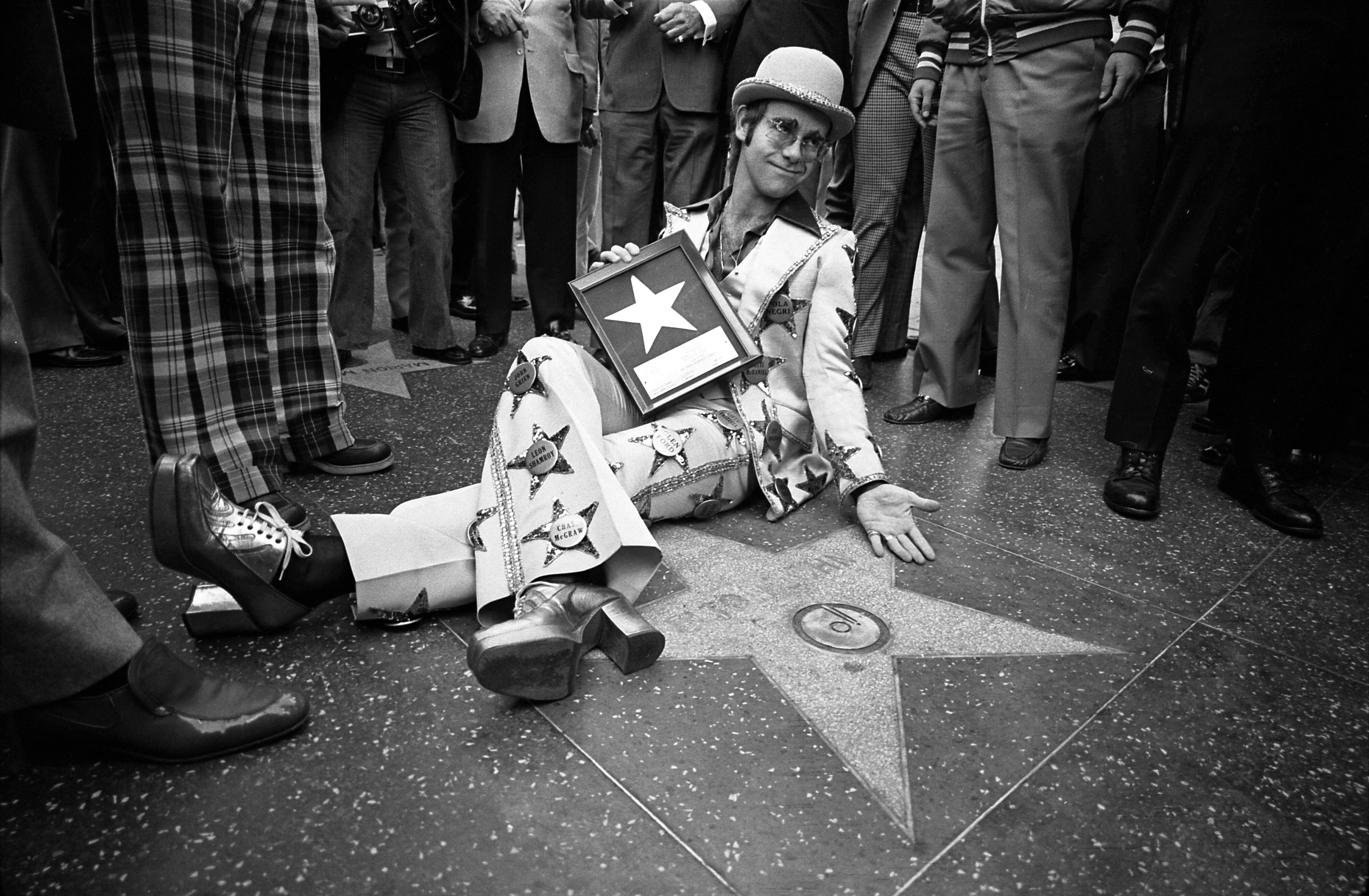
Known for his flamboyant style and virtuosic piano playing, Elton John became one of the biggest pop stars of the 1970s.

In the 1960s, the majority of mainstream pop music fell in two categories: guitar, drum and bass groups or singers backed by a traditional orchestra. Since early in the decade, it was common for pop producers, songwriters, and engineers to freely experiment with musical form, orchestration, unnatural reverb, and other sound effects. Some of the best known examples are Phil Spector's Wall of Sound and Joe Meek's use of homemade electronic sound effects for acts such as the Tornados. At the same time, pop music on radio and in both American and British film moved away from refined Tin Pan Alley to more eccentric songwriting and incorporated reverb-drenched electric guitar, symphonic strings, and horns played by groups of properly arranged and rehearsed studio musicians. A 2019 study held by New York University in which 643 participants had to rank how familiar a pop song is to them, songs from the 1960s turned out to be the most memorable, significantly more than songs from recent years 2000 to 2015.

Before the progressive pop of the late 1960s, performers were typically unable to decide on the artistic content of their music. Assisted by the mid-1960s economic boom, record labels began investing in artists, giving them the freedom to experiment, and offering them limited control over their content and marketing. This situation declined after the late 1970s and would not reemerge until the rise of Internet stars. Indie pop, which developed in the late 1970s, marked another departure from the glamour of contemporary pop music, with guitar bands formed on the then-novel premise that one could record and release their own music without having to procure a record contract from a major label.

The 1980s are commonly remembered for an increase in the use of digital recording, associated with the usage of synthesizers, with synth-pop music and other electronic genres featuring non-traditional instruments increasing in popularity. By 2014, pop music worldwide had been permeated by electronic dance music. In 2018, researchers at the University of California, Irvine, concluded that pop music has become 'sadder' since the 1980s. The elements of happiness and brightness have eventually been replaced with electronic beats making pop music more 'sad yet danceable'.

=== International spread and crosspollination ===
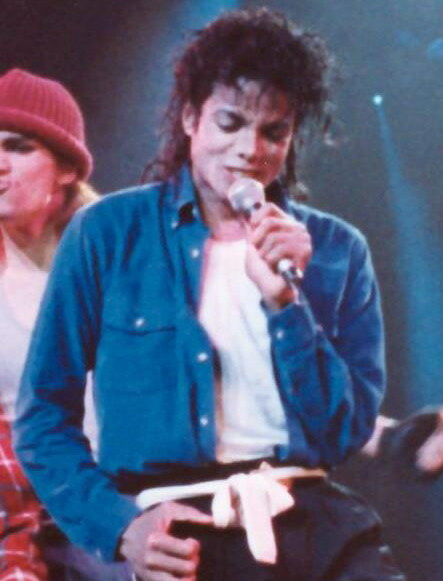
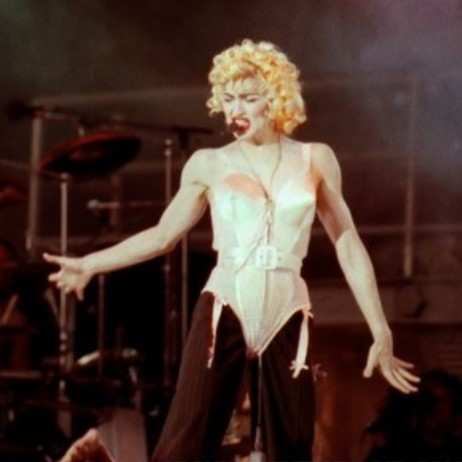
Michael Jackson (left) and Madonna (right) have been dubbed respectively as the "King and Queen of Pop" since the 1980s.

Pop music has been dominated by the American and (from the mid-1960s) British music industries, whose influence has made pop music something of an international monoculture, but most regions and countries have their own form of pop music, sometimes producing local versions of wider trends, and lending them local characteristics. Some of these trends (for example Europop) have had a significant impact on the development of the genre.

The story of pop music is largely the story of the intertwining pop culture of the United States and the United Kingdom in the postwar era.

— Bob Stanley

According to Grove Music Online, "Western-derived pop styles, whether coexisting with or marginalizing distinctively local genres, have spread throughout the world and have come to constitute stylistic common denominators in global commercial music cultures". Some non-Western countries, such as Japan, have developed a thriving pop music industry, most of which is devoted to Western-style pop. Japan has for several years produced a greater quantity of music than everywhere except the US. The spread of Western-style pop music has been interpreted variously as representing processes of Americanization, homogenization, modernization, creative appropriation, cultural imperialism, or a more general process of globalization.

One of the pop music styles that developed alongside other music styles is Latin pop, which rose in popularity in the US during the 1950s with early rock and roll success Ritchie Valens. Later, Los Lobos and Chicano rock gained in popularity during the 1970s and 1980s, and musician Selena saw large-scale popularity in the 1980s and 1990s, along with crossover appeal with fans of Tejano musicians Lydia Mendoza and Little Joe. With later Hispanic and Latino Americans seeing success within pop music charts, 1990s pop successes stayed popular in both their original genres and in broader pop music. Latin pop hit singles, such as "Macarena" by Los del Río and "Despacito" by Luis Fonsi, have seen record-breaking success on worldwide pop music charts.

Notable pop artists of the late 20th century that became global superstars include Whitney Houston, Michael Jackson, Madonna, George Michael, and Prince.

=== 21st century ===
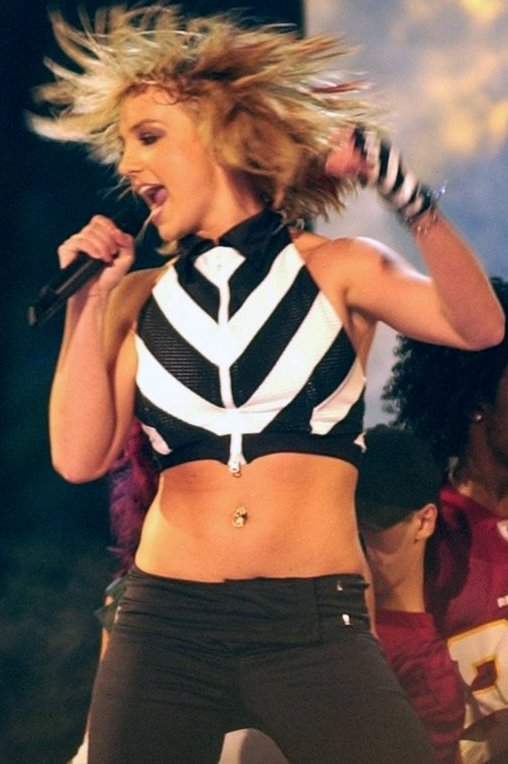
Britney Spears has been named "Princess of Pop" for revitalizing teen pop in the 2000s.

At the turn of the millennium, the Y2K pop era was partly shaped by the "Cheiron sound" developed at Sweden's Cheiron Studios, which became prominent through productions for artists including the Backstreet Boys, NSYNC and Britney Spears. At the beginning of the 2000s, the trends that dominated during the late 1990s still continued, but the music industry started to change as people began to download music from the internet. People were able to discover genres and artists that were outside of the mainstream and propel them to fame, but at the same time smaller artists had a harder time making a living because their music was being pirated. Popular artists were Avril Lavigne, Justin Timberlake, NSYNC, Christina Aguilera, Destiny's Child, and Britney Spears. Pop music often came from many different genres, with each genre in turn influencing the next one, blurring the lines between them and making them less distinct. This change was epitomized in Spears' highly influential 2007 album Blackout, which under the influence of producer Danja, mixed the sounds of EDM, avant-funk, R&B, dance music, and hip-hop.

By 2010, pop music impacted by dance music came to be dominant on the charts. Instead of radio setting the trends, it was now the club. At the beginning of the 2010s, Will.i.am stated, "The new bubble is all the collective clubs around the world. Radio is just doing its best to keep up." Songs that talked of escapism through partying became the most popular, influenced by the impulse to forget the economic troubles during the Great Recession; this style of pop music is now known as recession pop. Throughout the 2010s, a lot of pop music also began to take cues from alternative pop. Popularized by artists such as Lana Del Rey, Justin Bieber, Adele, Ariana Grande, and Lorde in the early 2010s and later inspiring other highly influential artists including Billie Eilish and Taylor Swift, it gave space to a more sad and moody tone within pop music.

In the 2020s, Canadian pop singer the Weeknd's song "Blinding Lights" became a staple hit of the decade, reaching the top spot of Billboard's greatest Hot 100 songs of all time, surpassing "The Twist" by Chubby Checker. It also broke the record for the first song to reach five billion streams on the Spotify streaming platform, becoming the most-streamed song of all time in the platform's history. This further led to a success from pop music dominating other streaming platforms such as Spotify, Apple Music and YouTube Music, with other popular artists including Taylor Swift, Drake, Ariana Grande, and Olivia Rodrigo.

== See also ==
- Honorific nicknames in popular music
- Origins of rock and roll
- Popular music pedagogy
- List of music genres and styles
  - Styles of pop music
- History of music
- Public domain music
- List of largest recorded music markets
- Music genre
- Popular art
- Pop art
