= Sonic Pi =

Live coding environment

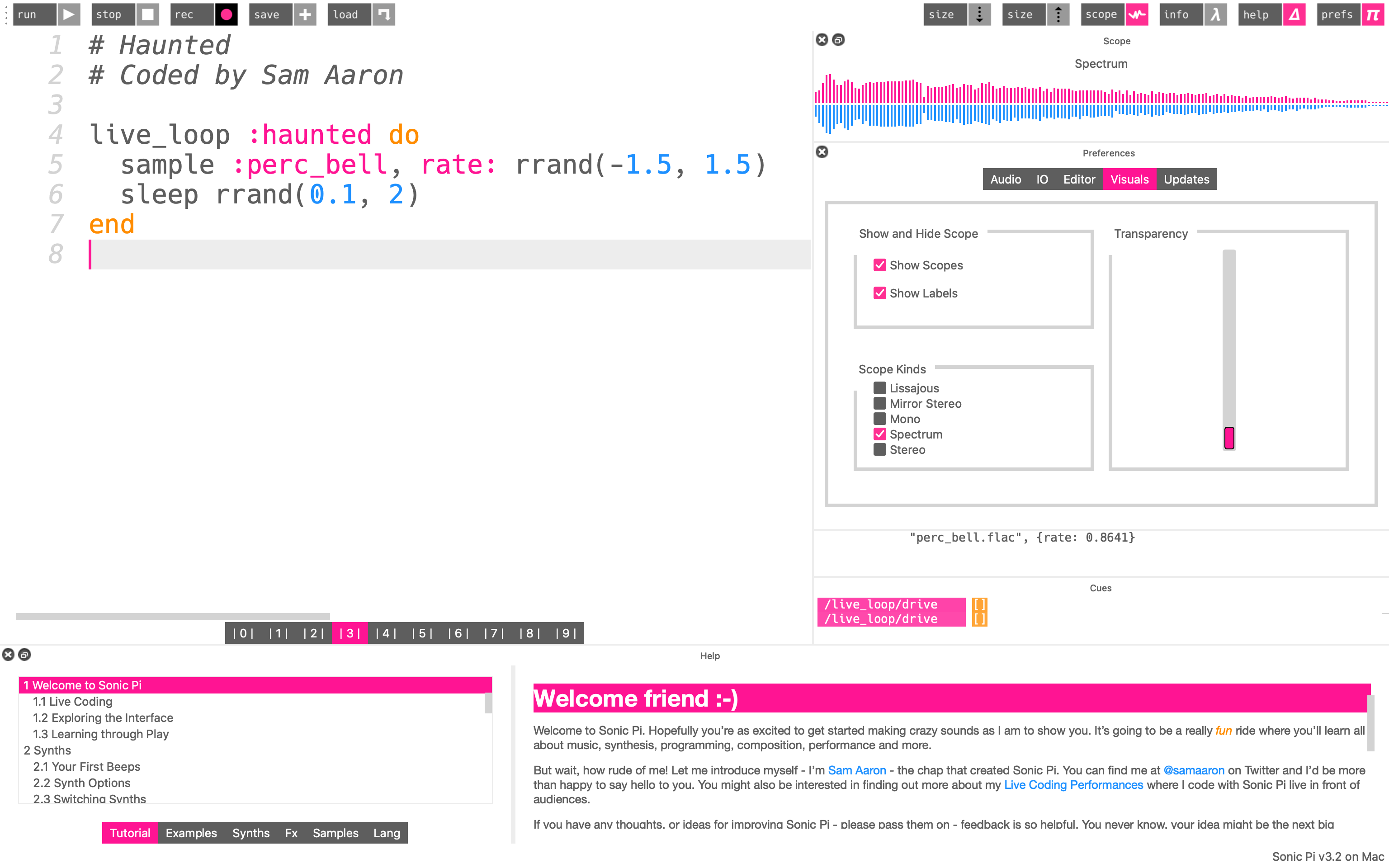
- Screenshot of Sonic Pi
- Developers: Sam Aaron and others
- Release: 2012
- Stable release: 5.0.0 / 7 August 2026; 56 days ago
- Written in: Ruby, Clojure, C++, and Qt
- Operating system: Linux, macOS, Windows, Raspberry Pi OS
- Type: Live coding environment
- License: AGPL License
- Website: sonic-pi.net
- Repository: github.com/sonic-pi-net/sonic-pi

Sonic Pi is a free open-source live coding environment based on Ruby, originally designed to support both computing and music lessons in schools, developed by Sam Aaron initially in the University of Cambridge Computer Laboratory in collaboration with Raspberry Pi Foundation, and now independently funded primarily via donations from users.

== Uses ==
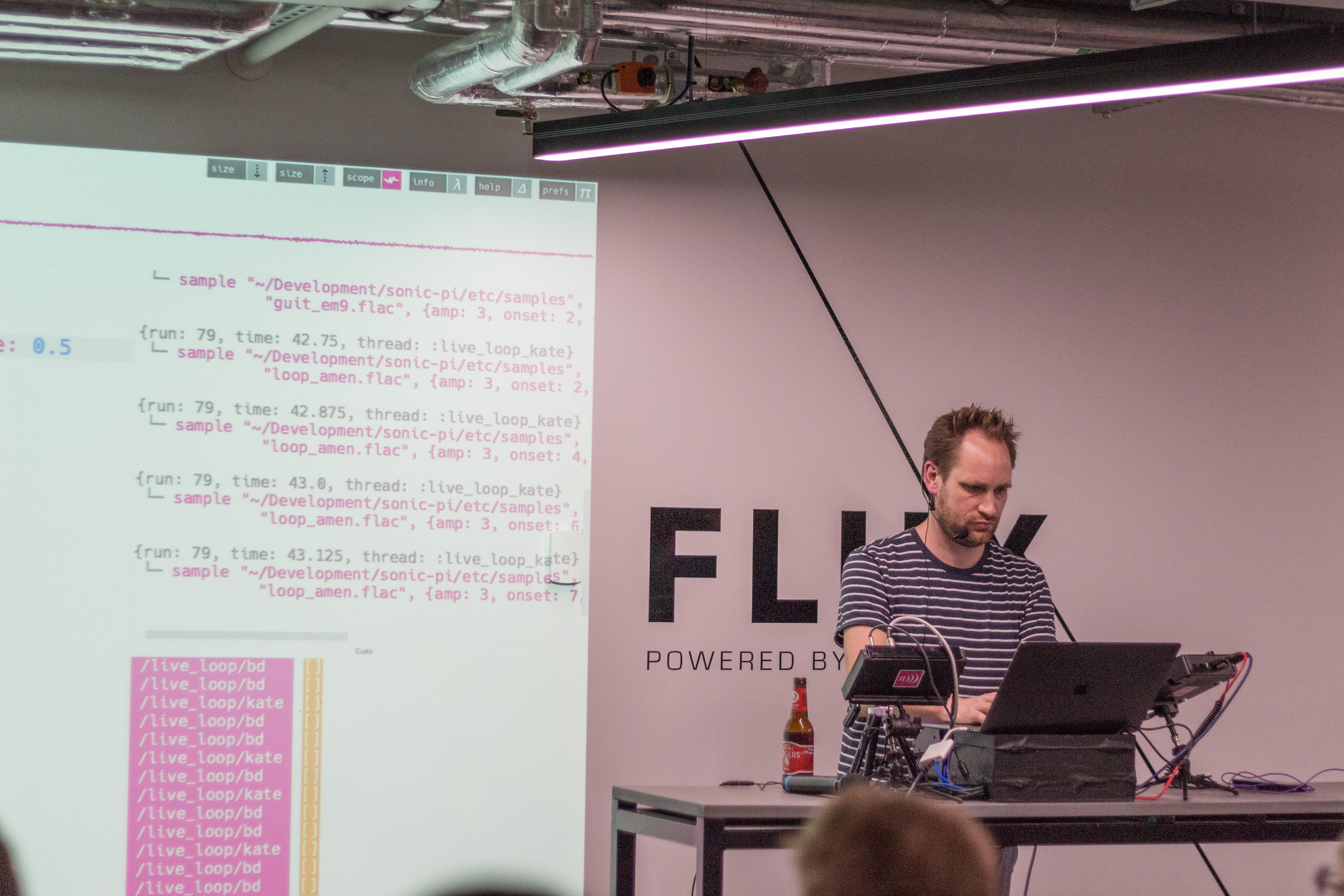
Sam Aaron, creator of Sonic Pi, demonstrating the program

Thanks to its use of the SuperCollider synthesis engine and accurate timing model, it is also used for live coding and other forms of algorithmic music performance and production, including at algoraves. Its research and development has been supported by Nesta, via the Sonic PI: Live & Coding project.

== See also ==
- Pure Data
- Algorithmic composition
- List of MIDI editors and sequencers
- List of music software
