= Live coding =

Integration of programming as part of running program

A live coding performance at Miscellania in Melbourne

Live coding, sometimes referred to as on-the-fly programming, is a performing art form and creativity technique where source code is written in an improvised way, often for creating music, imagery, and light art; sometimes combining improvised dance, poetry, and kinds of performance outside the code itself. It is particularly prevalent in computer music, combining elements of human and algorithmic composition.

While traditional programming is concerned with creating a product, live coding is centred on creating experiences for the audience and performer. Typically, the process of writing source code is made visible by projecting the computer screen in the audience space. Live coding techniques can also be employed outside of performance, such as in producing sound for film or audiovisual work for interactive art installations.

Live coding is also an increasingly popular technique in programming-related lectures and conference presentations, and has been described as a "best practice" for computer science lectures by Mark Guzdial.

== Techniques ==
A Study in Keith is a musical live coding performance in Impromptu by Andrew Sorensen.

A range of techniques have been developed and appropriated for the purposes of live coding.

=== Representation and manipulation of time ===
The specific affordances of time-based media and live interaction with code has led to a number of novel developments and uses in programming language design. Through mutual embedding of imperative and declarative subsystems, the programming language SuperCollider permitted to build a library that allows incomplete and provisional specifications which can be rewritten at runtime.

The ChucK language introduced an approach to "strongly timed" programming in 2002, embedding precision timing into control flow through a concise syntax.

"Temporal recursion" was a term initially coined in relation to the Impromptu programming environment. Technical elements within a programming environment continue to locate compressors and recursion solutions, but timing had been a major issue. While the general form of a temporal recursion, being any asynchronous function recursion through time, is available to any event driven system, Impromptu has placed a special emphasis on this particular design pattern, making it the centre piece of the concurrency architecture on that platform. Temporal recursion had repeatedly been used in SuperCollider and has since been implemented in the Fluxus environment.

Another functional approach to the representation of time is shown in the Tidal pattern DSL, which represents patterns as combinators operating over functions of time, similar to techniques in functional reactive programming.

=== Multi-user programming and shared memory ===
Multi-user programming has developed in the context of group music-making, through the long development of the Republic system developed and employed by members of the network band PowerBooks Unplugged. Republic is built into the SuperCollider language, and allows participants to collaboratively write live code that is distributed across the network of computers. There are similar efforts in other languages, such as the distributed tuple space used in the Impromptu language. Additionally Overtone, Impromptu and Extempore support multi-user sessions, in which any number of programmers can intervene across the network in a given runtime process. The practice of writing code in group can be done in the same room through a local network or from remote places accessing a common server. Terms like laptop band, laptop orchestra, collaborative live coding or collective live coding are used to frame a networked live coding practice both in a local or remote way.

== Organizations ==
TOPLAP (The (Temporary|Transnational|Terrestrial|Transdimensional) Organisation for the (Promotion|Proliferation|Permanence|Purity) of Live (Algorithm|Audio|Art|Artistic) Programming) is an informal organization formed in February 2004 to bring together the various communities that had formed around live coding environments. The TOPLAP manifesto asserts several requirements for a TOPLAP compliant performance, in particular that performers' screens should be projected and not hidden.

On-the-fly promoted live coding practice between 2020-2022. This was a project co-funded by the Creative European program and run in Hangar, ZKM, Ljudmila and Creative Code Utrecht.

== Research ==
A number of research projects and research groups have been created to explore live coding, often taking interdisciplinary approaches bridging the humanities and sciences. First efforts to both develop live coding systems and embed the emerging field in the broader theoretical context happened in the research project Artistic Interactivity in Hybrid Networks from 2005 to 2008, funded by the German Research Foundation.

Further, the Live Coding Research Network was funded by the UK Arts and Humanities Research Council for two years from February 2014, supporting a range of activities including symposia, workshops and an annual international conference called International Conference on Live Coding (ICLC).

== Examples of live coding environments ==
- ChucK
- Csound
- Extempore
- Fluxus
- Glicol
- Impromptu
- ixi lang
- Max
- Pharo
- Pure Data
- Scratch
- Sonic Pi
- SuperCollider
- TidalCycles
- Sardine
- Strudel

== See also ==
- Algorave—event where music and/or visuals are generated from algorithms, generally live coded
- Demoscene—subculture around coding audiovisual presentations (demos)
- Exploratory programming—the practice of building software as a way to understand its requirements and structure
- Interactive programming—programming practice of using live coding in software development
- NIME—academic and artistic conference on advances in music technology, sometimes featuring live coding performances and research presentations
- Creative coding—programming approach to create something expressive
