= Extempore (software) =

Audio programming language

- Paradigms: multi-paradigm: functional
- Family: Impromptu
- Designed by: Andrew Sorensen
- First appeared: 2011; 15 years ago
- Stable release: 0.10.3 / 22 July 2026; 20 days ago
- Typing discipline: Dynamic, static
- OS: Linux, macOS, Windows
- License: BSD 3-clause
- Website: github.com/digego/extempore

Influenced by
- Lisp; Scheme; Impromptu

Extempore is a live coding environment focused on real-time audiovisual software development. It is designed to accommodate the demands of cyber-physical computing. Extempore consists of two integrated languages, Scheme (with extensions) and Extempore Language. It uses the LLVM cross-language compiler to achieve performant digital signal processing and related low-level features, on-the-fly. It is free and open-source software with a BSD 3-clause license.

== Relationship to Impromptu ==
Extempore shares the use of Scheme syntax, real-time audiovisual emphasis and lead developer Andrew Sorensen with the older and related project Impromptu. It runs under Linux and macOS. The language bindings to Apple libraries are absent, but the environment can interface with dynamic libraries.
