= Reaktor =

Graphical modular software music studio

- Developer: Native Instruments
- Stable release: 6.5.0 / 2023-04-13
- Written in: C++
- Operating system: macOS, Microsoft Windows
- Type: Modular software music studio
- License: Proprietary
- Website: Reaktor 6 homepage

Reaktor is a graphical modular software music studio developed by Stephan Schmidt and Volker Hinz as founders of Native Instruments (NI). It allows musicians and sound specialists to design and build their own instruments, samplers, effects and sound design tools. It is supplied with many ready-to-use instruments and effects. In addition, free instruments can be downloaded from the User Library. All of Reaktor's instruments can be freely examined, customized, or taken apart, encouraging reverse engineering. The free, limited version called Reaktor Player allows musicians to play NI-released Reaktor instruments, but not edit or reverse-engineer them.

== Development history ==
=== Early development ===
In 1996, Native Instruments released Generator version 0.96 – a modular synthesizer for PC, requiring a proprietary audio card for low-latency operation. By 1998, Native Instruments redesigned the program to include a new hierarchy, and integrated third-party drivers for use with any standard Windows sound card. By 1999, Reaktor 2.0 (a.k.a. Generator/Transformator) was released for Windows and Macintosh. Integrated real-time display of filters and envelopes and granular synthesis are among the most notable features. With the release of software version 2.3 in 2000, plug-in support for VST, VSTi, Direct Connect, MOTU, and DirectX formats was integrated.

With version 3.0 (released in 2001), Native Instruments introduced a redesigned audio engine and new graphic design. Further expansion of synthesis and sampling modules, addition of new control-based modules (XY control) and data management (event tables) greatly expands the abilities of the program. The earliest version to really resemble the modern incarnation of the software is version 3.5, which improved greatly in VST performance and sample handling. Reaktor 3.5 is the first release that features full cross-platform compatibility.

Reaktor 4 enhanced stability, instrument library, GUI, and VSTi ease-of-use in external sequencers. It shipped almost six months behind schedule.

=== Version 5 ===
In 2003 Native Instruments hired Vadim Zavalishin, developer of the Sync Modular software package. Zavalishin ceased the development of his software, yet integrated a deeper DSP-level operation within Reaktor, known as Reaktor Core Technology. His contributions, along with those of Reaktor Core developer Martijn Zwartjes, were released within Reaktor 5 in April 2005. Core Technology initially confused a lot of instrument designers because of its complexity, but is now steadily making its way into new instruments and ensembles.

Reaktor 5.1, released on 22 December 2005, featured new Core Cell modules, and a new series of FX and ensembles. A number of bug fixes was also implemented. The release of Reaktor 5.5 was announced for 1 September 2010. It featured a revised interface as well as other changes.

=== Version 6 ===
Reaktor 6.0 was released on 9 September 2015. It featured many new improvements for advanced programmers. A new "Blocks" feature allowed for the development of rackmount style modular "patches" for creating synthesizers and effects. VST3 support was added with version 6.5.0.

== Functionality ==
From the end-user standpoint, Reaktor can behave as a sound creation/manipulation tool with a modular interface, provided there is enough CPU to manage its sample decryption processes. Its patches consist of modules, connected by lines to provide a visual interpretation of signal flow. The building blocks used give Reaktor users freedom of choice to help shape their sound design. The modules are categorized into particular hierarchy to aid clarity in patching.

The patcher window allows one to navigate the inner structure of user's models. Many factory-shipped objects within Reaktor can be accessed and edited, and new objects can be generated on the fly, expansion thereof to the users' specification coming with relative ease.

The objects that are available within Reaktor range from simple math operators to large sound modules. Implementation of Core Technology with version 5 enables user to view and edit the structure of any "Core Module" building block, although successful manipulation of Core Cells with predictable results requires in-depth knowledge of algorithmic implementation of signal generation and processing. Native Instruments promote this functionality with online side-by-side comparison of Core implementation of simple DSP algorithm against C++ pseudocode.

Provided adequate CPU is available, Reaktor enables a user to implement variables (static or dynamic) which are used as defining properties of the patch. Users have an ability to generate a GUI of their own to provide dynamic control to their systems. Starting with version 4, Reaktor supports user-generated graphical content, enabling users to customize their instruments.

Depending on the available processing power, a finished Reaktor ensemble may be loaded into a host sequencer (such as Steinberg Cubase or Ableton Live), and used in a similar manner to a stand-alone software plug-in for audio generation or processing (a multi-format proprietary loader is included with the software). Unlike truly stand alone devices, like VST plug-ins, Reaktor ensembles must be loaded in host sequencers using the Reaktor platform, which requires about 10 times the CPU processing power of more sophisticated VST. [citation needed] Each panel control in the ensemble is capable of MIDI automation in the host sequencer.

== Reaktor Ensembles ==
The Reaktor Library is one of the prominent features of the software, featuring a large variety of sound generators and effects that can be used as stand-alone instruments, or as an educational resource for reverse engineering. Reaktor 4 featured a library of 31 Reaktor ensembles. The fifth generation of software came with 32 new modules (though some were upgrades of Reaktor 4 Library tools). The libraries provide a mixture of conventional implementation of software synthesizers, samplers, and effects, along with a few ensembles of experimental nature, with emphasis on parametric algorithmic composition and extensive sound processing. Due to complete backwards-compatibility between later versions of the software, Reaktor 5 users have access to all 63 proprietary ensembles in Reaktor Library.

Furthermore, home-brew Reaktor ensembles can be shared by its users. Such exchange is encouraged by Native Instruments, providing web-based tools and webspace for individual and third-party Reaktor extensions (this includes user Ensembles and presets for Reaktor Instruments and Effects).

== See also ==
- Comparison of audio synthesis environments
- List of music software
