= List of compositions by Nikolai Obukhov =

Many of Nikolai Obukhov's works are not formally published. Obukhov's published works use International Music Score Library Project's IO categorical system, although Obukhov himself did not assign any formal opus number to his works during his life. Several of his works were published by Auguste Durand.

== By type ==
=== Vocal ===
- The Shepherd Blesses the World (for soprano, piano, and croix sonore)
- 1921: Four Balmont Songs (for soprano)
- 1937: World anthem (for voice, two pianos, and croix sonore)

=== Piano ===
- Absolute (two pianos and croix sonore)
- The living source. It is peace
- 1914-1915: Prelude No. 1
- 1914-1915: 7 Preludes for Piano
- 1915: Six Prayers
- 1915: Ten Psychological Paintings
- 1915: Icons (cycle)
- 1915: Les Astrales Parlent
- 1915: Reflet sinistre
- 1915: Eternal (cycle)
- 1915: Conversion (four pieces)
- 1916: Revelation (six pieces)
- 1933: Prosphora
- 1943: Aimons-Nous les uns les Autres (dedicated to Madame Jules Fagard)
- 1948: La paix pour les réconciliés
- 1953: Le temple est mesuré, l'esprit est incarné

=== Orchestral ===
- 1926: Prologue to the Book of Life
- 1946: The Third and Last Testament (for five voices, organ, two pianos, croix sonore, and orchestra)

=== Writings ===
- 1933: 'Emotions in Music' (Эмоции в музыке)
- 1947: 'Traité d'harmonie tonale, atonale et totale'

== See also ==
- Nikolai Obukhov
