= Computer Music Journal =

American peer-reviewed academic journal

- Discipline: Computer music, Electroacoustic music
- Language: English
- Edited by: Douglas Keislar

Publication details
- History: 1977-present
- Publisher: MIT Press (United States)
- Frequency: Quarterly
- Impact factor: 0.405 (2016)

Standard abbreviations
- ISO 4: Comput. Music J.

Indexing
- ISSN: 0148-9267 (print); 1531-5169 (web)
- JSTOR: 01489267
- OCLC no.: 41963634

Links
- Journal homepage; Online access

Computer Music Journal is a peer-reviewed academic journal that covers a wide range of topics related to digital audio signal processing and electroacoustic music. It is published on-line and in hard copy by MIT Press. The journal is accompanied by an annual CD/DVD that collects audio and video work by various electronic artists. Computer Music Journal was established in 1977. According to the Journal Citation Reports, the journal has a 2016 impact factor of 0.405.

== See also ==
- The CAMEO Dictionary of Creative Audio Terms
