= Timeline of electronic music genres =

A timeline of electronic music genres, with a date of origin, the locale of origin, and music samples.

Genre	Date of origin	Locale of origin
Electroacoustic music	Early 1940s	Egypt (Cairo)
Musique concrète	1940s	Egypt (Cairo), France (Paris)
Acousmatic music	Late 1940s	France (Paris)
Drone	1960s	United States
Dub	Late 1960s	Jamaica (Kingston)
Ambient	Late 1960s – early 1970s	Germany, Jamaica, Japan, United Kingdom
Electronic rock	Late 1960s – early 1970s	Europe, Japan, United States
Krautrock	Late 1960s – early 1970s	West Germany
Space music	Early 1970s	Germany, Japan
Bhangra	Early 1970s	India, Pakistan
Disco	Early 1970s	United States (East Coast)
Hip hop	Early 1970s	United States (New York)
Industrial	1975 (3 September)	United Kingdom (England), United States, Germany
Electronic dance music	Mid-to-late 1970s	United States
Eurodisco	Mid-to-late 1970s	Europe
New wave	Mid-to-late 1970s	United Kingdom, United States
Space disco	Mid-to-late 1970s	Europe
Synthpop	1977–1980	Germany, Japan, United Kingdom
Dancehall	Late 1970s	Jamaica (Kingston)
Japanoise	Late 1970s	Japan
Industrial rock	Late 1970s	United States
Hi-NRG	Late 1970s	United States
Post-disco	1977	United States (New York City)
Chiptune	Late 1970s – early 1980s	Japan
Dance-pop	Late 1970s – early 1980s	United States, United Kingdom
Italo disco	Late 1970s – early 1980s	Italy, Spain
Electro	Early 1980s	Japan (Tokyo), United States (New York & Detroit)
Electronic body music (EBM)	Early 1980s	Germany, Belgium
House	1983	United States (Chicago)
Garage house	1983	United States (New York & New Jersey)
Chicago house	1983	United States (Chicago)
Deep house	1985	United States (Chicago)
Acid house	Mid-1980s	United States (Chicago)
Techno	Mid-1980s	United States (Detroit), Germany
Detroit techno	Mid-1980s	United States (Detroit)
Downtempo	Mid-to-late 1980s	United Kingdom
Eurobeat	Mid-to-late 1980s	Italy, Japan, United Kingdom
Hip house	Mid-to-late 1980s	United States (Chicago, New York City, & Detroit)
Latin house	Mid-to-late 1980s	United States (New York City & Chicago)
New beat	Mid-to-late 1980s	Belgium
Acid techno	Late 1980s	United Kingdom, United States
Balearic beat	Late 1980s	Spain (Ibiza)
Breakbeat	Late 1980s	United Kingdom, United States
Eurodance	Late 1980s	Belgium, Germany, Netherlands
Florida breaks	Late 1980s	United States
Funky house	Late 1980s	United States
Ghetto house	Late 1980s	United States (Chicago)
Italo house	Late 1980s	Italy
Kwaito	Late 1980s	South Africa (Johannesburg)
Tech house	Late 1980s	United States, Spain (Ibiza)
Tribal house	Late 1980s	United States
Trip hop	1988	United Kingdom (Bristol)
Ambient house	1989	United Kingdom, Japan
Ambient techno	Late 1980s – early 1990s	United Kingdom, United States
Breakbeat hardcore	Late 1980s – early 1990s	United Kingdom (London, Stafford, Manchester, Coventry)
Hardcore	Late 1980s – early 1990s	Netherlands
Trance	Late 1980s – early 1990s	Germany, Belgium, Netherlands
Dark electro	1990	Europe
Industrial techno	1990	United Kingdom, United States, Japan
Progressive house	1990	Europe
Acid trance	1991	Europe
Ambient dub	1991	United Kingdom (London)
Baltimore club	1991	United States (Baltimore)
Glitch	1991	Germany, Japan
Goa trance	1991	India (Goa)
Intelligent dance music (IDM)	1991	Japan, United Kingdom
Psychedelic trance	1991	India (Goa)
Psydub	1991	United Kingdom (London)
UK hard house	1991	United Kingdom
Balearic trance	1992	Spain (Ibiza)
Big beat	1992	United Kingdom (London)
Dream trance	1992	Italy
Electronica	1992	United Kingdom
Gabber	1992	Netherlands (Rotterdam)
Jungle	1992	United Kingdom (London & Bristol), Jamaica
Hard trance	1992	Germany
Illbient	1992	United States (New York City)
Progressive breaks	1992	United States
Progressive trance	1992	Europe
Ragga jungle	1992	United Kingdom (London)
Tech trance	1992	Europe
Bitpop	1993	Europe, Japan, United States
Bouncy techno	1993	United Kingdom, Netherlands, Germany
Dub techno	1993	United Kingdom, Germany
Drum and bass	1993	United Kingdom (London & Bristol)
Free tekno	1993	Europe
Minimal techno	1993	United States (Detroit), Germany (Berlin)
Indietronica	1994	United Kingdom
Speed garage	1994	United Kingdom (London)
UK garage	1994	United Kingdom (London)
French house	1995	France
Ghettotech	1995	United States (Detroit & Chicago)
Breakcore	Mid-1990s	United Kingdom, Germany, Netherlands
Jump-up	Mid-1990s	United Kingdom (London)
Hardstep	Mid-1990s	United Kingdom
Nu-disco	Mid-1990s	United Kingdom
Suomisaundi	Mid-1990s	Finland
Techstep	Mid-1990s	United Kingdom
Vocal trance	Mid-1990s	Europe
Darkstep	Mid-to-late 1990s	United Kingdom
Drill 'n' bass	Mid-to-late 1990s	United Kingdom
Futurepop	Mid-to-late 1990s	Europe
Hardtechno	Mid-to-late 1990s	Europe
Microhouse	Mid-to-late 1990s	Europe
Nitzhonot	Mid-to-late 1990s	Israel
Asian underground	1997	United Kingdom
Broken beat	1997	United Kingdom (London)
2-step garage	Late 1990s	United Kingdom (London)
Electroclash	Late 1990s	United States (New York City & Detroit), Germany, Netherlands
Jersey club	Late 1990s	United States (New Jersey)
Juke	Late 1990s	United States (Chicago)
Uplifting trance	Late 1990s	Germany
Dubstep	1998	United Kingdom (London)
Liquid funk	1999	United Kingdom
Bass music (EDM)	Late 1990s – early 2000s	United Kingdom
Bassline	Late 1990s – early 2000s	United Kingdom (Sheffield & Leeds)
Breakstep	Late 1990s – early 2000s	United Kingdom (London)
Dark psy	Late 1990s – early 2000s	Europe, Russia
Electro house	Late 1990s – early 2000s	United States
Footwork	Late 1990s – early 2000s	United States (Chicago)
Full-on	Late 1990s – early 2000s	Europe
Hardstyle	Late 1990s – early 2000s	Netherlands
Progressive psytrance	Late 1990s – early 2000s	Europe
Jumpstyle	2000	Belgium, Netherlands
Grime	2000	United Kingdom (London)
Hands up	2000	Germany
Electronicore	Early 2000s	Japan, United States
Hardbass	Early 2000s	Russia
Nortec	Early 2000s	Mexico (Tijuana)
Tecno brega	Early 2000s	Brazil (Belém)
Funktronica	Early-to-mid 2000s	United States
Fidget house	2005	Europe
Future garage	2005	United Kingdom (London)
Synthwave	2006	France
UK funky	2006	United Kingdom (London)
Wonky	2006	United Kingdom
Balearica	2007	Europe
Brostep	2007	United States
Chillwave	2007	United States
Dutch house	2007	Netherlands
UK bass	2007	United Kingdom
Witch house	2007	United States, Japan
Big room house	2008	Europe
Complextro	2008	United States
Drumstep	2008	United Kingdom
Dubstyle	2009	Netherlands
Future bass	2009	United Kingdom, United States
Moombahton	2009	United States
Post-dubstep	2009	United Kingdom
Melbourne Bounce	Early 2010s	Australia (Melbourne)
Outsider house	2010	United States
Trap (EDM)	2010	United States
Moombahcore	2011	United States
Future funk	2012	Worldwide
Jungle terror	2012	Netherlands, Netherlands
Tropical house	2012	Europe
Future house	2013	Europe
Gqom	2013	South Africa (Durban)
Hardvapour	2015	Worldwide
Amapiano	2016	South Africa
Hyperpop	2016	United Kingdom, United States
Slap house	Late 2010s – early 2020s	Europe
Future rave	Early 2020s	France, Denmark

== See also ==
- List of electronic music genres
- Electronic music
- Electronic dance music
- Styles of house music
- List of trance genres
