= Brian Dennis =

English experimental music composer and author (1941–1998)

Brian Dennis was an English experimental music composer, and author born in Marple, Cheshire in May 1941 and died in June 1998.

Brian studied with Stockhausen, Berio, Earle Brown and Cathy Berberian at The Cologne Course for New Music and was a lecturer in Composition and Contemporary Music at Royal Holloway College, University of London.

Brian wrote two books in the 1970s: Experimental Music in Schools (ISBN 978-0193231955) and Projects in Sound (ISBN 978-0900938450), which propose a new graphical form of Musical notation, showing instruments as images representing their sound, rather than traditional notation on a stave. For example, the notation of a scraping wood Güiro would be shown as zig-zag lines. Both books have been used extensively in classrooms and became part of the National Curriculum of England, Wales and Northern Ireland

He also featured in BBC documentary Music in Schools and has inspired Dan Mayfield's School of Noise.

His compositions include approximately 150 songs many of which are settings of Chinese poems with lyrics in English prepared by the composer, as well as a number of piano pieces. He completed a trilogy of one-act operas based on Japanese Noh plays as well as an unfinished three-act opera based on The Snow Queen by Hans Christian Andersen.
