= The CAMEO Dictionary of Creative Audio Terms =

Dictionary of audio terminology

- Genre: Music Theory
- Publication date: 1980

The CAMEO Dictionary of Creative Audio Terms is a dictionary of audio terminology, first published in 1980 by the Massachusetts-based Creative Audio and Music Electronics Organization (CAMEO).

== Overview ==
The CAMEO Dictionary of Creative Audio Terms contains the definitions for over 1000 terms used in the recording, amplification and electronic production of music. It is aimed at a non-technical audience and includes illustrations.

== Reception ==
Two years after its publication, the publishers reported sales of 18,000 copies. By this point, the book had been added to the reading lists for courses at over 50 universities and recording schools.
