= Croix Sonore =

Analogic electronic music instrument

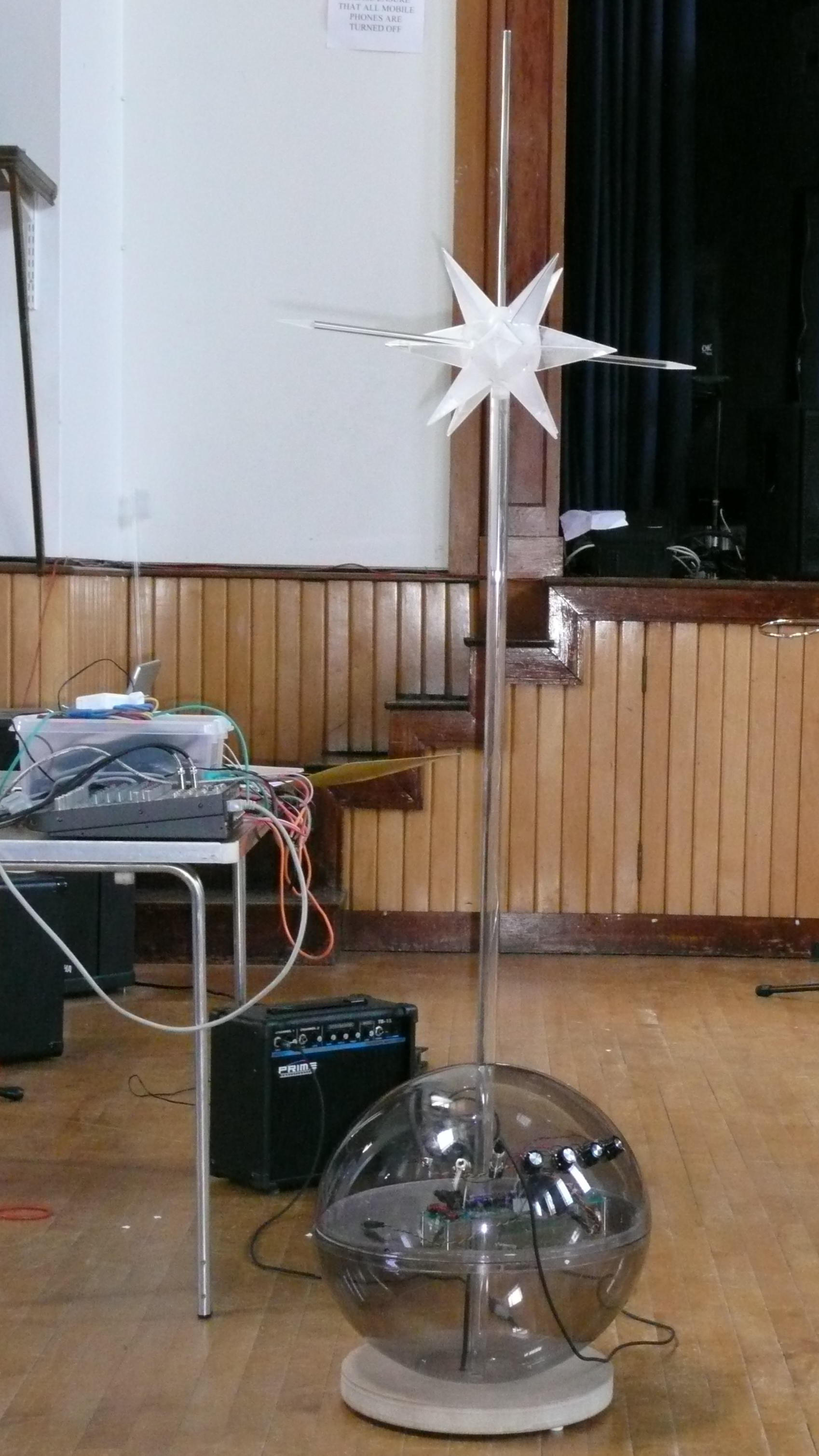
A modern replica of the Croix Sonore (2007)

The Croix Sonore is an early electronic musical instrument with continuous pitch, similar to the theremin. Like the theremin, the pitch of the tone is dependent on the nearness of the player's arm to an antenna; unlike the theremin, the antenna was in the shape of a cross, and the electronics were inside a brass ball to which the cross was affixed.

It was developed by Russian born composer Nikolai Obukhov who lived and worked in France from 1918, and built by Michel Billaudot and Pierre Dauvillier in Paris; they developed a prototype version in 1926 and demonstrated an improved version in 1934. Along with many, including Maurice Martenot, Obhukov was present at a demonstration of the thereminvox by its inventor Lev Termen (Leon Theremin) in 1924. Obukhov composed several pieces for the Croix Sonore, in duet with piano, in ensemble and as solo instrument with orchestras. The Croix Sonore was played by Marie-Antoinette Aussenac-Broglie, who was a student of Obukhov's.

== See also ==
- List of Russian inventions
