= Paul Buchanan =

Scottish songwriter and musician (born 1956)

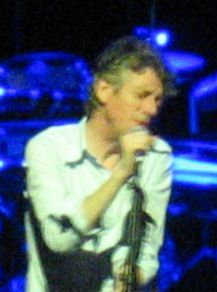
- Buchanan performing live in 2006

Background information
- Born: Paul Gerard Buchanan; 16 April 1956 (age 69); Edinburgh, Scotland
- Genres: Sophisti-pop; synth-pop; art rock
- Occupations: Singer–songwriter, musician, record producer
- Instruments: Vocals, guitar
- Years active: 1981–present
- Labels: RSO, Linn, Virgin, Warner Bros., Sanctuary
- Member of: The Blue Nile (Note: Informal indefinite hiatus since 2004)
- Website: www.paulbuchanan.com

Paul Gerard Buchanan (born 16 April 1956), is a Scottish singer-songwriter and musician, known for critically acclaimed compositions both as a co-founder of the Blue Nile and as a solo performer.

== Early life and education ==
Paul Gerard Buchanan was born on 16 April 1956 in Edinburgh. He was the first born of four children to civil servant John "Jack" Buchanan and Jesse Maria Buchanan (née Murray). His father worked at the Department of Trade and Industry. After his birth, the family moved to the Glasgow suburb town of Bishopbriggs.

Buchanan attended St. Matthews Primary School, then St Ninian's High School, Kirkintilloch, before studying literature and medieval history at the University of Glasgow, leaving with a post-graduate qualification.

== Career ==
=== Early career ===
After university, Buchanan worked as teacher, as the manager of a theatre, and for the Scottish Society of Playwrights Magazine. A guitarist, he started the Blue Nile band with friends from university: keyboardist Paul Joseph "PJ" Moore and synthesiser player and bassist Robert Bell. The band progressed from covers to releasing their own work. Their first album was produced in 1981 through RSO records.

=== The Blue Nile (1981–2005) ===
The group's early music was built heavily on synthesizers and electronic instrumentation and percussion, although later works featured guitar more prominently. Following early championing by established artists such as Rickie Lee Jones and Peter Gabriel (the band later worked with both acts), the Blue Nile gained critical acclaim, particularly for its first two albums A Walk Across the Rooftops and Hats, and some commercial success in both the UK and the US, which led to the band working with a wide range of musicians from the late 1980s onwards. The Blue Nile's highest chart placement came when "Tinseltown in the Rain" reached No. 28 in the Netherlands in 1984, their only Dutch charting song. The band has had four top 75 hits on the UK Singles Chart, the highest being "Saturday Night" which reached No. 50 in 1991. In the United States, "The Downtown Lights" was its only chart entry, peaking at No. 10 on Billboard's Alternative Songs chart.

The group appears to have disbanded since the release of the fourth album High in 2004, although there has never been any official confirmation. In 2018, the Blue Nile's album Hats, written by Buchanan, was identified by The Herald as Scotland's favourite album of all time.

=== Solo career (2006–present) ===
In 2006, Buchanan had a top 10 hit in the UK when he featured on Texas' song "Sleep", which reached No. 6. Buchanan released his first solo album, Mid Air, in 2012. BBC Music described it as "a masterpiece". Mid Air was met with widespread acclaim from music critics. At Metacritic, which assigns a normalized rating out of 100 to reviews from mainstream publications, the album received an average score of 82 based on nine reviews, indicating "universal acclaim". The aggregator AnyDecentMusic? has the critical consensus of the album at a 7.8 out of 10, based on fourteen reviews. The album was included on Uncut's Top 75 albums of 2012 list at number 14.

His work, both with the Blue Nile and as a solo artist, has appeared with long intervals between.

== Influences ==
Buchanan's work, including four albums with the Blue Nile and one solo album, has received critical praise although has met with relatively modest commercial success. Buchanan is often described as reticent to perform and as a perfectionist who has discarded many songs during the creative process. His songs have been covered by artists including Tom Jones, Rod Stewart, Annie Lennox, and Isaac Hayes. Bono and Matty Healy have cited him as an influence.

== Discography ==
=== Studio albums ===
Title	Details	Peak chart positions	
Title	Details	SCO	UK
Mid Air	Released: 21 May 2012; Label: Newsroom; Formats: CD, streaming, digital download	1	14

== Personal life ==
Buchanan was once romantically involved with American actress Rosanna Arquette. As of 2012, Buchanan lived in Glasgow.

== See also ==
- List of Scottish musicians
- Music of Scotland
