= Peace at Last (The Blue Nile album) =

Studio album by The Blue Nile
- Released: 10 June 1996
- Genre: Sophisti-pop
- Length: 44:53
- Label: Warner Bros.
- Producer: The Blue Nile

The Blue Nile chronology
Hats (1989)	Peace at Last (1996)	High (2004)

Singles from Peace at Last
- 1. "Happiness" Released: September 1996

Audio sample
- Happiness: file; help

Peace at Last is the third studio album by Scottish band The Blue Nile, released on 10 June 1996 via Warner Bros. Records.

Following the reissue of their first two albums in 2012 as 2-CD deluxe editions, Peace at Last was also reissued in a similar 2-CD version on 3 March 2014.

== Background ==
Peace at Last was a considerable musical departure for the band, marking a shift towards a more acoustic sound. Unlike their prior two albums A Walk Across the Rooftops and Hats, which featured electronic instrumentation almost exclusively, Peace at Last was primarily driven by Paul Buchanan's acoustic guitar. A gospel choir made a brief appearance on the lead single, "Happiness".

== Critical reception ==
Professional ratings
Review scores
Source	Rating
AllMusic	3/5 stars
Entertainment Weekly	B
The Guardian	4/5 stars
The Irish Times	4/5 stars
Mojo	3/5 stars
NME	3/10
Q	5/5 stars
Record Collector	3/5 stars
Rolling Stone	2/5 stars
Uncut	7/10

Critical reaction to Peace at Last was mixed. Despite some initial high praise, including a five-star review from Q, in the years following the album's release it remained largely overshadowed by A Walk Across the Rooftops and Hats.

== Track listing ==
All songs written by Paul Buchanan, except where noted.

1. "Happiness" – 4:39
2. "Tomorrow Morning" – 4:15
3. "Sentimental Man" – 5:05
4. "Love Came Down" – 3:35
5. "Body and Soul" – 5:16
6. "Holy Love" – 2:42
7. "Family Life" – 5:21
8. "War Is Love" – 3:33
9. "God Bless You Kid" (Robert Bell, Buchanan) – 4:56
10. "Soon" – 5:27

=== 2014 Remastered Collector's Edition CD bonus disc ===
1. "Soon" (Laurel Canyon Mix) – 5:30
2. "War Is Love" (New Vocal Mix) – 4:46
3. "Turn Yourself Around" (Bell, Buchanan) – 4:46
4. "Holy Love" (Picture Mix) – 4:03
5. "A Certain Kind of Angel" (Bell, Buchanan) (unreleased demo) – 5:06
6. "There Was a Girl" – 5:28

== Personnel ==
The Blue Nile:

- Robert Bell – bass, synthesizer
- Paul Buchanan – vocals, guitar, synthesizer
- Paul Joseph Moore – keyboards, synthesizer

Additional musicians:

- Craig Armstrong – string orchestration ("Family Life")
- Calum Malcolm – keyboard
- Eddie Tate & Friends – gospel choir ("Happiness")
- Nigel Thomas – drums

Technical:

- The Blue Nile – producer
- Calum Malcolm – engineer

== Charts ==
Chart (1996)	Peak position
New Zealand Albums (RMNZ)	46
Scottish Albums (OCC)	3
UK Albums (OCC)	13
US Heatseekers Albums (Billboard)	48

== Release history ==
Region	Date	Label	Format	Catalog
United Kingdom and Europe	10 June 1996	Warner Bros.	LP	9362-45848-1
United Kingdom and Europe	10 June 1996	Warner Bros.	cassette	9362-45848-4
United Kingdom and Europe	10 June 1996	Warner Bros.	CD	9362-45848-2
United States	11 June 1996	Warner Bros.	LP	45848-1
United States	11 June 1996	Warner Bros.	CD	45848-2
Canada	11 June 1996	Warner Bros.	CD	CDW 45848
United Kingdom and Europe	3 March 2014	Virgin/Universal	remastered 2-CD set	LKHCDR 3
