= Headlights on the Parade =

Single by The Blue Nile

from the album Hats
- B-side: "Easter Parade"; "Halfway to Paradise"
- Released: 1990
- Genre: New wave
- Length: 3:59 (single version); 6:11 (album version)
- Label: Linn Records (UK); A&M (US)
- Songwriter(s): Paul Buchanan
- Producer(s): The Blue Nile

The Blue Nile singles chronology
"The Downtown Lights" (1989)	"Headlights on the Parade" (1990)	"Saturday Night" (1991)

"Headlights on the Parade" is a song by Scottish band The Blue Nile, released in 1990 as the second single from their second studio album Hats (1989). The song was written by Paul Buchanan and produced by the band. It reached number 72 in the UK Singles Chart and remained in the top 100 for four weeks.

== Background ==
In a 1990 interview with Melody Maker, Paul Buchanan said of the song's message, "It's about being alive and therefore lots of things, happy and sad, happen to you simultaneously, so what do you hold on to, really?"

== Release ==
"Headlights on the Parade" was released to coincide with the band's UK tour. For its release as a single, the song was remixed and shortened by Bob Clearmountain.

== Music video ==
The song's music video was directed by Dominic Sena and produced by Aris McGarry for Propaganda Films.

== Critical reception ==
Upon its release, Robin Smith of Record Mirror noted that despite the long wait between releases from the Blue Nile, "every one of their ambient anthems is worth waiting for". He described "Headlights on the Parade" as "a bitter-sweet tale of woe for those lonely moments at three o'clock in the morning when it's raining outside and there's nobody to love". Simon Reynolds of Melody Maker picked it as one of the magazine's "singles of the week" and praised it as "another panoramic, cinematic beauty off Hats." He added that the song was "far too awe-stricken, spacious and heavy to make it as a hit single".

Stuart Bailie of NME considered it to be a "fine song" and noted that the original album version was "cinematic" and "nicely done". He felt that Clearmountain's remix and editing was "a bit vulgar", though it added "a few funky angles" on the track. He commented, "It's certainly not so splendidly grey, and you can't be sure about the snare crack and the sequencer coming so far up front, [but] it's probably the mark of a good song that it can endure the butcher slab experience." In the US, Billboard wrote, "Another perfect pop single with a sophisticated flair from the excellent Hats. AC could find solace in this gingerly paced effort, as could clubs with a tasteful remix."

In a review of Hats, Paul Robicheau of The Boston Globe wrote, "The group crosses dusky, percolating keyboard layers with the grey vocals of Paul Buchanan to build a subtle splendor on 'The Downtown Lights' and 'Headlights on the Parade'." Philip Booth of The Tampa Tribune stated, "'Headlights on the Parade' offers bass gurgles and soft acoustic-piano swashes."

The song is included in the 2011 book 1001 Songs You Must Hear Before You Die by Robert Dimery, who wrote, "Like its parent album, 'Headlights on the Parade' shimmers in the rain, bristles with romance, and mocks its refined setting with real passion from Buchanan." Jason Ankeny of AllMusic selected the song as an AMG Pick Track.

== Track listing ==
7" and cassette single

1. "Headlights on the Parade" (Bob Clearmountain Remix) - 3:59
2. "Headlights on the Parade" (Album Version) - 6:11

12" and CD single

1. "Headlights on the Parade" (Bob Clearmountain Remix) - 3:59
2. "Headlights on the Parade" (Album Version) - 6:11
3. "Easter Parade" - 4:01

12" single (US promo)

1. "Headlights on the Parade" - 3:53
2. "Halfway to Paradise" - 2:01

CD single (US promo)

1. "Headlights on the Parade" (Remix) - 3:59
2. "Headlights on the Parade" (LP Version) - 6:11

== Personnel ==
The Blue Nile

- Paul Buchanan
- Robert Bell
- Paul Joseph Moore

Production

- The Blue Nile - producers
- Calum Malcolm - recording

== Charts ==
Chart (1990)	Peak position
UK Singles Chart	72
