= The Downtown Lights =

Single by The Blue Nile

from the album Hats
- B-side: "The Wires Are Down"
- Released: 11 September 1989
- Genre: Art pop; blue-eyed soul
- Length: 4:40 (single version); 6:26 (album version)
- Label: Linn Records; A&M (US)
- Songwriter: Paul Buchanan
- Producer: The Blue Nile

The Blue Nile singles chronology
"Stay" (1984)	"The Downtown Lights" (1989)	"Headlights on the Parade" (1990)

"The Downtown Lights" is a song by Scottish band The Blue Nile, released in 1989 as the lead single from their second studio album Hats. It was written by Paul Buchanan and produced by the band.

"The Downtown Lights" reached No. 67 in the UK and remained in the charts for three weeks. It also reached No. 10 on the Billboard Modern Rock Tracks chart. The song's music video achieved Buzz Bin rotation on MTV.

== Critical reception ==
Upon its release, Music & Media wrote: "Moody, slow-stepping material from the Glaswegian trio. A striking choice as a single as this is not the easiest number to programme." Mick Williams of the Lennox Herald gave the song a 6 out of 10 rating and commented: "'Downtown Lights', while signalling the long-awaited return of Blue Nile, is a trifle disappointing as the band seem to have stood still and failed to progress since their much acclaimed debut disc. Indeed, 'Downtown Lights' could be an outtake from the band's A Walk Across the Rooftops sessions, way back in '84." Lisa Tilston of Record Mirror felt the song was "polite" and "pleasant", but added "nothing much happens except some synth, some singing, and a great bit when the drumming sounds like someone banging on a tupperware box".

In a review of Hats, Peter B. King of The Pittsburgh Press commented: "The album's grabber is "The Downtown Lights". Moving along at a stately, machine-driven uptempo, it builds inexorably with layers of synthesizers and drum programs. Buchanan summons images of cigarettes, magazine stands and forlorn figures in stairwells for his tale of longing and fulfillment in the big city." Paul Robicheau of The Boston Globe wrote: "The group crosses dusky, percolating keyboard layers with the grey vocals of Paul Buchanan to build a subtle splendor on "The Downtown Lights" and "Headlights on the Parade"."

David Thigpen of Rolling Stone commented: "Songs such as "The Downtown Lights" and "Saturday Night" have a sparse, soulful feel that blends the cool, nocturnal languor of Bryan Ferry with the mystical hues of Peter Gabriel." Jason Ankeny of AllMusic stated: "Tracks like "The Downtown Lights" and "From a Late Night Train" are perfectly evocative of their titles: Rich in romantic atmosphere and detail, they conjure a nocturnal fantasy world lit by neon and shrouded in fog."

== Legacy ==
Matty Healy, the lead singer of the English pop rock band The 1975, based their song "Love It If We Made It" off of "The Downtown Lights". In an interview with Entertainment Weekly, he said: "I wanted to reference that song; I didn't want to hide away from referencing it. I wanted it to be fucking obvious to people that know." In 2024, Taylor Swift's song "Guilty as Sin?" from her album The Tortured Poets Department contained the opening lyrics "Drowning in the Blue Nile, he sent me 'Downtown Lights', I hadn't heard it in a while." Many publications interpreted the lyrics as referencing Swift's brief relationship with Healy, who has spoken about how The Blue Nile are his favorite band. Streaming numbers for "The Downtown Lights" rose from 3,000 in the four-day period before the release of Swift's album to 48,000 in the same period immediately after, an increase of 1,400%.

== Track listing ==
7" single

1. "The Downtown Lights" - 4:40
2. "The Wires Are Down" - 5:40

12" and CD single

1. "The Downtown Lights" - 6:26
2. "The Wires Are Down" - 5:40
3. "Halfway to Paradise" (instrumental) - 2:03

12" single (US promo)

1. "The Downtown Lights" - 6:26
2. "The Downtown Lights" - 4:40
3. "The Wires Are Down" - 5:40

CD single (US promo)

1. "The Downtown Lights" (Album version) - 6:26
2. "The Downtown Lights" (Edit version) - 4:40

CD single (US promo)

1. "The Downtown Lights" - 4:05
2. "Headlights On the Parade" - 3:53
3. "Saturday Night" - 4:01

== Personnel ==
The Blue Nile

- Paul Buchanan
- Robert Bell
- Paul Joseph Moore

Production

- The Blue Nile - producers
- Calum Malcolm - recording

== Charts ==
Chart (1989–90)	Peak position
UK Singles (Official Charts)	67
US Alternative Airplay (Billboard)	10

== Cover versions ==
- In 1995, Scottish singer Annie Lennox released a version of the song on her second solo album Medusa. In an article she wrote for The Independent, Lennox revealed why she chose to record the song: "I just couldn't resist this. Landscape of sound - instrumental gorgeous melancholic drift..."
- In 1995, British singer Rod Stewart included a version on his seventeenth studio album A Spanner in the Works. Stewart's version was produced by Trevor Horn who listed Hats as one of his favourite albums in an article by The Quietus in 2019. He stated: "I came to [Hats] when I was working with Rod Stewart. Suddenly from nowhere he was all "I've heard this song, Trevor, I fucking love it!" And it was "The Downtown Lights" off this album. I met Paul Buchanan up in Scotland years later, and he told me he liked Rod's version, and I was so pleased."
- In 2006, Scala & Kolacny Brothers included a version on their fifth album It All Leads to This.
- In 2014, American indie band Small Black recorded the song for their EP Real People.
- In 2018, fellow Glaswegian band Chvrches covered the song live at the Ryman Auditorium in Nashville, Tennessee.
- In 2018, American indie pop band Pure Bathing Culture recorded a full album cover of Hats, including "The Downtown Lights".
- In 2023, Scottish indie rock band Lucia & the Best Boys released a live cover on YouTube
