= Mid Air (Paul Buchanan album) =

2012 studio album

Studio album by Paul Buchanan
- Released: 21 May 2012
- Length: 36:12
- Label: Newsroom

Paul Buchanan chronology
High (2004)	Mid Air (2012)

Mid Air is the debut solo studio album by Scottish musician Paul Buchanan. It was released on 21 May 2012, through Newsroom Records.

The album topped the Scottish Albums Chart, while peaking at number 14 on the UK Albums Chart. Its promotional single "Mid Air" reached only No. 42 on the UK Independent Singles Chart and No. 11 on the UK Independent Singles Breakers Chart.

== Critical reception ==
Professional ratings
Aggregate scores
Source	Rating
AnyDecentMusic?	7.8/10
Metacritic	82/100
Review scores
Source	Rating
The Arts Desk	5/5 stars
Consequence of Sound	4/5 stars
The Irish Times	4/5 stars
Mojo	4/5 stars
musicOMH	4/5 stars
The New Zealand Herald	4/5 stars
PopMatters	8/10
Q	3/5 stars
The Scotsman	3/5 stars
Uncut	9/10

Mid Air was met with widespread acclaim from music critics. At Metacritic, which assigns a normalized rating out of 100 to reviews from mainstream publications, the album received an average score of 82 based on nine reviews, indicating "universal acclaim". The aggregator AnyDecentMusic? has the critical consensus of the album at a 7.8 out of 10, based on fourteen reviews.

Graeme Thomson of The Arts Desk gave the album the highest 5 out of 5 score, saying: "Mid Air isn't content to be simply blue and beautiful. There is real joy here, and a rather heroic attempt to embrace life in all its colours and complexities". London-based monthly magazine Uncut also praised the album, stating: "Mid Air amounts to 14 enigmatic variations on this mood, just piano, voice, the occasional pale moonbeam of orchestration, which miraculously never feels monotonous or morose". Justin Gerber of Consequence of Sound wrote: "these tracks offer hope in the face of inevitable despair. They sneak up on you like the flame of a lighter, nicking your fingers as you try lighting a cigarette in the wind" and added: "the former frontman of U.K. darlings The Blue Nile isn't well-known in the States, and who knows if he'll ever get his due here--he's already 56. But with Mid Air, he's certainly given himself a shot". Rosie Wilby of musicOMH found "Buchanan's vocals and dancing piano playing are bolstered only by airy synthetic tapestries of strings that float in and hover over closing choruses, as if wary of waking the sleeping city", with the following conclusion: "many Blue Nile classics whispered their way to five minutes without outstaying their welcome, and there's plenty here that could have done the same. It's a minor quibble, however, when an album sounds as lovingly crafted, honest and subtly passionate as this". Maria Schurr of PopMatters felt that "on Mid Air Buchanan has consoled us with signature world-weary comfort and has done so finely". Brian Boyd of The Irish Times wrote: "these 13 songs (most less than three minutes) and one instrumental feature vocals, piano and the odd hushed piece of orchestration. Variations on a musical theme, perhaps, but Buchanan covers quite some lyrical distance here, from bemused bystander to lacerated laureate".

Chris Roberts of BBC Music called it "the 36 minutes of Mid Air [is] a masterpiece", Andy Gill of The Independent called it "an unashamedly middle-aged affair, from the quietly moving affirmation of devotion in "Two Children" to the comforting reverie of "I Remember You"," and Mojo reviewer called it "a 2AM album of sheer, devastating beauty".

In mixed reviews, Fiona Shepherd of The Scotsman wrote: "it sounds like a work he created by sneaking into the studio at night when everyone had gone home and he could indulge his hangdog tendencies in peace and solitude". Blurt magazine reviewer stated: "there are certainly times when a bit more instrumentation would have enhanced the presentation - even sub-three minute songs can become dreary when ballads predominate and they're sung in a near-whisper". Q magazine critic stated: "the effect's akin to eavesdropping on a suite of grateful elegies for life's ordinary dramas of love and hope" and resumed: "the accompanying impression of sincerity is enough to save unashamedly sentimental tunes such as Wedding Party and Two Children from mawkishness".

The album was included on Uncut's Top 75 albums of 2012 list at number 14.

== Track listing ==
All tracks are written by Paul Buchanan.

No.	Title	Length
1.	"Mid Air"	2:32
2.	"Half the World"	2:56
3.	"Cars in the Garden"	2:49
4.	"Newsroom"	1:54
5.	"I Remember You"	2:48
6.	"Buy a Motor Car"	2:37
7.	"Wedding Party"	2:36
8.	"Two Children"	2:35
9.	"Summer's on Its Way"	2:29
10.	"My True Country"	2:17
11.	"A Movie Magazine"	2:24
12.	"Tuesday"	2:12
13.	"Fin de siècle"	2:01
14.	"After Dark"	3:56
Total length:		36:12

Deluxe edition
No.	Title	Length
15.	"Have You Ever Been Lonely?"	3:05
16.	"My True Country (Robert Bell Piano Mix)"	2:18
17.	"After Dark (Instrumental)"	4:04
18.	"Two Children (Piano)"	2:06
19.	"Lost"	2:24
20.	"Tuesday (Instrumental)"	2:05
21.	"Half the World (Live at Liss Ard Festival 2012, Eire)"	2:54
22.	"A Movie Magazine (Instrumental)"	2:20
23.	"Buy a Motor Car (Robert Bell Elegance Remix)"	2:35
24.	"God Is Laughing"	3:41
Total length:		63:44

== Personnel ==
- Paul Buchanan – songwriter, vocals, photography
- Cameron Malcolm – recording
- Calum Malcolm – mastering
- Amy Knowles – art direction, design
- Mingyuan Hu – photography
- Peter Rafferty – photography
- Nick Maroudias – photography

== Charts ==
Chart performance for Mid Air
Chart (2012)	Peak position
Scottish Albums (OCC)	1
UK Albums (OCC)	14
UK Independent Albums (OCC)	4
