= Tinseltown in the Rain =

1984 single by the Blue Nile

Single by The Blue Nile

from the album A Walk Across the Rooftops
- B-side: "Heatwave"
- Released: 20 August 1984
- Genre: Sophisti-pop
- Length: 5:57
- Label: Linn; A&M
- Songwriter(s): Paul Buchanan, Robert Bell
- Producer(s): Paul Buchanan, Robert Bell

The Blue Nile singles chronology
"Stay" (1984)	"Tinseltown in the Rain" (1984)	"The Downtown Lights" (1989)

"Tinseltown in the Rain" is a song by Scottish pop band the Blue Nile. It was released as the second single from their 1984 debut album A Walk Across the Rooftops. The song was written and produced by lead singer Paul Buchanan and bassist Robert Bell. It has been described as an "ode to the city" of Glasgow. The song reached No. 87 on the UK Singles Chart. It was a bigger hit in the Netherlands, peaking at No. 28 on the Dutch Top 40.

== Background ==
"Tinseltown in the Rain" helped The Blue Nile land a record contract. Audio engineer Calum Malcolm had been given money to record music by RSO Records and was also friends with Ivor Tiefenbrun, the founder of audio equipment company Linn Products. Malcolm played an early demo of "Tinseltown in the Rain" when staff members asked him to test out the speakers, which impressed Linn Records enough that the label contacted The Blue Nile to offer them a record deal.

The song has been described as A Walk Across the Rooftops' most upbeat track. In a 2013 interview with Dutch television program Top 2000 a Gogo, Paul Buchanan stated that "Tinseltown is a metaphor. It’s whatever your dream is, whatever your Tinseltown was, whatever you lost. And I think in our minds what was interesting to us was the kind of universal nature of cities… Glasgow’s obviously not the same scale as New York, but if you just shrunk it down to a corner, it could be. It could be anywhere."

Buchanan said that the song's guitars "made us think of traffic". The song also contains "strident piano chords, sweeping strings and one of Buchanan’s finest vocal performances, his joy irrepressible as he reassures himself, 'Do I love you? Yes, I love you!'"

== Commercial performance ==
The song was The Blue Nile's first to chart on the UK Singles Chart, reaching No. 87 on the week ending in 1 September 1984. In the Netherlands, it bubbled under the Top 40, peaking at No. 3 on the Tipparade before entering the Dutch Top 40 at No. 37 on 13 October 1984. It peaked at No. 28 on the following week and remained on the chart for four weeks.

== Reception ==
Pitchfork's Noah Yoo, for the publication's piece "11 Song Moments We Just Can’t Shake", wrote of the song's climax: "The subtle rebalancing pulls the entire song into focus in a sudden moment of catharsis; a seismic energy shift with the light touch of a feather. For a few seconds, the lights in Tinseltown flicker and pop to life, giving all of its lovers one more chance to say goodbye." GlasgowWorld named it the band's best song. Muriel Gray at Smash Hits said, "As an album track it's sophisticated, subtle and slightly melancholy. Sadly, though, it's also a single, which makes it boring, predictable and slightly weak. Very reminiscent of 70s Steely Dan which, in 1984, is nothing to be proud of."

Speaking about the song's legacy, Buchanan said, "People stop you in the street and say: Oh, 'Tinseltown'; I love 'Tinseltown.' It’s lovely, it really is – but’s a bit like somebody saying, you know I really liked you twenty years ago – when you were good-looking!"

== Legacy ==
"Tinseltown in the Rain" remains a beloved staple in the Netherlands, regularly appearing on NPO Radio 2's annual Top 2000 songs of all time countdown. It reached its highest position at No. 445 in 2003.

== In popular culture ==
The song, or more specifically, its rhythm section, was also used as the theme to the TV series, Tinsel Town, set in Glasgow, and aired, firstly, on BBC Choice in 2000, and was then repeated on BBC 2 the following year. An abridged second and final series aired in 2002. Also prominently used in the opening theme was the line, "ah-oh Tinsel Town", taken from the end of the middle 8 section of the original song.

== Cover versions ==
Andrea Corr released a cover of the song as the first single from her 2011 album Lifelines. The Twang released a version of the song in 2019, as the third single from their fifth album If Confronted Just Go Mad.

== Charts ==
Chart (1984)	Peak position
Netherlands (Dutch Top 40)	28
Netherlands (Single Top 100)	29
UK Singles (OCC)	87
