= Happiness (The Blue Nile song) =

Single by The Blue Nile

from the album Peace at Last
- Released: 1996
- Length: 4:39 (album version); 4:28 (single version)
- Label: Warner
- Songwriter: Paul Buchanan
- Producer: The Blue Nile

The Blue Nile singles chronology
"Saturday Night" (1991)	"Happiness" (1996)	"Sentimental Man" (1996)

"Happiness" is a song by Scottish band The Blue Nile, which was released in 1996 as the lead single from their third studio album Peace at Last. It was written by Paul Buchanan and produced by the band. "Happiness" reached No. 88 on the UK Singles Chart and remained on the Top 100 for two weeks.

== Critical reception ==
In a review of Peace at Last, The Dundee Courier & Advertiser wrote, "Peace at Last arrives in superb style with the opening 'Happiness', a song which has little to do with its title but is as magnificently grandiose as anything you're likely to hear." Music & Media described "Happiness" as "a great gospel song, climaxing with the help of a choir".

In a 1996 feature on the band, George Byrne said, "There's the presence of a gospel choir at the close of 'Happiness' which caused me to jump when I first heard it but even that departure from [the band's] usual form fits in perfectly with the tone of the song." Adrian Dawson of The Stage described the song as a "hymn to triumph over adversity".

== Track listing ==
Cassette single

1. "Happiness" (Edit) – 4:28
2. "O Lolita" – 3:37

CD single (CD #1)

1. "Happiness" (Edit) – 4:28
2. "O Lolita" – 3:37
3. "War Is Love (A Different Day)" – 3:33

CD single (CD #2)

1. "Happiness" (Edit) – 4:28
2. "New York Man" – 3:55
3. "Wish Me Well" – 4:28

CD single (promo)

1. "Happiness" – 4:28

== Personnel ==
The Blue Nile

- Paul Buchanan – vocals, guitar, synthesizer
- Robert Bell – bass, synthesizer
- Paul Joseph Moore – keyboards, synthesizer

Additional musicians

- Nigel Thomas – drums
- Eddie Tate & Friends – gospel choir

Production

- The Blue Nile – producers
- Calum Malcolm – engineer

Other

- The Blue Nile, Central – sleeve design

== Charts ==
Chart (1996)	Peak position
UK Singles (Official Charts)	88
Scotland Singles (Official Charts)	37
