= Love It If We Made It =

Song by the 1975

Single by the 1975

from the album A Brief Inquiry into Online Relationships
- Released: 19 July 2018
- Genre: Electronic rock
- Length: 4:13
- Label: Dirty Hit; Polydor
- Songwriters: Matthew Healy; George Daniel; Adam Hann; Ross MacDonald
- Producers: Matthew Healy; George Daniel

The 1975 singles chronology
"Give Yourself a Try" (2018)	"Love It If We Made It" (2018)	"TooTimeTooTimeTooTime" (2018)

Music video
- "Love It If We Made It" on YouTube

"Love It If We Made It" is a song by English band the 1975 from their third studio album, A Brief Inquiry into Online Relationships (2018). The song was written by Matty Healy, George Daniel, Adam Hann and Ross MacDonald, while the production was handled by the former two. It was released on 19 July 2018 by Dirty Hit and Polydor Records as the second single from the album. Daniel created the song's production in 2015, while Healy collected daily tabloid headlines from 2016 to 2018 to use as lyrics. They became too humorous, so he rewrote the song to summarize the volatile social and political events in that period, using Prince's "Sign o' the Times" as an inspiration.

A mid-tempo electro-rock ballad, "Love It If We Made It" contains sophisti-pop melodies, harp-like arpeggios, disco riffs and staccato chords. The song also incorporates elements of synth-pop, power pop, funk and pop music. Thematically, it deals with the vices of modern humanity, hypocrisy and disinformation, while the lyrics reference multiple events such as the US national anthem protests, the death of Alan Kurdi, the death of Lil Peep, and the Donald Trump Access Hollywood tape, among others. Healy delivers the track in a stream of consciousness style using a mixture of shouting, screaming and rapping.

Upon release, "Love It If We Made It" received widespread acclaim from contemporary music critics, many of whom deemed it both an album highlight and the record's overall thesis statement. Praise was directed at the song's themes, lyrics, production and Healy's vocal delivery. The track was included on numerous critics year-end lists, and lauded as the best song of 2018 by several publications, including The New York Times and Pitchfork. It later won the 2019 Ivor Novello Award for Best Contemporary Song. It is generally considered among the best songs of the 2010s, a generational anthem and the millennial equivalent to Billy Joel's "We Didn't Start the Fire", with several contemporary critics referring to the track as the 1975's greatest song.

Commercially, "Love It If We Made It" peaked at number ten on the US Billboard Hot Rock & Alternative Songs and number 33 on the UK Singles Chart, while also reaching the top 50 in Scotland, Ireland and Canada. The song was later certified silver by the British Phonographic Industry (BPI). Two music videos were released to accompany the track. The first, created in a vertical format, was released to Spotify on 12 August 2018. The second, directed by Adam Powell, was released on 15 October. The visual depicts the 1975 performing the song as neon-coloured silhouettes, interspersed with found footage-style clips of war and significant pop culture events from the 2010s. The video received positive reviews and was later nominated for Best Rock Video at the 2019 UK Music Video Awards and the 2019 MTV Video Music Awards.

== Writing and recording ==
"It's an interesting one because there's not a lot of context – and a lot of the things that I say in that are kind of direct quotes of people or they're headlines that I've read... [the chorus] is met hopefully, with a genuine positivity."

— Healy, on the narrative perspective of "Love It If We Made It"

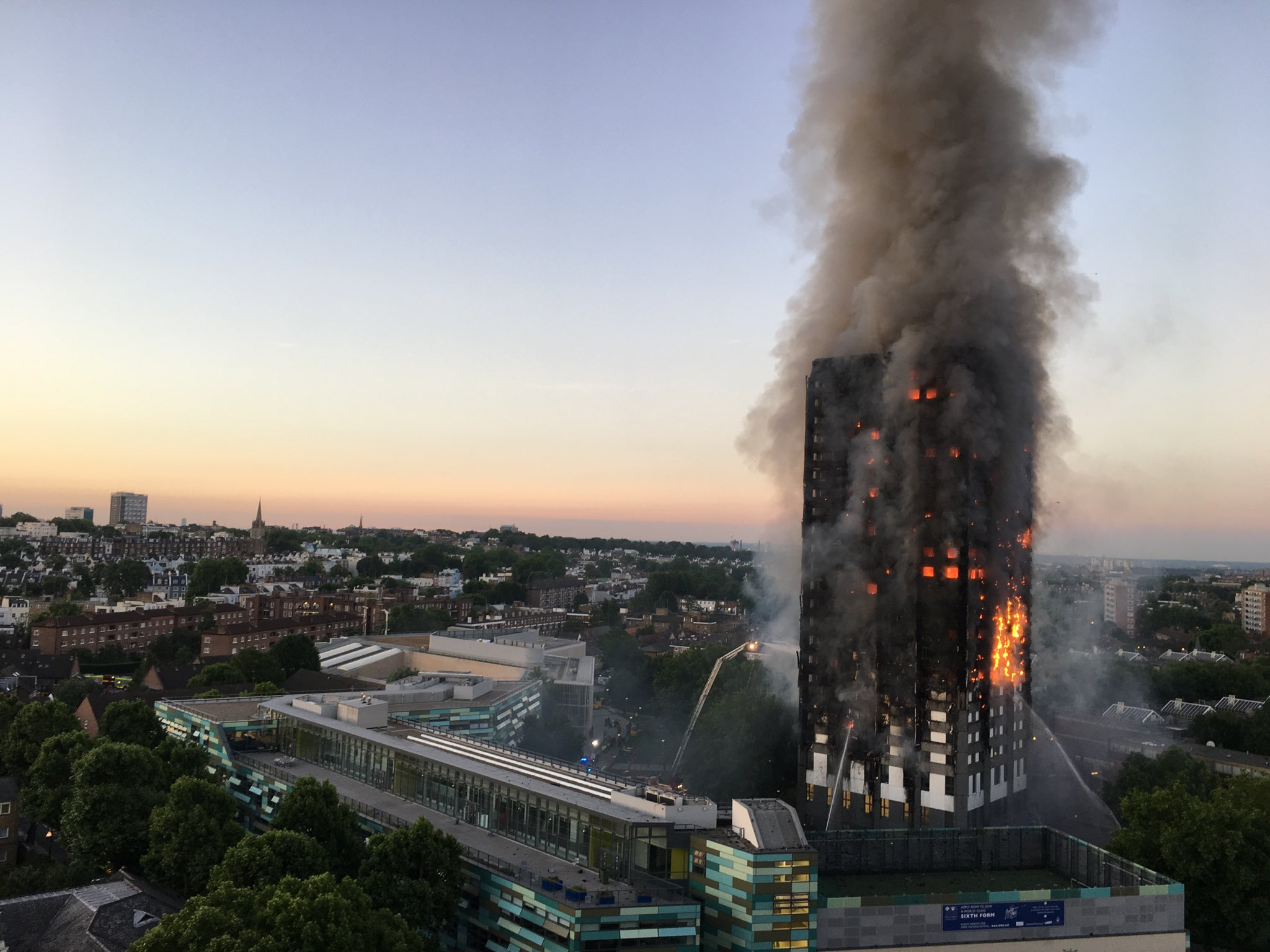
The Grenfell Tower fire had a significant impact on Healy, causing him to transform "Love It If We Made It" into an "outward exorcism".

The instrumentation of "Love It If We Made It" was created by Daniel in 2015. Development of the lyrics began immediately after the 1975 concluded the recording of I Like It When You Sleep, for You Are So Beautiful yet So Unaware of It. The band was inspired by the Blue Nile's Hats (1989), which they frequently listened to during their I Like It When You Sleep Tour. They sought to create something similar but "slightly different [...] like [the] Blue Nile on steroids", and wanted the song to sound "really machine-like, in an industrial sense". In an interview with Entertainment Weekly, Healy said the song was based on "The Downtown Lights", adding: "I didn't want to hide away from referencing it. I wanted it to be fucking obvious to people that know."

Healy requested that Ed Blow, the Dirty Hit product manager, go to the local newsstand every day to grab the daily newspaper. The singer had an idea to collect a list of tabloid headlines and turn them into a song. He realised the headlines had become too slapstick and humorous during the writing process, so the idea was scrapped. The June 2017 Grenfell Tower fire, which occurred close to the Dirty Hit offices, had a significant impact on Healy. According to the singer, the event acted as the song's catalyst, saying, "that's when the song became this outward exorcism".

The first concerted effort to write "Love It If We Made It" occurred in June 2017. While on a flight during the 1975's I Like It When You Sleep Tour, Daniel encouraged Healy to build the song's lyrics around his 2015 instrumental, which consisted of two chords at the time. The singer had the phrase "fucking in a car, shooting heroin" and a line about Eric Garner, but most of the verses did not form until very late into the recording process. He revisited the idea of tabloid headlines, choosing to document the events of 2016 to 2018 in a collection of notes, adding to it every time something angered him. Healy procrastinated work on the song, eventually rewriting it several times. Once the lyrics grew more substantially, he realised it had become a benchmark for A Brief Inquiry into Online Relationships, changing the album's overall structure from a personal, introspective diary of the singer's life into an outward-facing record. Healy did not want to create a protest song, feeling "Love It If We Made It" needed to be an objective summary of events rather than a subjective opinion. To accomplish this, he looked to the narrative of Prince's "Sign o' the Times" (1987), seeking to create a "super modern" version that documents the most political and socially volatile period of the band's life.

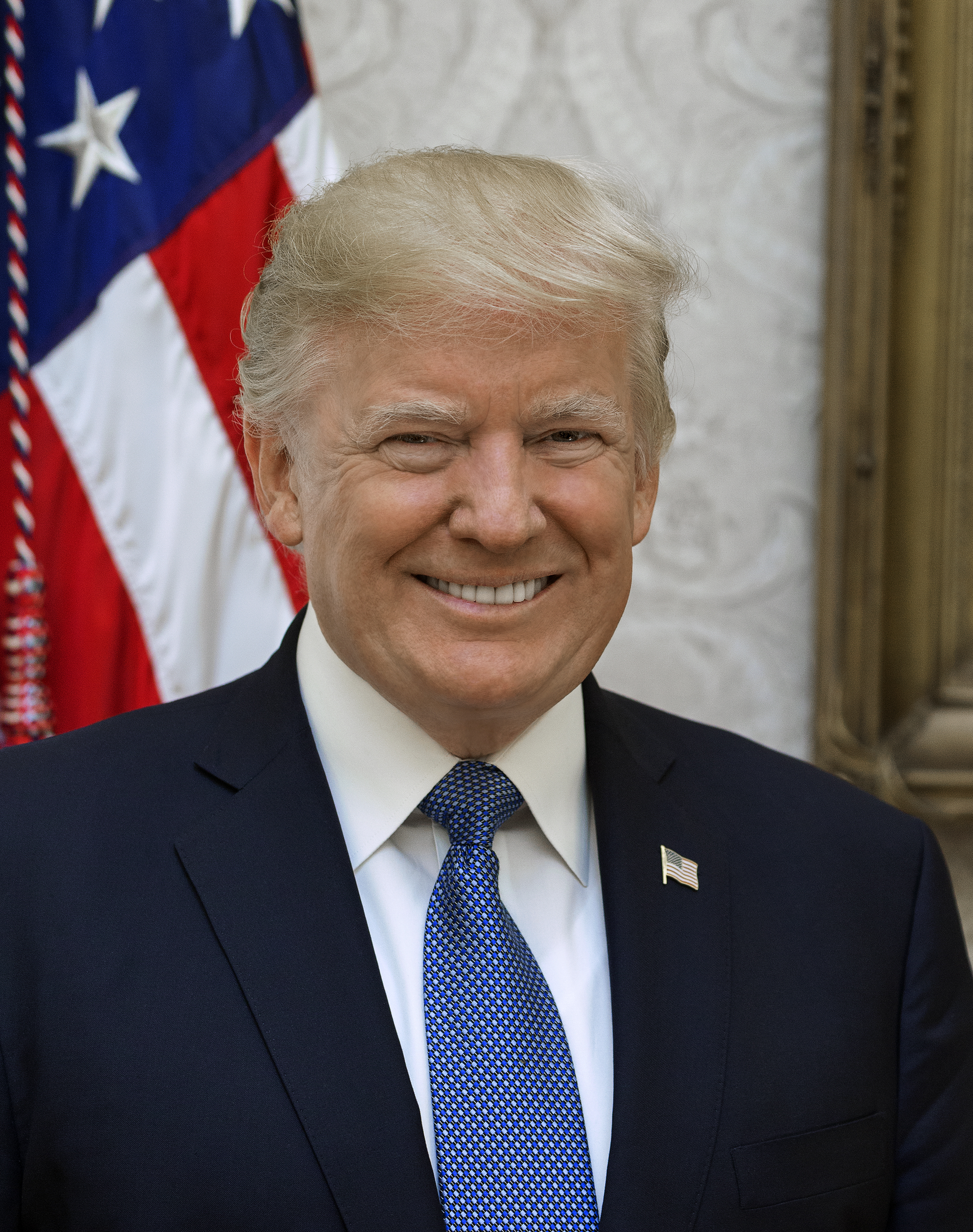
"Love It If We Made It" directly quotes a remark made by then-president of the United States Donald Trump, taken from the Access Hollywood tape.

As the writing process continued, the singer amassed so much content that several lines needed to be removed. Such lyrics included a "Horse Burger Butchered by the British" and one about foreign nurses. Ultimately, Healy remarked that the most challenging part of the songwriting process was making it all rhyme. He composed the bridge as a "dump of ideas", writing down the words that came to his mind in the moment. Healy had previously written "Consultation, degradation, fossil-fueling masturbation / Immigration, liberal kitsch, kneeling on a pitch", followed by a missing gap of seven syllables and the line "excited to be indicted". Having referenced the Twitter interaction between Donald Trump and Kanye West, he sought to incorporate a second famous soundbite from the former president of the United States. While singing the melody to himself in a car, Healy realised that "I moved on her like a bitch" – a remark made by Trump captured on the Access Hollywood tape – fit perfectly. Although the other band members urged him not to include it over fears of further censorship, the singer refused, saying censorship was an acceptable consequence for verbatim quoting the president of the United States.

As the I Like It When You Sleep Tour reached its conclusion, the 1975 returned to the studio to record "Love It If We Made It". Having heard the song in full for the first time, the band felt that it was "fucking crazy", with Healy describing a purity to their reactions. However, he felt uncomfortable recording it. While not being uncomfortable with the lyrics themselves, he was in disbelief over what he was saying, specifically his awareness of how bizarre the world had become. Speaking to Genius, the singer noted that radio stations would censor the line "I moved on her like a bitch", despite the band merely repeating a statement uttered by the president of the United States. Remarking on how unusual it seemed, Healy said, "that's a weird reality, that's weird, that's some Idiocracy kind of stuff".

== Inspiration ==
While "Love It If We Made It" is inspired by the failures of modern life, the 1975 wanted the title to represent their optimism in the human spirit's resilience. One topic that influenced the lyrics was the growing acceptance of alternative facts and post-truth in society. Healy cited the rise of the Flat-Earther movement as an example of this, noting their beliefs contradict tangible physical evidence. On a larger scale, he was interested in global online interconnectedness and the weaponization of the internet, noting its use as a tool to sow distrust, promote lies and spread misinformation. Elsewhere, the singer was partially inspired by conservative pundits Milo Yiannopoulos and Candace Owens. Regarding their ability to be provocative, the singer sought to emulate this and attempted to write lyrics that captured listeners' attention in the "attention economy". Similarly, he borrowed a line from a Trump T-shirt that read: "Trump 2016, fuck your feelings."

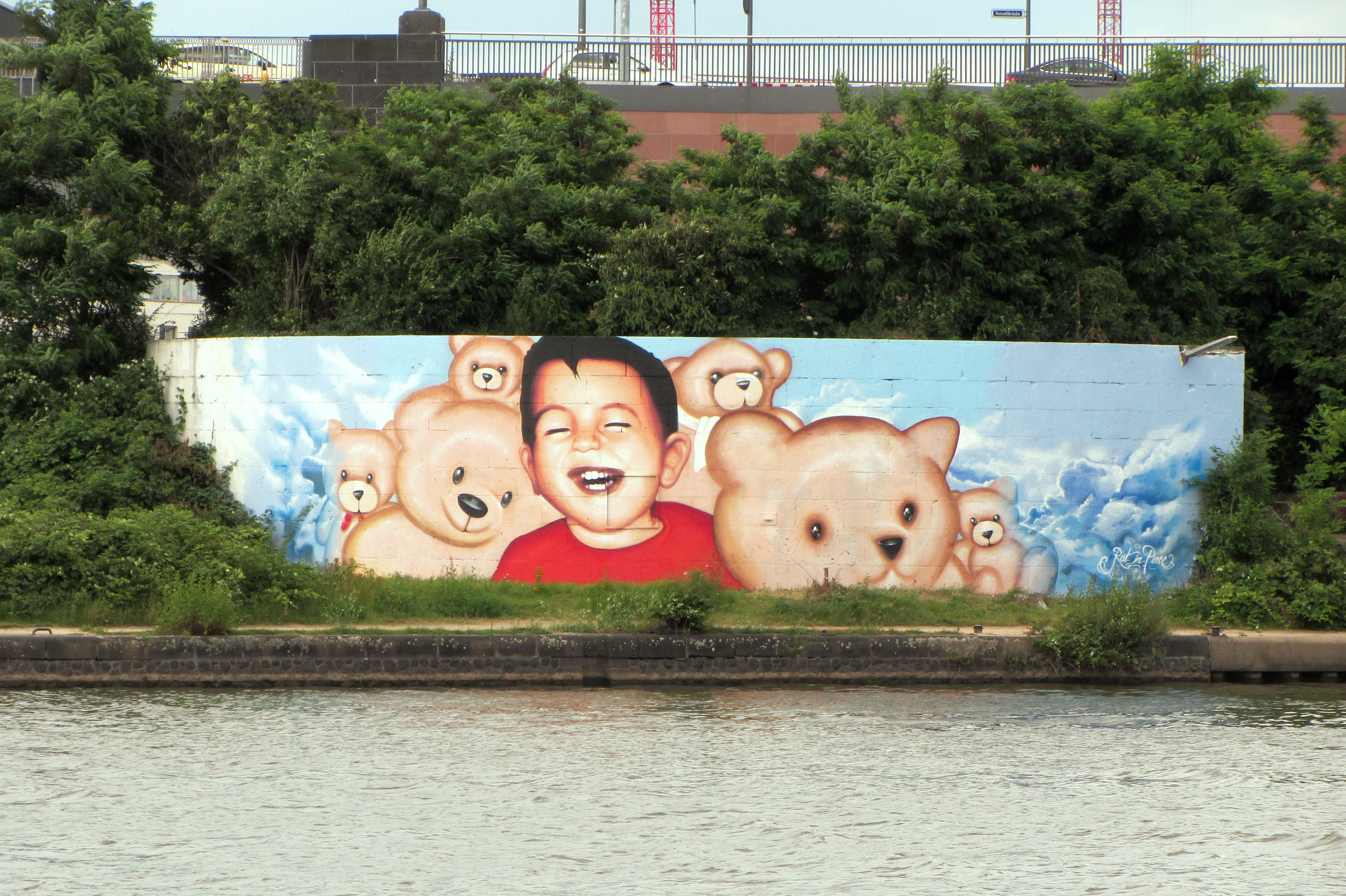
The death of Alan Kurdi, the reaction of the British general public and the insensitivity of the country's conservative-leaning press informed "Love It If We Made It".

The 1975 were inspired by the world's reaction to the death of Alan Kurdi, a three-year-old boy who drowned attempting to cross the Aegean Sea during the European migrant crisis. Healy felt ashamed that it took a picture to garner the sympathy of the British public, while also criticizing the reaction of the conservative-leaning press in the country. Elsewhere, he wanted to pay tribute to Lil Peep, calling him a pioneer. While the singer was not "his biggest fan", he understood the gravity of the rapper's death, saying, "it was just really untimely and really sad, and I literally wanted to celebrate him, if I had an opportunity to do so". Healy's calls for Jesus in the "Love It If We Made It" stemmed from his changing outlook on religion, noting his once rigid and outspoken atheism had softened, which the singer credits to his growing empathy and understanding toward the overall culture of religion.

Healy's use of "daddy" in "Love It If We Made It" stemmed from his fascination with internet meme culture, noting the term has evolved to denote a sexual connotation in the online world. His inspiration to include the "Poison me daddy" line came from the 2018 Salisbury poisoning, saying he was reading about the incident while simultaneously receiving comments from fans calling him "daddy". Elaborating further, the singer said: "[If] you told somebody 15 years ago, 'You're gonna have this computer where people are gonna be calling you daddy, and you're gonna be able to read BBC news at the same time,' it's [a] weird little reality." While recognizing his lack of knowledge regarding the history of anti-black racism in America, the singer wanted to draw attention to a paradox he observed. Healy viewed American culture as fetishizing black people while simultaneously thriving on a prison system that preys on young black men. He portrays this through a neutral observation in "Love It If We Made It", saying he "[does not] have any solutions, but [he is] an artist, it's not [his] job". Similarly, the song addresses the US national anthem protests. Healy was confused by the controversy, noting that American conservative media portrayed the issue as anti-American and anti-democratic, despite traditional American traditions of peaceful protest and standing up for one's beliefs.

== Music and lyrics ==
"Love It If We Made It"
A 27-second sample of "Love It If We Made It" showcasing the song's bridge, with Healy delivering the lyrics in a stream of consciousness style over an industrial and new wave-influenced electropop instrumentation.

Musically, "Love It If We Made It" is a mid-tempo electro-rock ballad with a length of four minutes and 13 seconds (4:13). The song's industrial and new wave-influenced electropop instrumentation makes extensive use of synth-pop, power pop, disco, funk and pop music. According to sheet music published at Musicnotes.com by Hal Leonard Music Publishing, "Love It If We Made It" is set in the time signature of common time with a tempo of 90 beats per minute. The track is composed in the key of E major, with Healy's vocals ranging between the notes of B_{2} and B_{4}. The production of "Love It If We Made It", described by DIY's Will Richards as sharp and harsh, contains sophisti-pop melodies, a soaring choral section, squealing filtered disco riffs, a psychedelic, pulsating metric, gleaming, jittery electropop synths, "gigantic", insistent drums, harp-like arpeggios and hazy electronic production elements. Healy's delivers the song in a stream of consciousness style, sung with impassioned vocals variously described as a near-shout, scream, howl and shout-rap.

"Love It If We Made It" opens with near-silence for the first 24 seconds, containing a simple set of staccato chords, swirls of sparkling synths, wind chimes, piano notes and a quietly pulsing keyboard–providing the backbone of the production. The instrumentation gradually rises in intensity until reaching the climax in its glissando, signifying the beginning of the first verse. Healy opens the verse with a 16-word couplet that captures the feelings of youth, disaffection and desperation with "extreme concision", as described by Pryor Stroud of Slant Magazine, singing: "We're fucking in a car, shooting heroin / Saying controversial things just for the hell of it." As it progresses, a twinkling synth is added to provide atmospherics. In the first chorus, Healy repeats the song's title several times with increasing fervour, characterised by Moreland as both a plea and an avowal to make a difference. The second chorus "explodes" into a funk-influenced refrain backed by soaring synths, bursts of funk guitars, electric guitars and a gospel choir of synthesised backing vocals. The song ends with staccato strings that Ryan Dombal of Pitchfork compared to a clock, "ruthlessly ticking down the seconds".

Thematically, "Love It If We Made It" deals with the vices of modern humanity, hypocrisy and disinformation, and encourages a revolt against the turbulence and turmoil present in the modern political and cultural climate. In the first verse, Healy speaks on the opioid epidemic, anti-black racism, police brutality, the Black Lives Matter movement, cybersecurity breaches, the prison-industrial complex in the United States, fake news and the singer's heroin addiction. The second verse addresses internet culture, the death of Lil Peep, the Syrian refugee crisis, the drowning of Alan Kurdi and religion. The third and final verse contains two quotes from Trump—including a Twitter interaction with West—highlighting the former's overt bigotry, racism and prejudice, alongside references to the right-wing immigration debate and the US national anthem protests. Quinn Moreland of Pitchfork noted that while the verses depict a grim, exhausting reality, they are balanced by the hopeful and "technicolour" choruses. Jamieson echoed this opinion, saying the choruses provide the "silver lining to our world's black cloud, the first bright dawn after a storm".

=== Analysis ===
Chris Richards of The Washington Post considers "Love It If We Made It" to be a contemporary protest song, finding Healy's frustration with capitalism is misdirected at modernity. Mitch Mosk of Atwood Magazine also identified it as a protest song, capturing the feelings of overwhelmingness and hope while providing a wakeup call that demands a change be made in society. Similarly, Roisin O'Connor of The Independent called "Love It If We Made It" a generational protest song, on par with Billy Joel's "We Didn't Start the Fire" (1989) and Michael Jackson's "Man in the Mirror" (1988). In contrast, El Hunt of NME argued that rather than a protest song, it a "brash, absurdist polemic that captures the age in which we live". Healy has also denied the protest label, saying: "Hopefully it could be used on a montage for the times, but it's not going to change the times [...] It doesn't provide a solution." Jessica Sager of Parade called "Love It If We Made It" a furious attack on societal issues that plagued the second half of the 2010s, "from the opioid epidemic to fossil fuels to racism, for-profit prisons and xenophobia—to name a few".

Jenny Li of Soundigest felt "Love It If We Made It" reflects the 2010s and the impact of the shifting political, social, and technological climate on humanity. She wrote that rather than condemn specific people or policies, Healy touches each topic in a raw, naked fashion that implores the listener to judge for themselves. Dan Stubbs of NME similarly commented that the singer presents no particular opinion but rather highlights real-world horrors which have become normalised, asking the listener to draw their own conclusions. His observations were echoed by Consequence of Sound writer David Sackllah, who said that while the song's lyrical juxtaposition mimics a social media feed—where horrendous tragedies "sit side by side with the mundane in a clinical detachment"—Healy offers a resilient glimpse of hope. Matt Miller of Esquire noted the chorus channels a sardonic optimism. Claire Biddles of The Line of Best Fit also observed a resilient tone, saying the song contains one of the few moments of hope in A Brief Inquiry into Online Relationships.

Joe Cascarelli of The New York Times felt "Love It If We Made It" serves as the thesis statement to A Brief Inquiry into Online Relationships, noting that while it is nearly impossible to classify, it could be compared to "We Didn't Start the Fire". Jake Iverson of the Bozeman Daily Chronicle called "Love It If We Made It" a "thunderous rock song" and "an anthem of anthems that sounds at once incongruous and totally in sync with the rest of the decade". Biddles wrote that the composition was levelled, loud and persistent, saying: "The song itself is a monolith, maximalist to the extreme. Each electronic trill and whoosh is like digital overspill from the overpacked whole." Troy Smith of Cleveland Magazine deemed the song a "soaring romp that gets bigger and bigger as it goes on". Jisselle Fernandez of B-Sides called the song a "plea for modern society to change their destructive ways and find a possible solution over this course of madness while electro-pop synths pulsate".

== Release and promotion ==
In early 2018, various billboards began emerging in major cities containing lyrics from "Love It If We Made It". One poster read "poison me daddy", which Tom Connick of NME called a "tongue-in-cheek reference to the all-or-nothing fan culture employed by modern audiences". A second poster also emerged in the same fashion, reading "Rest In Peace Lil Peep", referencing the rapper's death in 2017. The billboards acted as a pilgrimage for the 1975's fanbase, with fans travelling to the billboards to take selfies. On 6 July 2018, the band began mailing 1,500 care packages to random fans. The packages contained a typewritten letter that quotes the opening lyrics of "Love It If We Made It", along with a sentence that mixes a partial quote from the Donald Trump Access Hollywood tape with a headline from the Daily Mirror, reading: "When you're a star, they let you do it. You can do anything. 5 ways to save money as parents of three after the birth of the royal baby." On 11 July, a press packet was mailed to media organizations containing a single piece of paper. The paper announced that "on 19 July the 1975 release 'Love It If We Made It'". The packet also contained the song's lyrics and the confirmation that it would serve as the second single from A Brief Inquiry into Online Relationships. The band later confirmed the song's release on Twitter. "Love It If We Made It" was officially released on 19 July 2018.

== Reception ==
=== Critical response ===
"Love it or hate it, no other single bottled the essence of 2018 so completely—the mind-numbing, flattening effect of the news cycle, the difficulty of extricating oneself from the grid (coupled with the deep desire to do just that), the anarchic urge to sometimes just throw up your hands and scream 'POISON ME DADDY' at an indifferent sky. It was a strange and fractious year, and 'Love It If We Made It' was its defining song."

— Lindsay Zoladz of The Ringer on naming "Love It If We Made It" the best song of 2018.

Upon release, "Love It If We Made It" received acclaim from contemporary music critics and is considered by numerous reviewers to be one of the best songs of the 2010s, the 1975's greatest song, a generational anthem and the millennial answer to "We Didn't Start the Fire". It later won the 2019 Ivor Novello Award for Best Contemporary Song, presented by the British Academy of Songwriters, Composers, and Authors (BASCA). Claire Shaffer of Rolling Stone attributes the song's widespread acclaim and "anthem" status to its ability to capture an earnest and online feeling of 2010s dread, mixing the feelings of panic and disdain familiar to social media users and Americans living under president Trump.

Harry Harris of The Skinny deemed "Love It If We Made It" one of the three standouts from A Brief Inquiry into Online Relationships, describing the song as "an anxiety-riddled ['We Didn't Start the Fire'] set to Blue Nile-esque opulence". Similarly, Dorian Lynskey of Q declared it one of four highlights from the album. Dombal opined that "Love It If We Made It" is the album's apex and "the rare Anthem for Our Time that actually gets the job done", explicitly calling the line "Thank you Kanye, very cool!" one of 2018's best lyrics. Richards viewed the song as the album's cacophonous centrepiece, writing that Healy "claws some hope from the mire". Sackllah deemed it one of the album's three essential songs, calling it a career highlight for the 1975 that reveals their true potential. Ben Kaye of Consequence of Sound deemed "Love It If We Made It" the album's thesis, noting it sounds like a 2018 version of "We Didn't Start the Fire". Elaborating further, he said: "Writing about how completely twisted our world is right now can easily become pandering or trite, but Matty Healy sounds sincerely passionate here as he nails the cultural milieu."

Biddles declared "Love It If We Made It" the 1975's masterpiece, writing the song is "a relentless and harrowing mirror of contemporary life". Elizabeth Dearden-Williams of Varsity called it the 1975's career-defining track. Connick declared it the best song of the band's career, noting that few songs successfully capture cultural moments in the same way, while describing it as "a snapshot of the present day, from Twitter meltdowns to incendiary tabloid headlines, drug habits to young, dead rappers, its lyrics span the whole of modern consciousness in just four minutes". Coscarelli wrote that "Love It If We Made It" is likely to become the band's defining song. David Hayter of 411Mania wrote: "'Love It If We Made' represents the exact moment when [t]he 1975 transitioned from the hottest indie band in the world to the voice of a generation." Jennifer Irving of Consequence of Sound felt the song serves as a culmination of the band's growth over the decade. Spencer Kornhaber of The Atlantic described "Love It If We Made It" as the "grab-bag political anthem of [the modern] era", including it in a list of historic pop tracks meant to represent the anxiety of the 2020 United States presidential election. Jake Indiana of Highsnobiety said the band "have truly captured lightning in a bottle", writing that "Love It If We Made It" represents "the first – and by measure, only – song that comes remotely close to being an anthem for our era".

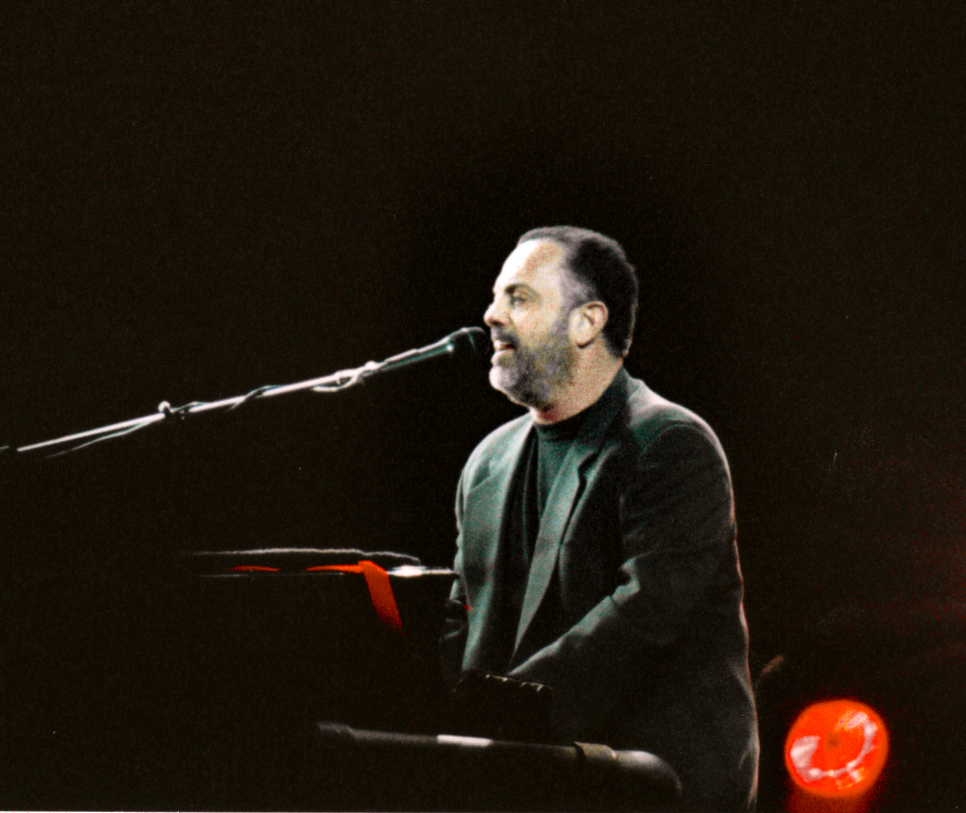
"Love It If We Made It" received numerous comparisons to Billy Joel, specifically his 1989 song "We Didn't Start the Fire".

Conrad Duncan of Under the Radar called the opening line "jaw-dropping", commenting that "Love It If We Made It" is "an exhilarating '80s pop stomp". Ian Cohen of Spin called the song an "online-addled reboot" of "We Didn't Start the Fire", while Mikael Wood of the Los Angeles Times called it an updated version of "We Didn't Start the Fire" mixed with the programmed strings of Carly Rae Jepsen. Sputnikmusic's SowingSeason said "Love It If We Made It" was executed "extremely well", comparing it to an updated, better-written version of the band's "Somebody Else" (2016). Juan Rodriguez of No Ripcord called the song "positively brilliant" and multidimensional. He noted it blends protest music akin to the "spitfire imagery" of "We Didn't Start the Fire" with the sophisticated balladry and "stylish charm" of Prefab Sprout. Matt Collar of AllMusic called "Love It If We Made It" a "buoyantly earnest anthem" and internet-era version of "We Didn't Start the Fire", Van Halen's "Right Now" (1992) and Phil Collins' "Another Day in Paradise" (1989). Ben Beaumont-Thomas and Laura Snapes of The Guardian called it the millennial version of "We Didn't Start the Fire" and "Sign O' the Times", praising Healy's numbed, intense vocal delivery and the incorporation of faith and empathy. They also deemed the couplet "I'd love it if we made it" one of 2018's "simplest yet most affecting lyrics". Iverson praised Healy's vocal performance as the best of the 2010s, saying "Love It If We Made It" was essentially a miniaturized version of the decade expressed in a "danceable, four-minute package" serving as a testament to the singer's ability as a frontman.

=== Accolades ===
Critical rankings for "Love It If We Made It"
Critic/Organization	Time span	Rank	Year published
B-Sides	Decade-end	11	2019
Bozeman Daily Chronicle	Decade-end	9	2019
Cleveland Magazine	21st Century	18	2019
Consequence of Sound	Year-end	18	2018
Consequence of Sound	Decade-end	56	2019
Consequence of Sound	Decade-end (Rock)	18	2019
The Daily Nebraskan	Year-end	1	2019
Chris DeVille (Stereogum)	Year-end	2	2018
Esquire	Year-end	N/A	2018
Esquire	Year-end (Pop)	N/A	2018
The Fader	Year-end	43	2018
Genius	Year-end	32	2018
The Guardian	Year-end	10	2018
Highsnobiety	Year-end	34	2018
Insider	Decade-end	42	2019
Sarah Jamieson (DIY)	Year-end	1	2018
JOE	Year-end	1	2018
Ryan Leas (Stereogum)	Year-end	3	2018
The Line of Best Fit	Year-end	2	2018
Newsday	Year-end	9	2018
The New York Times	Year-end	1	2018
NME	Year-end	2	2018
NME	Decade-end	4	2019
NPR	Year-end	9	2018
Paste	Year-end	48	2018
Pitchfork	Year-end	1	2018
Pitchfork	Decade-end	16	2019
Refinery29	Decade-end	N/A	2019
The Ringer	Year-end	1	2018
Rolling Stone	Year-end	20	2018
Rolling Stone	Decade-end	98	2019
Spin	Year-end	40	2018
Stereogum	Decade-end	22	2019
Tampa Bay Times	Year-end	12	2018
Tampa Bay Times	Decade-end	39	2019
Thrillist	Year-end	9	2018
Uproxx	Year-end	5	2018
Uproxx	Decade-end	51	2019
Vulture	Year-end	8	2018

== Commercial performance ==
In the 1975's native United Kingdom, "Love It If We Made It" debuted and peaked at number 33 on the UK Singles Chart. In Scotland, the song reached number 47. It was later certified silver by the British Phonographic Industry (BPI), denoting sales of over 200,000 units. Elsewhere in Europe, the song peaked at number 35 in Ireland. In the United States, "Love It If We Made It" reached number 10 on the US Billboard Hot Rock & Alternative Songs chart, later ranking at numbers 86 and 47 on the chart's year-end edition for 2018 and 2019, respectively. Additionally, it reached number 9 on the US Billboard Rock Airplay and number 36 on the chart's 2019 year-end edition. Elsewhere, "Love It If We Made It" peaked at number 46 on the Billboard Canada Rock Songs chart.

== Music video ==
=== Background and release ===
In July 2018, the 1975 invited fans to apply to be featured in an upcoming music video being filmed in London. On 22 July, Healy tweeted: "I just spent the whole day shooting a video with our fans and I just want to say that I couldn't be more proud. You are all so weird and beautiful. It was one of the best days of my life, thank you". Two music videos were released in support of "Love It If We Made It". The first, a vertical video, was released on 12 August 2018 on Spotify following a brief teaser posted on the 1975's Instagram. It depicts the band members performing the song as neon-coloured silhouettes and contains bright, multicoloured lighting, while lyrics from the song are shown at the top of the frame. A second, full-length video was released on 15 October 2018. It was directed by Adam Powell, with lighting and conceptual design by Tobias Rylander. The visual expands upon the vertical version and features the same silhouette footage against coloured backdrops, interspersed with found footage-style clips of war, selfies, news headlines, heroes, villains, affected youth, calamities and social woes.

=== Synopsis ===
The video, edited to appear glitchy, warped and poorly buffered, opens with a plastic bag silently floating through the sea. As the song begins, an image of Yiannopoulos flashes alongside lyrics, "Saying controversial things just for the hell of it". Clips of Americans fighting each other at a Black Friday sale are shown while Healy sings about white people's idolisation of melanin. This is immediately followed by footage captured on a cellphone showing Eric Gardner's death at the hands of the New York City Police Department. At the 43-second mark, lyrics referencing the increasing privatisation of the prison system are juxtaposed against footage of hooded individuals in orange jumpsuits. As the singer remarks on the veracity of truth, footage from the Westboro Baptist Church–a Christian extremist group–briefly flashes on the screen. Next, Harvey Weinstein's image is displayed as Healy ruminates on the failures of the modern era, which Connick interpreted to be a reference to the Me Too movement.

As the second verse begins, Healy takes a selfie against a billboard reading "Poison me daddy", referencing the song's promotional campaign, before displaying a video from the 2011 London riots. Next, as the singer describes a scene of drowned children on a beach, images of Alan Kurdi are shown before shifting to a billboard reading "Rest in Peace Lil Peep". Elsewhere, footage of the Grenfell tower fire is interspersed. A dance breakdown is performed during the second chorus recreating the dance scene from Michael Jackson's "The Way You Make Me Feel" (1987) music video, which the Dork editorial staff described as post-apocalyptic. A multicultural montage of faces is shown after the breakdown, filmed during the band's video for "TooTimeTooTimeTooTime".

In the bridge, lyrics referring to liberals and immigration are intercut with clips of Brett Kavanaugh. Then, a picture of Trump is shown alongside the lyrics "I moved on her like a bitch", followed by anti-Trump protesters calling for his impeachment. Next, the line "Thank you Kanye, very cool!" incorporates footage of West, while references to war are interspersed with clips from the September 11 attacks. As the video concludes, close up images of the 1975's fans are shown in rapid succession, with the last being a shot of Healy, ending with a "slide to power off" message from an iPhone screen. The end credits feature a list of movements and organizations including Me Too, Black Lives Matter, UNICEF, Save the Children and It Gets Better, alongside a quote reading: "If I don't get to see the beauty of the end of culture / Then at least I've seen the culture of the end of reality."

=== Reception ===
Connick deemed the video a "state of the union address for a fractured planet", calling it gripping and effortlessly stylish, noting it moves at an "incessant, scatter-brained pace". Brooke Bajgrowicz of Billboard wrote that the visual's commentary on social issues and images were juxtaposed by the uplifting sound of "Love It If We Made It", highlighting the use of diverse faces to serve as "a reminder that the people affected by the world's mess are simply human, regardless of race, gender or ethnicity". Bajgrowicz also observed a political undertone in the video toward the end, represented by the footage of Trump, Kavanaugh and West, commenting that it references the former president's "creation of literal and metaphorical war". Patrick Hosken of MTV News commended the "dazzling" and "staggeringly beautiful" video, specifically praising the synchronized dance sequence as "incredible" and writing that it serves to physicalize the song's angst. Similarly, Dylan Haas of Euphoria Magazine also highlighted the dance sequence and compared it to Jackson. "Love It If We Made It" later received a nomination for Best Rock Video at the 2019 UK Music Video Awards and Best Rock Video at the 2019 MTV Video Music Awards.

=== Twitter controversy ===
In May 2020, following the Murder of George Floyd, Healy tweeted in support of the Black Lives Matter movement condemning those tweeting All Lives Matter: "If you truly believe that ‘ALL LIVES MATTER’ you need to stop facilitating the end of black ones". In the same tweet he included a link to the 'Love It If We Made It' music video, on account of its relevant lyrical content towards racism and police brutality, which resulted to users accusing him of using the Black Lives Matter movement as an excuse to promote his music. Healy deleted the tweet and responded to the backlash in a subsequent tweet before deleting his account: “Sorry I did not link my song in that tweet to make it about me it’s just that the song is literally about this disgusting situation and speaks more eloquently than I can on Twitter". Reflecting on the backlash two years later in 2022, Healy stated: "By that point, my reaction in the room to all that Twitter shit was like, ‘Oh fuck off! You know that I’m not using this as an opportunity to monetise the half-a-pence I get paid for a fucking YouTube play’. What I’m saying is, ‘Here’s something I’ve really thought about’, and all you’ve been asking for four days is ‘Say something about it!’ So I said, ‘Here’s what I think’". Healy argued that a song is more considered than a tweet, self-proclaiming himself as “the best writer in music on consumption within the internet”.

== Credits and personnel ==
Credits adapted from A Brief Inquiry into Online Relationships album liner notes.

- Matthew Healy – composer, producer, keyboards, guitar, vocals
- George Daniel – composer, producer, programming, drums, synthesizer
- Adam Hann – composer, guitar
- Ross MacDonald – composer, bass guitar
- London Community Gospel Choir – choir vocals
- Jonathan Gilmore – recording engineer
- Robin Schmidt – mastering engineer
- Mike Crossey – mixer

== Charts ==
=== Weekly charts ===
Chart performance for "Love It If We Made It"
Chart (2018)	Peak position
Canada Rock (Billboard)	46
Ireland (IRMA)	35
Scottish Singles Sales (Official Charts)	47
UK Singles (Official Charts)	33
US Hot Rock & Alternative Songs (Billboard)	10
US Rock & Alternative Airplay (Billboard)	9

=== Year-end charts ===
2018 year-end chart performance for "Love It If We Made It"
Chart (2018)	Position
US Hot Rock & Alternative Songs (Billboard)	86

2019 year-end chart performance for "Love It If We Made It"
Chart (2019)	Position
US Hot Rock & Alternative (Billboard)	47
US Rock Airplay (Billboard)	36

== Certifications ==
Certifications and sales for "Love It If We Made It"
Region	Certification	Certified units/sales
Brazil (Pro-Música Brasil)	Gold	20,000^{‡}
United Kingdom (BPI)	Platinum	600,000^{‡}
United States (RIAA)	Gold	500,000^{‡}
^{‡} Sales+streaming figures based on certification alone.

== Release history ==
Release dates and formats for "Love It If We Made It"
Region	Date	Format	Label	Ref.
Various	19 July 2018	Streaming	Dirty Hit	
Australia	21 July 2018	Digital download	Dirty Hit	
New Zealand	21 July 2018	Digital download	Dirty Hit	

== See also ==
- The 1975 discography
- List of songs by Matty Healy
