= Hats (album) =

Studio album by the Blue Nile
- Released: 9 October 1989
- Recorded: 1984–1989
- Studios: Castlesound Studios, Pencaitland, East Lothian, Scotland
- Genres: Sophisti-pop; art pop; electropop; synth-pop
- Length: 38:26
- Labels: Linn; A&M
- Producer: The Blue Nile

The Blue Nile chronology
A Walk Across the Rooftops (1984)	Hats (1989)	Peace at Last (1996)

Singles from Hats
- 1. "The Downtown Lights" Released: 18 September 1989; 2. "Headlights on the Parade" Released: 10 September 1990; 3. "Saturday Night" Released: 14 January 1991

Audio sample
- "The Downtown Lights": file; help

Hats is the second studio album by Scottish band the Blue Nile, originally released on 9 October 1989 on Linn Records and A&M Records.

After a prolonged delay in which an entire album's worth of work was scrapped, the Blue Nile released Hats to rave reviews, including a rare five-star rating from Q magazine. It also became the band's most successful album, reaching number 12 on the UK albums chart and spawning three singles: "The Downtown Lights", "Headlights on the Parade", and "Saturday Night".

== Recording ==
Having finished promotion work for their debut album A Walk Across the Rooftops, the group's record company Linn Records were keen to have a follow-up record, and in early 1985 sent the band to a house in the golfing resort town of Gullane near the Castlesound Studios where the previous album had been produced. However, sessions for the new record hit problems almost immediately. The band did not yet have enough material to make another album, and with the group forced to share a house and having to spend all their time in close proximity with each other, arguments developed among the homesick band members. Exhausted and stressed, their problems were compounded when Virgin Records, to whom Linn had licensed the Blue Nile's records, began legal proceedings against Linn Records, demanding new material. "We were up against the wall," singer Paul Buchanan told Uncut magazine in 2013. "Living away from home, no money, miserable, getting sued. We were absolutely zonked, the record company weren't pleased and everyone around was starting to think, this record is never going to get made. It was exhausting."

After almost three years in the studio which produced virtually nothing, having begun and scrapped several songs, the group was forced to vacate Castlesound to make way for It's Immaterial, another Virgin band, to record their second album Song. Like the Blue Nile, It's Immaterial also ran into difficulties making their record, overrunning their allotted time and eventually spending a year at Castlesound. During this time, the Blue Nile had no option but to return home to Glasgow; back in familiar surroundings and freed from time constraints, Buchanan overcame his writer's block, while Robert Bell and Paul Joseph Moore began putting musical ideas down on a portastudio. As a result, when the band was finally able to return to Castlesound in 1988, the ideas for the album were already in place and according to Buchanan, "we knew exactly what we were doing. We actually recorded the rest of Hats super quick ... Honestly, half of Hats was, like, a week."

In a 2012 interview with ClashMusic.com, Buchanan reflected on the time lost trying to make the album:

"We pretty much put the record [A Walk Across the Rooftops] out, promoted it and then the next thing we knew we were back in the studio. That whole gestation period had gone missing. We didn't really have the songs. We laboured away in the studio trying to generate the material there, which just didn't work. We recorded but we just didn't believe in what we'd recorded ... I think people perceived it as it was all to do with us sort of being in the studio for five years, but of course you couldn't be in the studio for five years, you'd lose your mind. There was a two year period where we would have gone back in but we couldn't get back in! So when we got back we actually finished Hats quickly. The period when we got bumped out the studio we had nothing else to do, so we packed up and went home. Which is what we should have done in the first place, because when we went back home we reverted to our old routines—practise, play and sit about each other's little flats and talk things through. We should have done that to begin with, really."

== Release ==
Hats was released in October 1989 simultaneously in both the United Kingdom and the United States: since the Blue Nile was essentially unknown in the US in 1989, the cover artwork for the US release of the album was slightly modified for marketing reasons, with the band's name in larger letters. As a promotional tool, A&M Records—who distributed Hats in North America—took out a full-page advertisement in Billboard magazine offering a free copy of the CD to anyone who called a toll-free number which was provided.

Hats peaked at number 12 on the UK Albums Chart. Three singles were released from the album: the first, "The Downtown Lights", was released in September 1989 and peaked at number 67 on the UK Singles Chart, followed by "Headlights on the Parade" in September 1990 which reached number 72, and "Saturday Night" in January 1991, which reached number 50.

In the US, Hats peaked at number 108 on the Billboard 200. "The Downtown Lights" reached number 10 on the Billboard Hot Modern Rock Tracks chart in early 1990, becoming the group's only single chart entry in that country.

In November 2012 Virgin Records released two-CD "Collector's Edition" versions of Hats and its predecessor A Walk Across the Rooftops in the UK and Europe, each containing a remastered version of the original album plus a second CD of bonus tracks. The remastering process was overseen by original engineer Calum Malcolm, along with Paul Buchanan and Robert Bell, who chose the songs for the bonus CD.

== Critical reception ==
Professional ratings
Review scores
Source	Rating
AllMusic	4.5/5 stars
Chicago Tribune	3.5/4 stars
Mojo	5/5 stars
NME	9/10
Pitchfork	8.8/10
Q	5/5 stars
Record Mirror	4/5
Rolling Stone	3/5 stars
Sounds	4/5 stars
Uncut	10/10

On its initial release in 1989, Hats received highly positive reviews from music critics. Describing the album as "absolutely superb", David Cavanagh of Sounds found that Hats differed significantly from A Walk Across the Rooftops in both its recording technology and aspired moods. Johnny Black of Q noted the more stripped-down nature of the album's songs and praised the band's new direction, stating that "if Hats has a flaw, it's only that it's too perfect, too considered." NME's David Quantick felt that the album demonstrated the band's flair for writing "incredibly simple-sounding, emotional records about the stuff that fascinates them." Simon Reynolds, writing in Melody Maker, stated that "only the laziest ear would confuse this crystalline perfection with the hygiene and polish of plastic pop" and described the album as "big music, that leaves you feeling very small, very still and very close to tears." In a more lukewarm assessment, David Thigpen of Rolling Stone complimented the band's use of instrumentation to convey emotions, but felt that Paul Buchanan's singing range was limited and the album occasionally veers "into sticky melancholy."

In a retrospective review of Hats, Jason Ankeny of AllMusic praised the album as "a triumph of personal vision over the cold, remote calculations of technology" and stated that in spite of general lack of live instrumentation, "it is nevertheless an immensely warm and human album." Following the release of the album's 2012 remastered version, D. M. Edwards of PopMatters wrote that Hats sounded "richer, fuller, more layered and produced" than A Walk Across the Rooftops and provided a "pretty unrelenting opportunity to really wallow in gorgeous, sublime, melancholy." Reviewing the remastered versions of both albums in Mojo, James McNair cited them as "superior, elegant examples of masterful craftmanship", noting elements of soul and classical minimalism in the albums' "electro-acoustic mood pieces", and described them as "exquisite music for the small hours in which little is said but much is revealed".

=== Accolades ===
Hats featured strongly on the end of year critics' lists, making number eight on Melody Maker's albums of the year list, and number 18 on NME's list. "The Downtown Lights" was also placed at number 15 on Melody Maker's singles of the year list.

Hats was voted number 345 in the third edition of Colin Larkin's All Time Top 1000 Albums (2000). Q placed Hats at number 92 on its list of the "100 Greatest British Albums Ever" in 2000 and at number 38 on its list of "40 Best Albums of the '80s" in 2006.

== Legacy ==
Rickie Lee Jones, a fan of the band, personally selected the Blue Nile as her opening act for her US tour in 1990. She later recorded a duet with them, a cover of their own "Easter Parade" from A Walk Across the Rooftops, which was featured as a B-side to the single "Headlights on the Parade". "The Downtown Lights" was covered by two artists in 1995: by Annie Lennox (with whom The Blue Nile worked on her debut album Diva) on her second solo recording Medusa and by Rod Stewart on his album A Spanner in the Works. In 2018, Pure Bathing Culture released a cover of the entire album, as part of Turntable Kitchen's Sounds Delicious series of artists covering their favourite albums in full.

In 2016, the 1975's lead singer Matty Healy stated that Hats was his favorite album of the 1980s. Healy cited Hats as an influence on the band's 2018 single "Love It If We Made It". In 2024, in the opening and closing lyrics to her song "Guilty as Sin" from the album The Tortured Poets Department, Taylor Swift included a reference to a person sending her "The Downtown Lights" to listen to. Swift had previously had a relationship with Healy.

Black Midi lead singer Geordie Greep named Hats one of his ten favorite albums of all time.

== Track listing ==
All songs written and composed by Paul Buchanan.

Side A
No.	Title	Length
1.	"Over the Hillside"	5:03
2.	"The Downtown Lights"	6:26
3.	"Let's Go Out Tonight"	5:12

Side B
No.	Title	Length
1.	"Headlights on the Parade"	6:11
2.	"From a Late Night Train"	3:59
3.	"Seven A.M."	5:09
4.	"Saturday Night"	6:26

2012 remastered edition bonus disc
No.	Title	Length
1.	"Seven A.M." (Live in the studio)	4:48
2.	"Christmas"	5:05
3.	"Let's Go Out Tonight" (Vocal 2)	5:17
4.	"Saturday Night" (Vocal 2, early mix)	6:06
5.	"Headlights on the Parade" (Live in Tennessee with Larry Saltzman, Steve Gaboury and Nigel Thomas)	6:20
6.	"The Wires Are Down"	5:41

== Personnel ==
Credits are adapted from the liner notes for Hats.

The Blue Nile

- Robert Bell – bass, synthesizers
- Paul Buchanan – guitar, synthesizers, vocals
- Paul Joseph Moore – keyboards, synthesizers
- The Blue Nile – production

Additional personnel

- Calum Malcolm – engineering

== Release history ==
Region	Date	Label	Format	Catalog
United Kingdom and Europe	16 October 1989	Linn Records	LP	LKH2
United Kingdom and Europe	16 October 1989	Linn Records	cassette	LKHC2
United Kingdom and Europe	16 October 1989	Linn Records	CD	LKHCD2
United States	16 October 1989	A&M Records	LP	SP-5284
United States	16 October 1989	A&M Records	cassette	CS-5284
United States	16 October 1989	A&M Records	CD	CD 5284
United Kingdom	19 November 2012	Virgin Records	Remastered 2CD collector's edition	LKHCDR 2
Europe	19 November 2012	Virgin Records	Remastered 2CD collector's edition	5099901730029
United Kingdom	20 January 2013	Virgin Records	180-gram vinyl	LKHR 2
United Kingdom, Europe & United States	1 March 2019	Confetti Records	Remastered 2CD collector's edition (same content as 2012 reissue)	BLUECD2/5052442014942
