= Pure Bathing Culture =

American indie pop band

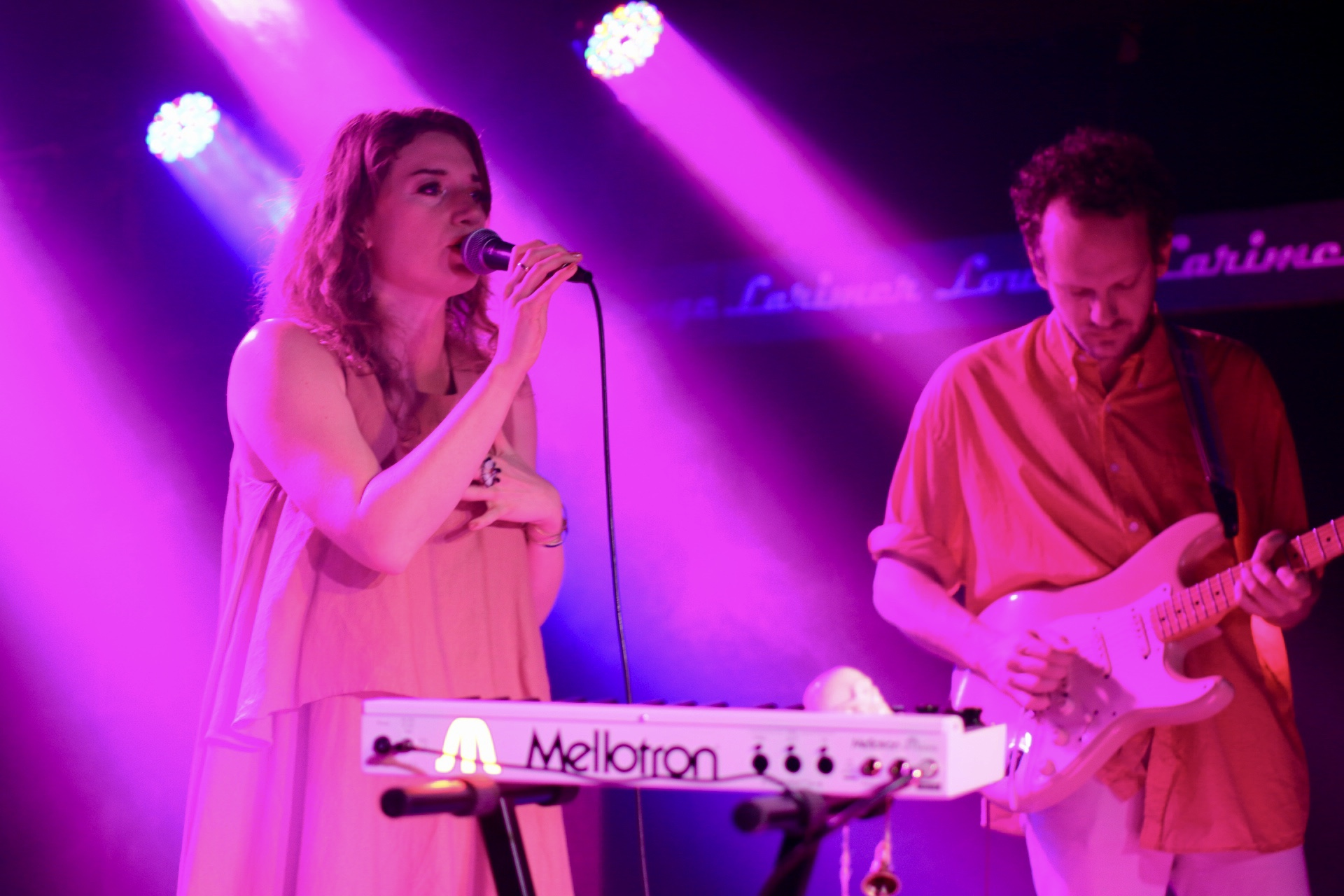
- Pure Bathing Culture performing in 2019

Background information
- Origin: Portland, Oregon, U.S.
- Genres: Dream pop, shoegaze, indie pop
- Years active: 2012–present
- Spinoff of: Vetiver
- Members: Sarah Versprille; Daniel Hindman
- Past members: Brian Wright
- Website: www.purebathingculture.com

Pure Bathing Culture is an American indie pop band from Portland, Oregon, United States.

== Career ==
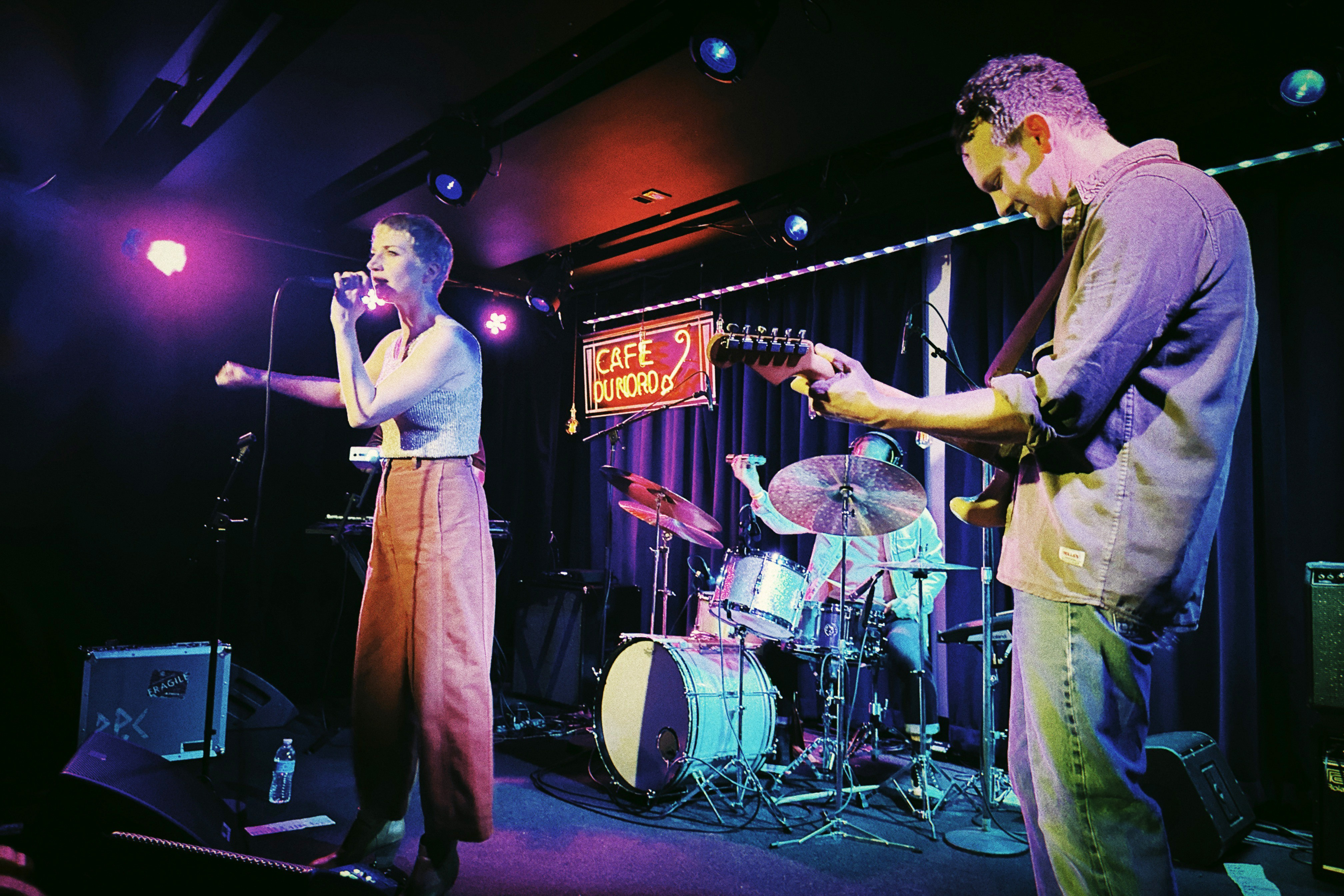
Pure Bathing Culture performing at Cafe Du Nord San Francisco - February 9, 2024

The group's members, Sarah Versprille and Daniel Hindman, first met while college students in New Jersey. They lived in Brooklyn, New York and both moved to Portland, Oregon in 2011, playing in the group Vetiver. Around 2012 they began playing live shows, and released a self-titled EP produced by Richard Swift in 2012 on Father/Daughter Records. The band toured in the US opening for Caveman and Father John Misty.

The band released its first album on Partisan Records in 2013. The album was highlighted by the single, "Pendulum", which some critics likened in style to Fleetwood Mac. One of the tracks, "Scotty", drew its lyrics and melody in part from the 1980 hit single "Into the Night" by Benny Mardones. Touring for this release included a full US tour opening for Widowspeak, followed by a co-headline tour with La Luz and another full US tour opening for Tennis in the fall of 2014.

The band recorded their second album, Pray for Rain, with producer John Congleton in February 2015 in Dallas, Texas. They released it on Partisan Records on October 23, 2015. The Guardian said: "And it's their strength with melodies that will keep listeners coming back...they prove they have a sparklingly sure touch for the purest kind of guitar pop, with a song whose arpeggiated guitar line is a smile set to music." This release was followed by a country-wide headlining tour as well as a headlining tour in the UK with sold-out shows in Manchester and London. More touring in the US followed in 2016 including opening slots for Lucius, Chvrches, and Death Cab For Cutie.

In 2017, the band toured opening for Death Cab For Cutie and The Shins and began work on their third album with producer Tucker Martine.

On April 26, 2019, the band released Night Pass on the new indie record label, Infinite Companion. Produced by Tucker Martine, recorded at Flora Recording and Playback in their hometown, Portland, Oregon, Night Pass is a record about perseverance and the lasting strength of love. Pitchfork said, "Pure Bathing Culture juxtapose the highs with the lows, packaging distress as euphoria. The album does its most interesting work on songs like 'Moonrise' and 'Thin Growing Thing,' where Versprille wails, 'Do you want to take it higher?,' as if in homage to Steve Winwood's 1986 hit 'Higher Love.' At its best, Night Pass flaunts the sounds that might have embarrassed you in your dad's station wagon: the noodly electrified riffs of Fleetwood Mac's Tango in the Night or the earnest soulfulness of Peter Gabriel's So." The band toured with Lucius and American Football in support of the record later that year.

On July 3, 2020, the band released the Carrido, an EP created in honor of Richard Swift.

"Dream the Dare" from the band's album Moon Tides was featured on the NBA2K21 Current Generation Soundtrack.

In 2023, the band self-released their fifth album Chalice. In February 2024, they launched a West Coast tour, including stops in Seattle, Portland, San Francisco, Los Angeles, and San Diego. The shows were opened by Meernaa.

== Members ==
- Sarah Versprille – keyboards, vocals
- Daniel Hindman – guitar, bass, keyboards

Touring personnel

- Zach Tillman – bass, keyboards
- Justin Chase – keyboards
- Christopher Icasiano – drums

Past Members

- Brian Wright – drums

== Discography ==
=== Albums ===
- Moon Tides (Partisan Records, 2013)
- Pray for Rain (Partisan Records, 2015)
- Hats (Turntable Kitchen, 2018) (cover Album of The Blue Nile's Hats)
- Night Pass (Infinite Companion, 2019)
- Chalice (Self-released, 2023)

=== EP ===
- Pure Bathing Culture (Father/Daughter Records/Memphis Industries, 2012)
- Equinox (Acoustic) (Infinite Companion, 2019)
- Carrido (Infinite Companion, 2020)
- Roxi's Dream, Pt. 1 (Pure Bathing Culture, 2023)

=== Singles ===
- Pendulum (Infinite Companion, 2019)
- Dreams (Infinite Companion, 2020) (Fleetwood Mac cover)
- 2000 Miles (Pure Bathing Culture, 2022) (The Pretenders cover)
