= Maeve O'Boyle =

- Born: 6 October 1987 (age 38); Glasgow, Scotland
- Occupation: Singer-songwriter
- Instruments: Guitar, vocals
- Website: www.maeveoboyle.co.uk

Maeve O'Boyle (born 6 October 1987, Glasgow) is a Scottish singer-songwriter who is known for her voice and her songs and stories.

O'Boyle's Career began at the age of 16 as a top-line lyricist and melody writer for various pop acts. By the age of 21 O'Boyle had secured her own record contract with Linn Records releasing two studio albums and three EPs to date.

Maeve regularly performed solo sets in addition to touring extensively with her band which frequently featured prominent Scottish session and recording musicians.

In 2015 O'Boyle left the following message on Facebook,"Its been wonderful, Lets leave this paradise". Fans interpretations have differed but speculation is that O'Boyle has retired from live performance.

== Charity work ==
In January 2008, O'Boyle founded the M.I.M.A project (music industry made accessible) a music program and school based in Glasgow, dedicated to supporting young people from disadvantaged backgrounds.

== Notable performances ==
O'Boyle was invited to perform at the White House in Washington, D.C., on 12 December 2012 after a member of the White House staff saw the video for her song "Brothers In Arms" on YouTube. She was the first woman from Scotland to perform at The White House.

O'Boyle was asked to perform at Bellahouston Park in Glasgow on 16 September 2010 for Pope Benedict XVI where he was performing an open-air mass for 100,000 people. Also performing that day was Susan Boyle.

O’Boyle performed with her band at Glasgow's ABC, recording for Channel 4's ‘The Jack Daniels’ set.

== Discography ==
- All My Sins (2009)
- Intermission (2011)
- An A' That (The Robert Burns Session) (2013) *Reached Number 7 in the Swedish iTunes chart*
- Being Patient (2013)
- Tomorrow EP (2015)
