= Saturday Night (The Blue Nile song) =

Single by The Blue Nile

from the album Hats
- B-side: "Our Lives (Lost / Bolivia / New York)"; "Seven A.M." (live)
- Released: 7 January 1991
- Genre: Blue-eyed soul; pop
- Length: 6:18 (album version); 4:01 (single version)
- Label: Linn
- Songwriter(s): Paul Buchanan
- Producer(s): The Blue Nile

The Blue Nile singles chronology
"Headlights on the Parade" (1990)	"Saturday Night" (1991)	"Happiness" (1996)

Audio sample
- file; help

"Saturday Night" is a song by Scottish band The Blue Nile, released in 1991 as the third and final single from their second studio album Hats (1989). It was written by Paul Buchanan and produced by the band. "Saturday Night" reached number 50 in the UK Singles Chart and remained in the top 100 for three weeks. It remains the band's highest charting single in the UK.

== Background ==
"Saturday Night" was released as a single after it became a "live favourite" on the band's critically-acclaimed 1990 UK tour. It was intended to release the song as a single in 1990, with Music & Media reporting in January 1990 that the band were due to remix the song with Bob Clearmountain. A remixed version of "Headlights on the Parade" was released as the second single from Hats instead.

== Critical reception ==
On its release as a single, Chris Roberts of Melody Maker picked "Saturday Night" as one of the magazine's "singles of the week". He described it as "a great love song" and added, "It's so tactile you could stroke it, so gentle you could breathe it, so perfectly understated you could fail to appreciate its beauty if you were 99 per cent of the British population." Simon Williams of New Musical Express considered it to be "a gentle, synthetic respite" which "goes voyeuring through the twilight zone, exposing the empty hours for the burden they really are". He noted the song "sounds vacuous and tepid in the hustle and bustle of early evening", but added that it "attains breathtaking significance at dawn". Robin Smith of Record Mirror was negative in his review, remarking, "This sounds like a Sunday morning hangover. The Blue Nile are capable of creating great songs but also excel in mind-numbing over-indulgence, and 'Saturday Night' does half drone on and on. Dear me."

In a review of Hats, David Thigpen of Rolling Stone commented, "Songs such as 'The Downtown Lights' and 'Saturday Night' have a sparse, soulful feel that blends the cool, nocturnal languor of Bryan Ferry with the mystical hues of Peter Gabriel." In a 1996 retrospective on The Blue Nile, George Byrne of the Irish Independent wrote, "When Buchanan sings about 'an ordinary girl' ('Saturday Night'), he makes her sound like the most important woman on earth, and that's the essence of The Blue Nile."

== Cover versions ==
In 1996, Irish singer-songwriter Leslie Dowdall released a version of the song as a track on her debut album No Guilt No Guile. In 2001, she told Hot Press, "I think we did a damn fine version of 'Saturday Night' and I don't care if Paul Buchanan hates it! There's a lovely feel to it, which is like the feel I wanted for the album."

== Track listing ==
7" and cassette single

1. "Saturday Night" (Edit) – 4:01
2. "Saturday Night" (Album Version) – 6:18

12" single

1. "Saturday Night" (Edit) – 4:01
2. "Saturday Night" (Album Version) – 6:18
3. "Our Lives (Lost / Bolivia / New York)" – 7:15

CD single

1. "Saturday Night" (Edit) – 4:01
2. "Seven A.M." (Live, U.S.A.) – 5:33
3. "Saturday Night" (Album Version) – 6:18

CD single

1. "Saturday Night" (Edit) – 4:01
2. "Our Lives (Lost / Bolivia / New York)" – 7:15
3. "Saturday Night" – 6:18

== Personnel ==
The Blue Nile

- Paul Buchanan
- Robert Bell
- Paul Joseph Moore

Production

- The Blue Nile – producers
- Calum Malcolm – recording

Other

- The Blue Nile – sleeve design
- Stylorouge – artwork
- Jeanloup Sieff – original photography "Paris La Nuit" (1956)

== Charts ==
Chart (1991)	Peak position
UK Singles (OCC)	50
