= Carol Kidd =

Scottish jazz singer

- Born: Carol Delaney; 19 October 1945 (age 80)
- Origin: Shettleston, Glasgow, Scotland
- Genres: Jazz
- Occupation: Vocalist
- Years active: 1961–present
- Labels: ALOI, Linn

Carol Kidd MBE (born 19 October 1945) is a Scottish jazz singer.

Kidd was born in Glasgow, Scotland. She came to prominence in the mid-1970s, as the vocalist in the band led by vibraphonist / saxophonist Jimmy Feighan. In 1990, she released her award-winning album The Night We Called It a Day. She has subsequently performed and recorded extensively on her own. She has won several awards at the British Jazz Awards. In 1998, she was appointed an MBE.

== Discography ==
- Carol Kidd (Aloi, 1984)
- All My Tomorrows (Aloi, 1985)
- Nice Work (Linn, 1987)
- The Night We Called It a Day (Linn, 1990)
- I'm Glad We Met (Linn, 1991)
- Crazy for Gershwin (Linn, 1994)
- That's Me (Linn, 1995)
- A Singer for All Seasons (Jazz Arena, 1998)
- A Place in My Heart (Jazz Arena, 1999)
- Debut (Linn, 1984 - remastered 2004)
- Dreamsville (Linn, 2008)
- Tell Me Once Again (Linn, 2010)
- Auld Lang Syne (Aurora Music, 2015)
