= High (The Blue Nile album) =

Studio album by The Blue Nile
- Released: 30 August 2004
- Recorded: 1997–2004 various studios, Glasgow, Scotland
- Length: 40:49
- Label: Sanctuary
- Producer: The Blue Nile

The Blue Nile chronology
Peace at Last (1996)	High (2004)

Singles from High
- 1. "I Would Never" Released: 23 August 2004

High is the fourth and final studio album by Scottish band The Blue Nile, released on 30 August 2004 on Sanctuary Records. A single, "I Would Never", was released one week prior to the album: a second song, "She Saw the World", was made available as a promotional single, but never released officially.

Versions of "Soul Boy" had already been released by Edyta Górniak in 1997 on her self-titled second album and by former Spice Girl Melanie C on her 2003 album Reason.

== Critical reception ==
Professional ratings
Review scores
Source	Rating
AllMusic	3.5/5 stars
Blender	4/5 stars
Entertainment Weekly	A
The Guardian	4/5 stars
Mojo	4/5 stars
The Observer	4/5 stars
Stylus Magazine	C+
Uncut	8/10

The album received generally favourable reviews, with many critics considering High to be a stronger album than their previous effort Peace at Last. AllMusic said "the Blue Nile have returned with a more balanced album [than Peace at Last] and Buchanan is broken-hearted again, thank the stars. He's been struggling with fatigue and illness and as selfish and inconsiderate as it sounds, it's brought the spark back to his writing ... given the time to sink in, the album fits well in their canon." The Guardian believed that with High "the emotional commitment of Peace at Last is combined with the observational detachment of the earlier work ... In pop, most people do their best work within five or six years. How extraordinary, then, that after more than two decades of activity, the Blue Nile remain on course, their range expanded, their focus more refined, unshaken in their determination to proceed at their own measured pace."

MusicOMH said "High is proof that they may have been away for a while, but they certainly haven't lost their touch ... Although some may call this album bland, that is to miss the point ... Buchanan's vocals are what raises most of the songs to another level—sometimes a gentle whisper, at other times an anguished cry, it's one of the great, if less celebrated voices in modern music. They may only appear at around the same frequency as Halley's Comet but it's records like High that remind you why The Blue Nile are so highly regarded." BBC Music said "High manages to maintain the Blue Nile's impeccably tasteful standards while soaring blissfully over the rattle and hum of most contemporary music. Paul Buchanan still sings his songs of faded love affairs, broken dreams and squandered ambitions with almost painful emotional candor, while the musical backings are as lush and flowing as ever ... There are many recognizable Blue Nile motifs throughout—the imagery of rain, railway stations, traffic and rooftops will certainly be familiar—and the tempo barely rises above a stately shuffle, which for some might seem a missed opportunity for stylistic innovation. However, for those of us who've cherished the band's previous albums, High is like meeting a new friend, albeit one possessing a reassuring familiarity."

Other reviewers were less enthusiastic: Stylus Magazine said, "If you were hoping for something to stand above Hats as a late-night, solitary classic, then High will only get halfway there, because it sounds exactly as you would expect a fourth Blue Nile album to sound. Perhaps their best music has long since been made, but The Blue Nile still do what they do exquisitely well." The Observer was disappointed, writing, "the empty streets of provincial towns are the stock-in-trade landscapes of the Blue Nile, and it's one of the saddening facts about High that those landscapes have become a little predictable", while Uncut said that "Paul Buchanan revisits the same spot on the hillside overlooking the evening city lights, is still filled with the same surging, oblique melancholy and longing that has sustained The Blue Nile since 1984, is still crafting singularly mature MOR in a darker shade of turquoise all his own. This time, however, the overall return feels diminished in effect."

== Track listing ==
All songs written and composed by Paul Buchanan.

1. "The Days of Our Lives" – 3:32
2. "I Would Never" – 4:26
3. "Broken Loves" – 5:20
4. "Because of Toledo" – 3:53
5. "She Saw the World" – 3:36
6. "High" – 3:46
7. "Soul Boy" – 4:40
8. "Everybody Else" – 3:50
9. "Stay Close" – 7:46

=== 2020 Remastered Collector's Edition CD bonus disc ===
1. "Wasted" (Previously unreleased) – 5:52
2. "The Days of Our Lives" (Remix) – 5:13
3. "She Saw the World" (Remix) – 3:52
4. "I" (Previously unreleased) – 6:37
5. "Big Town" (Previously unreleased) – 5:51
6. "Here Come the Bluebirds" (Previously unreleased) – 4:51

== Personnel ==
The Blue Nile

- Robert Bell – bass, synthesizers
- Paul Buchanan – vocals, guitar, synthesizers
- Paul Joseph Moore – keyboards, synthesizers

Additional personnel

- Calum Malcolm – engineer

== Charts ==
When it was released in 2004, High became The Blue Nile's first Top 10 album on the Official Charts Company's UK countdown, peaking at number 10 on the chart of 11 September and lasting for three weeks inside the Top 75. In 2020, the album was re-issued by Confetti Records and charted as separate hit inside the Top 75 at number 74.

== Certifications ==
Region	Certification	Certified units/sales
United Kingdom (BPI)	Silver	60,000^{^}
^{^} Shipments figures based on certification alone.
