= The Blue Nile (band) =

Scottish band, 1981–2004

- The Blue Nile during the 1980s

Background information
- Origin: Glasgow, Scotland
- Genres: Sophisti-pop; synth-pop; art rock
- Years active: 1981–2004 (Note: Informal indefinite hiatus)
- Labels: RSO, Linn, Virgin, Warner Bros., Sanctuary
- Members: Paul Buchanan; Robert Bell
- Past members: Paul Joseph Moore
- Website: thebluenile.org

The Blue Nile were a Scottish band which originated in 1981 in Glasgow. The group's early music was built heavily on synthesizers and electronic instrumentation and percussion, although later works featured guitar more prominently. Following early championing by established artists such as Rickie Lee Jones and Peter Gabriel (the band later worked with both acts), the Blue Nile gained critical acclaim, particularly for their first two albums A Walk Across the Rooftops and Hats, and some commercial success in both the UK and the US, which led to the band working with a wide range of musicians from the late 1980s onwards.

The Blue Nile's highest chart placement came when "Tinseltown in the Rain" reached No. 28 in the Netherlands in 1984, their only Dutch charting song. The band has had four top 75 hits on the UK singles chart, the highest being "Saturday Night", which reached No. 50 in 1991. In the United States, "The Downtown Lights" was their only chart entry, peaking at No. 10 on Billboard's Alternative Songs chart. The band members have also gained a reputation for their avoidance of publicity, their idiosyncratic dealings with the recording industry, and their perfectionism and slow work rate, which has resulted in the release of just four albums since the group's formation in 1981.

In 1989, Record Mirror ranked A Walk Across the Rooftops at number 74 in its critics' list of the best albums of the 1980s. The Guardian included A Walk Across the Rooftops in their 2007 feature 1000 Albums to Hear Before You Die. The album was also included in the book 1001 Albums You Must Hear Before You Die. Their second album, Hats, featured strongly on the end of year critics' lists, making number eight on Melody Maker's albums of the year list, and number 18 on NME's list. It was also voted number 345 in the third edition of Colin Larkin's All Time Top 1000 Albums (2000). Q placed Hats at number 92 on its list of the "100 Greatest British Albums Ever" in 2000 and at number 38 on its list of "40 Best Albums of the '80s" in 2006.

== History ==
=== Early years ===
Paul Buchanan (born 16 April 1956, Edinburgh, Scotland) and his childhood friend Robert Bell grew up together in Glasgow. They both attended the University of Glasgow in the late 1970s, Buchanan gaining a degree in literature and medieval history, Bell a degree in mathematics. Buchanan's civil servant father had been a semi-professional musician and had musical instruments in the house, but it was only after he and Bell had graduated that Buchanan began to think seriously about a career in music.

Although Buchanan had grown up in the same neighbourhood as Paul Joseph "PJ" Moore, they only became well acquainted at university, where Moore was studying electronics, and the three friends became part of a band, first known as McIntyre (named after the John McIntyre Building, the university's administrative offices) and then Night by Night, although Buchanan later commented that Night by Night only played "twice, maybe three times" in its short existence. The band struggled to retain a settled line-up and, by 1981, Buchanan, Bell and Moore were the only remaining members. They decided not to recruit anybody else, trading in a guitar for an effect pedal and borrowing an old drum machine that only played Hispanic American music rhythms. Buchanan later recalled, "We went and gigged, because we needed the money, we'd do gigs where we'd do cover versions with the cassette of Latin American rhythms. And we were terrible. But we picked songs that were so completely durable and well known that people recognized them. No matter how badly we mangled them."

Renaming themselves the Blue Nile (after the title of the 1962 book by Alan Moorehead), the group managed to raise enough money to record and release its first single, "I Love This Life", on their own Peppermint Records label. Only a limited number were produced, but one found its way to RSO Records via their friend and engineer Calum Malcolm. Malcolm had been a member of short-lived Edinburgh punk band The Headboys who had released their records on the RSO label, and he still had contacts with the company. RSO licensed the single for distribution, but almost as soon as the record was released RSO went bankrupt and was absorbed into the PolyGram recording company, and the single consequently disappeared.

=== A Walk Across the Rooftops (1982–1984) ===
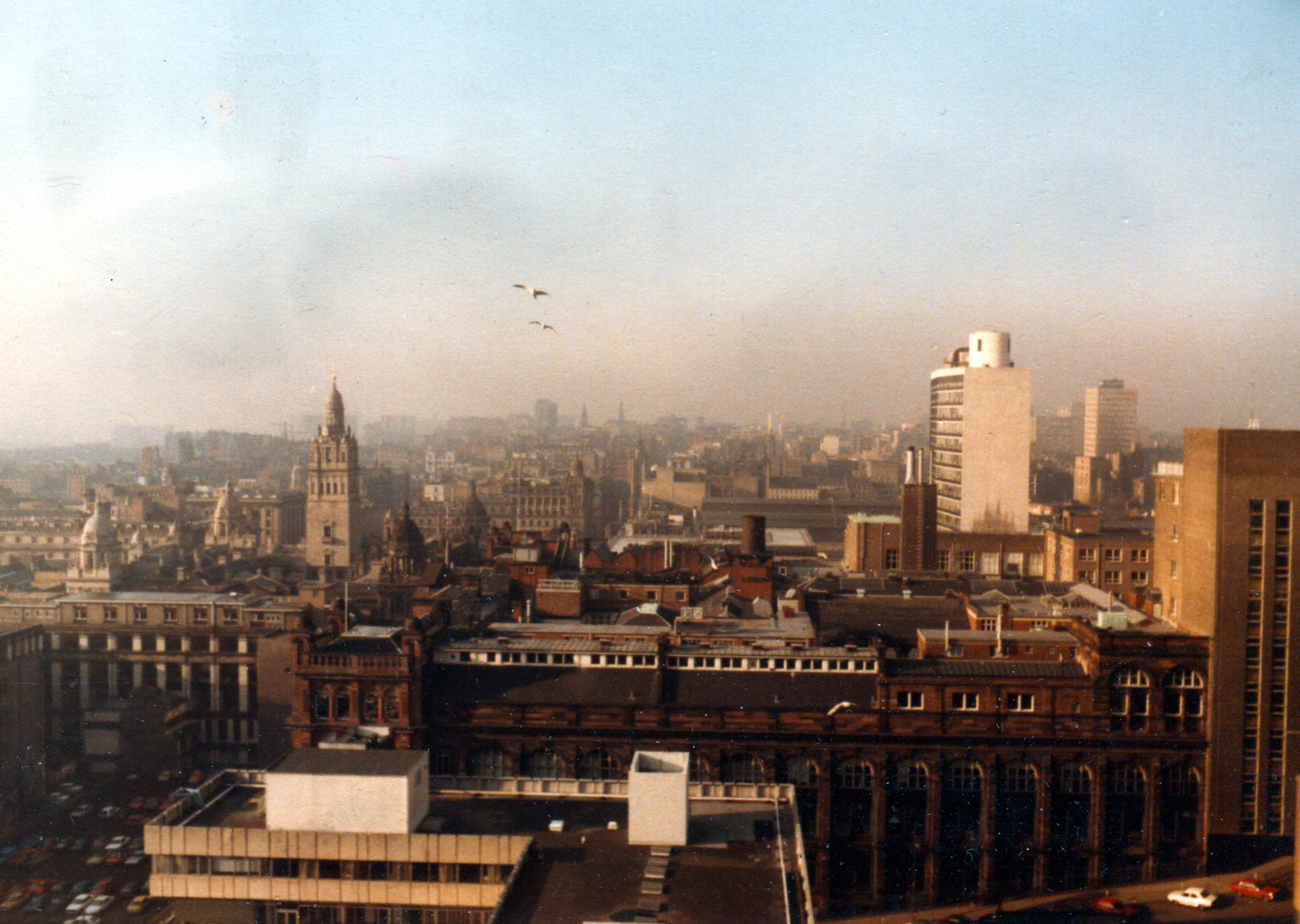
Glasgow in 1983, a year before the release of their single "Tinseltown in the Rain" which is credited as an "ode to the city of Glasgow"

Undaunted by this setback, they continued to play gigs around Glasgow, starting to write their own songs alongside the cover versions they were playing. Having no drummer and with limited musical ability, particularly in Buchanan's guitar playing (he later admitted that "we could play a little, but I was the worst by a long way"), the newly formed Blue Nile adopted an atmospheric, electronic approach primarily out of pragmatism. The band also made the most of their imagination, thrift and mechanical ingenuity. Buchanan recalled, "PJ had bought a tray from a waiter. It was made of zinc and it made a good noise when you hit it. We sampled it and PJ made a pad to trigger it from for £3. It was all very primitive back then — you had to hit it about two seconds before you wanted the sound to appear in the song."

The most commonly told story about the Blue Nile is that in 1983 they were approached by a local hi-fi manufacturer, Linn Products, and asked to produce a song that would showcase the Linn equipment to best effect. Linn was so pleased with the resulting record that it offered the Blue Nile a contract to make a whole album, and set up its own record label specifically to release it.

In interviews, both Buchanan and Moore have categorically denied that Linn approached the band to make a record for them, or that the record company influenced the album's sound in any way at all, with Moore saying, "It was a myth that we were a 'hi-fi band signed to a hi-fi company'. We just got lucky that we'd found our way to an excellent engineer who knew the company." The engineer in question was Calum Malcolm, with whom the band had already recorded some demos in his Castlesound studio near Edinburgh. Since Malcolm was a friend of Linn's founder Ivor Tiefenbrun, and had ties with the company, his studio was fitted out with Linn equipment. When Linn representatives visited one day and asked to hear some music to test out their new speakers, Malcolm played them the demo of "Tinseltown in the Rain". Impressed, Linn offered the band a contract with the record label it was in the process of setting up. Despite the fact that the group took nine months to reply to Linn's offer, the contract was eventually signed and its first album, A Walk Across the Rooftops, was released as Linn Records' first album in May 1984.

On its release, A Walk Across the Rooftops gained widespread acclaim from music critics for its mixture of sparse, detailed electronic sounds and Buchanan's soulful vocals, later described as a "fusion of chilly technology and a pitch of confessional, romantic soul". In 1984, the band gained greater exposure in Europe, with the videos for their two singles, "Stay" and "Tinseltown in the Rain", often shown on the video channel Music Box. The band's profile began to grow, although its existence remained precarious. Buchanan commented, "I've always found it strange that people missed the 'punk' aspect of A Walk Across the Rooftops. We were living in a flat in Glasgow with no hot water. We barely knew what we were doing and that was very liberating."

=== Hats and popularity (1985–1990) ===
Keen to capitalise on the positive critical reception awarded to A Walk Across the Rooftops, Linn sent the band back to Castlesound studio early in 1985 to produce a quick follow-up record. However, as the band later admitted, there was no new material ready to record, and they were not happy with the songs they were producing under pressure in the studio. The lack of progress led to stress and arguments, in particular between Buchanan (who tended to ultimately get his way in disputes) and Moore (who felt like a "third wheel" in the band due to the fact that Buchanan and Bell did most of the songwriting). In 2022, Moore recalled that his working relationship with Buchanan had already become "seriously strained", and that at one point "Paul was terrified to go into the studio, because I'd be in the studio and [he thought] I was going to ruin his buzz. It was falling apart."

Matters were not helped when Virgin Records, to whom Linn had licensed the band's records, began legal proceedings against the group and the label for not producing the new material stipulated in the licensing agreement. After two years with almost nothing to show for its efforts, the band was forced to leave the studio to make way for another band, and had to return home to Glasgow. Away from the pressures of the studio, the group overcame the writer's block and, eventually returning to Castlesound in 1988, was able to rapidly complete a new album.

Hats was released in October 1989 to rave reviews, including a rare five-star rating from Q magazine. Warmer and smoother sounding than the first album, and exploring the highs and lows of romantic love, Hats peaked at No. 12 on the UK Albums Chart. It was also the group's breakthrough record in the US, where it reached No. 108 on the US Billboard 200 albums chart in May 1990. All three singles released in the UK from the album made the top 75 in the UK Singles Chart.

The Blue Nile's first live public performance after making A Walk Across the Rooftops was in December 1989 on the television programme Halfway to Paradise, a Scottish-based arts magazine show broadcast on Channel 4. The band also composed and performed the theme tune for the programme, later released as a single B-side. The band played two songs with the American singer Rickie Lee Jones (who had recently befriended the band and had become one of its biggest supporters), performing her own "Flying Cowboys" and the Blue Nile's "Easter Parade". The duet version of "Easter Parade" was used as the B-side of both Jones's 1990 single, "Don't Let the Sun Catch You Crying", and the 12" single of "Headlights on the Parade". During 1990, the Blue Nile supported Jones on her US tour (their experience in America was filmed by BBC Scotland for a documentary titled Flags and Fences), followed by a tour of the UK culminating in two homecoming gigs in September 1990 at the Glasgow Royal Concert Hall, becoming the first non-classical band to play at the newly opened venue.

=== Peace at Last (1991–1996) ===
The radio play gained by Hats in the US, in particular the single "The Downtown Lights", brought the Blue Nile to the attention of several well-known US-based musicians. In 1991, the band was invited to Los Angeles to work on songs by Julian Lennon, Robbie Robertson and Michael McDonald. As a result, Buchanan moved to Los Angeles and lived there for a while, and had a relationship with the actress Rosanna Arquette between 1991 and 1993. Speaking about that period of his life Buchanan said, "It really was interesting. I have to say it was lived in all earnest ... And there was much good there, I enjoyed it, I really enjoyed it ... The great thing all the time was you were constantly wanting to phone friends and say, Guess who's in the shop? Guess who's in the supermarket? I'm not immune to all that. In the movies—celluloid's better than life isn't it? It makes everything glossy. I don't mean it's better, but it's so glamorous, I met lots of people—it was fascinating." The band also worked on Annie Lennox's first solo album, Diva, co-writing the track "The Gift". Lennox later covered "The Downtown Lights" (from Hats) for her second album, Medusa, released in 1995.

Having been let go by Linn and Virgin Records, the group signed a deal with Warner Bros. Records in 1992, although it later transpired that Buchanan had made the deal by himself without informing his bandmates. His explanation was that "none of the others were in town at the time". The band decided that it wanted to find somewhere private to record its new album with its portable studio, and began travelling around Europe searching for suitable locations. Having spent two years looking at and dismissing locations in cities such as Venice, Amsterdam and Copenhagen, the record was finally recorded piecemeal over three locations in Paris, Dublin and Los Angeles.

In June 1996, seven years after Hats, the Blue Nile released a third album, entitled Peace at Last. It displayed a marked difference in style to the first two albums, with Buchanan's acoustic guitar work more to the fore. Buchanan recalled that he had bought the guitar in a New York music shop, and by coincidence Robert Bell had seen the guitar earlier the same day and called Buchanan to tell him about it. A gospel choir made a brief appearance on the first single, "Happiness". Despite the release of Peace at Last on a major label, critical reaction to the album was more mixed than for the band's previous records, although sales were good, entering the UK albums chart at No. 13.

=== High (1997–2004) ===
The Blue Nile performing at the 1997 Glastonbury Festival

In 1997, the Blue Nile appointed a full-time manager for the first time - the experienced ex-Dire Straits manager, Ed Bicknell - who extricated the group from the deal with Warner Bros. He also attempted to persuade the band to change its recording habits, but had little success. Bicknell parted ways with the band in 2004, later saying that "in terms of the modern recording world the history of the Blue Nile was the most screwed-up I had ever encountered". Following tour dates in 1996 and 1997, culminating in an appearance at the Glastonbury Festival in June 1997, the Blue Nile disappeared from public view for the next seven years, apart from an appearance at a 2001 tribute concert at the Olympia Theatre in Dublin for the Irish music presenter Uaneen Fitzsimons, following her death in a car crash. A remixed version of the single "Tinseltown in the Rain" was used as the theme song for the BBC Scotland TV series Tinsel Town, broadcast in 2000 and 2001.

After the longest period yet between albums, the Blue Nile released High in August 2004. Part of the lengthy delay in making the record was due to Buchanan contracting a form of chronic fatigue syndrome which affected his health for two years, but as he explained on the album's release, it was mostly a result of the band's perfectionism taking hold once again, "We recorded an album and a half and ... we realised we weren't in love with it ... The vast majority of it we just dumped; we just put it to one side and didn't touch it any more." The album reached number 10 on the UK Albums Chart, the highest position to date for the band. Although acoustic guitar is still present on some tracks, the overall musical sound is more reminiscent of Hats.

=== Hiatus and future (2005) ===
It became apparent during the recording of High that old tensions among the band members had resurfaced. Buchanan's comments in a 2012 interview seemed to indicate that the album was finished out of a sense of duty and loyalty rather than any willingness to do so. "When we eventually finished High, I don't think it was bristling with the same joy and naivety we'd felt when we started. We'd gathered ourselves long enough to make it. It seemed to me a stoic record, to some extent a record about ourselves, though I didn't realise that 'til later. It was a collected and fairly stoic record which I was proud of and, in a sense, we just made ourselves focus. We showed up, we went into the room and worked, and whatever drift had set in we were loyal to each other and we knew we had to form the wagons into a circle."

During preparations for the tour in February 2005 following the album's release, Buchanan and Bell realised that Moore had stopped contacting them and would not be showing up for the tour. Although there was never an official statement to clarify whether the Blue Nile still existed, this was effectively the point when the band split up, and the last time that any of the members operated under the straightforward Blue Nile banner. In a 2006 interview, Buchanan insisted that he had remained friends with Moore. In another interview seven years later (in 2013), he acknowledged that he and Bell had, in fact, had virtually no contact with Moore since the recording of High. Buchanan has apparently not given up hope that the three members of the Blue Nile may make more music together in the future, saying, "I don't know where things stand with the other two guys ... In a way, I think it would be the right and proper thing to do but I'll just need to wait and see. If the others say let's do this ... Certainly, if I bump into them on a corner my hope would be that we could say: so what are you doing tomorrow?" He also lamented the estrangement with Moore, saying, "We're inhibited by the Scottish male thing where you have to give the other guy space, but I love PJ and there isn't a month goes by where I don't think about phoning him".

For his part, Moore has stated emphatically on several occasions that he will never rejoin the band, saying in communications sent in 2010 to the band's biographer that he was "finding it healthier to put all that behind me", and in a 2013 interview his terse reply to the question of a reunion was, "I think stuff happened that was simply beyond the pale. It's a shame, but if the feeling for sitting down together really isn't there, then continuing to do so even because you want to is pointless." In a 2022 interview with the Irish Independent, Moore mentioned that the three former members of The Blue Nile do occasionally encounter each other, but stated that a Blue Nile reunion was "just not going to happen.... It's like a marriage. When the marriage comes to an end, neither person wants to get back together or even think about getting back together. There were three of us in this marriage and the sex was rubbish!" He did, however, also state that he thought that "all of us are proud of the work that we did. We poured all of ourselves into [the records]. You can't ask much more than that."

=== Post-Blue Nile activity (2006–present) ===
Paul Buchanan and Robert Bell toured England and Scotland in May and June 2006, followed by Scotland and Ireland in November 2006, billed as "Paul Buchanan sings the songs of the Blue Nile", refraining from simply calling themselves the Blue Nile as a mark of respect for Moore's absence. The band consisted of Buchanan on vocals and guitar, Bell on bass guitar and keyboards, Alan Cuthbertson and Brendan Smith on keyboards, Stuart McCredie on guitar, and Liam Bradley on drums. On 14 July 2007, Buchanan and Bell played at the Bridgewater Hall in Manchester as part of the Manchester International Festival. In 2006 PJ Moore befriended Scottish composer/producer Malcolm Lindsay, eventually leading to his writing the libretto for Lindsay's 2018 operatic score for Oscar van Heek's 2018 film Dark Water. This in turn led to the creation in 2020 of a new band, PJ Moore & Co., consisting of Moore, Lindsay and singer Mike McKenzie (winner of BBC Radio Scotland's Singer-Songwriter of the Year in 2019). On 22 September 2022, PJ Moore and Co. released their debut album, When a Good Day Comes on Mozie Records.

In July 2008, the band played shows at the Glasgow Royal Concert Hall, Somerset House in London and the Radisson Hotel in Galway. In September 2010, a biography of the Blue Nile by the Scottish journalist Allan Brown, titled Nileism: The Strange Course of the Blue Nile, was published. Although Brown was a long-time acquaintance of Buchanan, he found Buchanan reluctant to participate, and both Bell and Moore refused Brown's invitations for interviews or any co-operation with the book's writing.

In May 2012, Buchanan released his first (and, to date, only) solo album, Mid Air, a collection of short, stripped-back songs mostly with just Buchanan's voice and piano, recorded with Calum Malcolm's son Cameron as the album's engineer and released on Buchanan's own Newsroom Records label. In a radio interview, Buchanan mentioned that towards the end of the recording process he had called in Robert Bell to help out on two tracks ("Mid Air" and "My True Country") that neither he nor Cameron Malcolm were satisfied with. Bell also later remixed "Buy a Motor Car", which appeared on the deluxe edition of the album released in October 2012. The album peaked at number 14 on the UK Albums Chart of 2 June 2012, and its title track, "Mid Air", was used a year later in the Richard Curtis film, About Time.

In November 2012, Virgin Records released two-CD "Collector's Edition" versions of the band's first two albums, A Walk Across the Rooftops and Hats. Each version had the original album remastered by engineer Calum Malcolm, along with a bonus disc of rare and previously unreleased material selected by Buchanan and Bell. A similar reissue of the third album, Peace at Last, was released on 3 March 2014. In July 2016, Buchanan took part in the David Bowie Prom at the Royal Albert Hall. His performance of Bowie's "I Can't Give Everything Away" was praised by The Guardian.

In 2019, the band's major label albums were re-issued on vinyl, with a re-issue of High charting at number 74 in the UK charts after being released by Confetti Records on 5 June 2020 as vinyl or double CD edition.

== Legacy ==
The band has influenced future musicians such as Duncan Sheik, who covered the song "Stay", as well as Wild Beasts.

Matty Healy, the 1975's lead singer and primary songwriter, labeled the Blue Nile his "favourite band of all time" and declared Hats to be his "favourite record of the '80s." Healy would describe the 1975's 2018 song "Love It If We Made It" as the "Blue Nile on steroids" and told Entertainment Weekly that "I wanted to reference 'The Downtown Lights'; I didn't want to hide away from referencing it. I wanted it to be fucking obvious to people that know." Taylor Swift, who had previously been in a relationship with Healy, referenced the band in her 2024 song "Guilty as Sin?" with the opening lyrics "Drowning in the Blue Nile, he sent me 'Downtown Lights', I hadn't heard it in a while." Streams for "The Downtown Lights" rose 1,400% in the four-day period following the release of Swift's album. Ten days after the album's release, the vinyl stock of all four of the Blue Nile's albums were sold out on their website.

== Discography ==
=== Albums ===
List of studio albums, with selected details and peak chart positions
Title	Details	Peak chart positions						Certifications
Title	Details	SCO	UK	AUS	BEL	NZ	US	Certifications
A Walk Across the Rooftops	Released: 30 April 1984; Label: Linn; Format: LP, cassette, CD	12	80	84	–	24	–	BPI: Silver
Hats	Released: 9 October 1989; Label: Linn; Format: LP, cassette, CD	6	12	–	—	–	108	
Peace at Last	Released: 10 June 1996; Label: Warner Bros.; Format: LP, cassette, CD	3	13	–	–	46	– (Note: Peace at Last did not chart within the main US Billboard 200 charts, but did peak at number 48 on the US Heatseekers charts)	
High	Released: 30 August 2004; Label: Sanctuary; Format: LP, CD, digital download	4	10	–	48	–	–	BPI: Silver

=== Singles ===
List of singles, with selected peak chart positions
Title	Year	Peak chart positions				Album
Title	Year	UK	SCO	NL	US Alt	Album
"I Love This Life"	1981	—	—	—	—	non-album single
"Stay"	1984	97	—	—	—	A Walk Across the Rooftops
"Tinseltown in the Rain"	1984	87	—	28	—	A Walk Across the Rooftops
"The Downtown Lights"	1989	67	—	—	10	Hats
"Headlights on the Parade"	1990	72	—	—	—	Hats
"Saturday Night"	1991	50	—	—	—	Hats
"Happiness"	1996	88	37	—	—	Peace at Last
"I Would Never"	2004	52	56	—	—	High
"She Saw the World"	2004	—	—	—	—	High

=== Unreleased material ===
Four unreleased tracks from the Rooftops and Hats sessions can be found on bootleg recordings. These include:

- "St Catherine's Day"
- "Christmas"
- "Young Club"
- "Broadway in the Snow"

The first two of these were subsequently included on the deluxe releases of the first two albums.

An instrumental version of "Stay Close" from High was available as an MP3 download from the band's website. The remixed version of "Soul Boy" that appeared on the "She Saw The World" single was also available as an MP3 download.

A remixed version of "Tinseltown in the Rain" was used as the theme music for the BBC Scotland drama series Tinsel Town.

Buchanan played a number of new tracks in his 2006 solo shows which are regarded by many fans as unreleased Blue Nile songs. These can be found on live bootlegs, and include:

- "Runaround Girl"
- "Meanwhile"
- "Start Again"

== Collaborations with other artists ==
- Julian Lennon – Help Yourself (1991): the track "Other Side of Town" features vocals by Buchanan, written by Buchanan and Bell
- Robbie Robertson – Storyville (1991): the track "Breakin' the Rules" features vocals and guitar by Buchanan and bass guitar and drum programming by Bell; the track "Sign of the Rainbow" features bass guitar by Bell. Paul Joseph Moore (as Paul Moore) plays keyboards on four of the songs, including "Breakin' the Rules", on which he also does the drum programming.
- Nicky Holland – Nicky Holland (1992): the track "Running Around Again" produced and co-written by Bell
- Rickie Lee Jones – "Easter Parade"
- Annie Lennox – Diva (1992): the track "The Gift" co-written by Annie Lennox and the Blue Nile
- Michael McDonald – Blink of an Eye (1993): the track "I Want You" written and produced by Paul Buchanan & Robert Bell
- The Devlins – Drift (1993): the track "I Don't Want to Be Like This" produced by Bell
- Matraca Berg – The Speed of Grace (1994): the track "Let's Face It" written by Buchanan
- Máire Brennan – Misty Eyed Adventures (1995): the track "Big Yellow Taxi" produced by the Blue Nile
- Chris Botti – Midnight Without You (1997): the track "Midnight Without You" features the Blue Nile, written by Chris Botti, Buchanan and Moore
- Peter Gabriel – OVO (2000): the tracks "Downside Up" and "Make Tomorrow" feature vocals by Paul Buchanan
- Quiet City (aka the Blue Nile's drummer Nigel Thomas) – Public Face, Private Face (2002): the tracks "Due North" and "Things We Should Say" feature vocals by Buchanan
- Texas – Red Book (2005): the track "Sleep" features vocals by Buchanan
- Michael Brook – RockPaperScissors (2006): the track "RockPaperScissors" features vocals by Buchanan
- Aqualung – Memory Man (2007): the track "Garden of Love" features vocals by Buchanan
- Paula Cole – Courage (2007): the track "Until I Met You" features vocals by Buchanan
- Various Artists – Seasons of Light Christmas album (2007): the tracks "Seasons of Light" and "Silent Night" feature vocals by Buchanan
- Robin Danar – Altered States (2008): the track "Message of Love" features vocals by Buchanan (cover version of the Pretenders song)
- Aqualung – Magnetic North (2010): the track "36 Hours" co-written by Matt Hales and Paul Buchanan
- Up Dharma Down – Capacities (2012): the track "Feelings" features vocals by Buchanan
- Craig Armstrong – The Space Between Us (1998) a new version of the track "Let's Go Out Tonight" by The Blue Nile is performed by Buchanan with Craig Armstrong
- Craig Armstrong – It's Nearly Tomorrow (2014) — two tracks featuring vocals by Buchanan: "All Around Love" and "It's Not Alright"
- Jessie Ware – Glasshouse (2017): the track "Last of The True Believers" features vocals by Buchanan

== Bibliography ==
- Brown, Allan (2010). Nileism: The Strange Course of the Blue Nile. Edinburgh, Scotland: Polygon Books. ISBN 978-1-84697-138-9.
- Huntley, Elliot J.; Hall, Edith (2010). From a Late Night Train: An Introduction to The Blue Nile. Sheffield, England: Pickard Communications. ISBN 978-1-905278-36-7.
