= A Walk Across the Rooftops =

Studio album by the Blue Nile
- Released: 30 April 1984
- Recorded: 1981–1983
- Studios: Castlesound Studios, Pencaitland, East Lothian, Scotland
- Genres: Sophisti-pop; synth-pop; ambient; blue-eyed soul
- Length: 37:47
- Labels: Linn, A&M
- Producers: Paul Buchanan and Robert Bell

The Blue Nile chronology
A Walk Across the Rooftops (1984)	Hats (1989)

Singles from A Walk Across the Rooftops
- 1. "Stay" Released: 13 April 1984 (reissued: 29 October 1984); 2. "Tinseltown in the Rain" Released: 20 August 1984

A Walk Across the Rooftops is the debut album by Scottish band The Blue Nile, released on 30 April 1984 on Linn Records in the UK and on A&M Records in the US. Although the album was released to little fanfare and was not a big hit on its initial release, it slowly accumulated fans and sales through word of mouth as the years passed, and by the time the follow-up Hats was released in 1989, A Walk Across the Rooftops had sold 80,000 copies.

It continued to gather praise when reissued in 2012, and in 2015, was certified Silver by the British Phonographic Industry (BPI) in the United Kingdom, indicating sales in excess of 60,000 copies.

== Background ==
Having put out their debut single "I Love This Life" in 1981, the Blue Nile spent the next couple of years playing gigs in their native Glasgow: with little money and due to singer Paul Buchanan's limited ability on the guitar, by necessity their songs were stripped-down cover versions of old songs, and as Buchanan later said, "I suppose to some extent that started to bleed into our own songs – there was more and more space in what we were doing". Buchanan and Robert Bell's songs would start out written on an acoustic guitar or a piano, and then together with third member Paul Joseph "PJ" Moore and engineer Calum Malcolm the songs would be rearranged in the studio.

A persistent myth about the album's origins is that the band were approached by Linn Products and commissioned to make a record that the company could use to demonstrate the quality of their high-specification hi-fi equipment—the company were so pleased with the result that they decided to form a record label specifically to release the resulting album. In fact Linn had already recently manufactured a cutting lathe to produce their own records, frustrated by the poor quality of the test LPs that were being provided for their flagship turntable product, the Linn Sondek LP12, and had already set up and released records on their ALOI (A Label of Integrity) Records label before signing the Blue Nile. An article in Music Week in January 1984 states that Linn's aim was to make very high quality vinyl records, "..to compete with CCD, rather than following the general trend towards digital" and "..put out audiophile-standard discs, at normal price". According to Paul Buchanan, the true story was that the band had already made demo recordings of some of their songs with engineer Calum Malcolm at his Castlesound Studios, which happened to be fitted out with Linn equipment as Malcolm had worked with the company in the past. Linn were visiting the studios and asked Malcolm to play a song recently recorded at the studio in order to test out their new speakers, and Malcolm duly obliged and chose the Blue Nile's demo of "Tinseltown in the Rain". On hearing the demo, Linn were impressed and felt the band's sound fitted in with the type of music they wanted to release on their new label, and contacted the Blue Nile to offer a contract to make a full album: even so, it took the band a full nine months to respond to the company's offer. Buchanan recalled that Linn had given the band £10,000–£20,000 to make the record, but rejected the suggestion that the company had asked the band to make a record in a particular style that would show off the company's products in the best light, saying, "It was great because they left us to it. They trusted the engineer and they trusted us so they said, go off and make a record ... We were—as you would imagine—you're so fervent about what you're doing that nothing would dissuade you from it and nothing would persuade you to do otherwise ... we'd already demo'd some of the things before we'd even met Linn so ... no, it was nothing to do with that." PJ Moore also denied that Linn had deliberately chosen the band to produce a demo record for them, telling Uncut magazine that "it was a myth that we were a 'hi-fi band signed to a hi-fi company'. We just got lucky that we'd found our way to an excellent engineer who knew the company."

== Recording ==
The album was recorded over five months in 1983 at Castlesound Studios, which Malcolm had set up in 1979 in the former primary school building in the village of Pencaitland, 12 miles (19 km) east of Edinburgh. Living first in a rented flat in Edinburgh, and then later sleeping on Malcolm's floor when their money ran out, the band laboured over the album because all the sounds on the record had to be created and played physically. The band also had exacting standards and obsessed about every detail on the album: Malcolm recalled that "they were always particularly sensitive to not doing the wrong thing and making sure it had absolutely the right emotional impact: there were times when I'm sure everyone else felt something was done and then someone would throw a spanner in the works over some little thing".

== Release ==
A Walk Across the Rooftops became the first album released on the new Linn Records label, released on 30 April 1984 and reaching number 80 on the UK Albums Chart. Two singles were released from the album in the UK, with minor success: "Stay" reached number 97 on the UK Singles Chart, and "Tinseltown in the Rain" reached number 87. The video for "Tinseltown in the Rain" featured on the VHS video version of the compilation album Now That's What I Call Music 3, but the song was not included on the vinyl LP or cassette versions of the album.

In November 2012 Virgin Records released two-CD "Collector's Edition" versions of A Walk Across the Rooftops and its 1989 follow-up Hats in the UK and Europe, each containing a remastered version of the original album plus a second CD of bonus tracks. The remastering process was overseen by original engineer Calum Malcolm, along with contributions by Paul Buchanan and Robert Bell, who chose the songs for the bonus CD.

== Artwork ==
The photograph of the band on the front cover was taken on Cathcart Road in Glasgow. The building on the right of the picture was the Hermon Baptist Church, a single-storey pent-roofed structure built on to the end of a block of tenement houses. At some point the tenements were demolished and the church stood in isolation for some years until it was destroyed by fire in 2001, and subsequently demolished.

== Critical reception ==
Professional ratings
Review scores
Source	Rating
AllMusic	4/5 stars
Classic Pop	4.5/5 stars
The Irish Times	4/5 stars
Mojo	4/5 stars
Pitchfork	8.7/10
PopMatters	9/10
Q	4/5 stars
The Rolling Stone Album Guide	3.5/5 stars
Smash Hits	9/10
Sounds	5/5 stars
Uncut	10/10

=== Contemporary reception ===
A Walk Across the Rooftops received great acclaim from the UK music press on its release in 1984. In a five-star review Sounds said, "Their music cuts a deep swathe right through the centre of blond-streaked wimpdom, without stance or calculation ... For the first time in a long time, they make you care. Melody Maker proclaimed, "The Blue Nile's stunning debut album seduces the emotions as well as the senses, and instead of fighting its effect, the sensible thing to do is relax and enjoy it ... There's a mesmeric quality in this music that makes you want to savour every track with the respectful appreciation of a connoisseur. Like a good book you don't want it to end, but when it does that thrilling potency loses nothing in repetition ... A Walk Across the Rooftops generates a rarefied atmosphere that's a comfort to the soul. If this is just a sampler of The Blue Nile's catalogue, then we're in for a whole new chapter in delight." Smash Hits' Ian Cranna stated that The Blue Nile with their debut album went "Straight into a league of their own": "The songs are superb — imagery at its best (each song a perfect capsule), sung with passion and a touch of weary melancholy over inventive, modern arrangements". NME described the album as "music to shade your dreamtime in subtle colours, a quiet influence, delicious persuasion ... It's difficult to describe (often a good sign), without too many specific features to pick upon. It's easier to suggest the moods it evokes: romance, doubt, a rich sadness. The keynote is restraint; far from straining for effort, The Blue Nile allow their music to find its own atmospheres ... To correct any misunderstanding: what The Blue Nile are not is, say, wispy or precious. There's red meat in this music, and a human pulse beat. The beauty is unassuming, the intelligence is uncontrived. It's good news. Great music is still being made."

In the US Rolling Stone felt that "the music slips between the cracks, an effortless flow of acoustic and electronic sounds with nary a hook ... What's required of the listener is patience, not fortitude; this shimmering music is not difficult, just sophisticated ... The Blue Nile flows across a calm, clean, misty landscape where complex technology is integrated with a palpable emotional component. Their music falls outside the known categories, presenting a seductive world for the receptive." However, Spin was not so impressed, criticising the relentlessly downbeat tone of the tracks and Buchanan's singing, saying, "that's what makes this collection begin to wear on the nerves. Repetition and a distressing inertia prevent it from being precious."

=== Retrospective reviews ===
AllMusic said, "The seven lengthy tracks on A Walk Across the Rooftops all follow the model of the opener, with Paul Buchanan's rich voice at the center of near-symphonic arrangements that manage to sound lush and incredibly austere at the same time. The tempos are deadly slow, with the most upbeat track, 'Tinseltown in the Rain', barely rising above a graceful saunter, and the inventive arrangements make extensive use of empty space." Reviewing the 2012 remastered version, BBC Music claimed that the album was "still a landmark, still high, still somehow intangible ... 1984's A Walk Across the Rooftops remains unique in its fusion of chilly technology and a pitch of confessional, romantic soul that 'alternative' types would usually shy away for fear it wasn't 'cool' ... in the years since, its peerless power to affect has accrued multiple layers of rueful resonance." PopMatters believed that "A Walk Across the Rooftops proved to be perfect for someone almost seeking to relearn the art of listening to music; perhaps because it seemed to have been made by people who were in the early stages of learning how to make miraculous music from simple building blocks. This was a necessity as none of the members were trained musicians, but the resulting album of very simple, carefully constructed compositions proved far greater than the sum of its parts." Reviewing the remastered versions of A Walk Across the Rooftops and Hats together, Mojo stated that they "remain superior, elegant examples of masterful craftmanship. Both albums present emotive, electro-acoustic mood pieces with elements of soul and classical minimalism ... exquisite music for the small hours in which little is said but much is revealed".

=== Accolades ===
NME placed A Walk Across the Rooftops at number 28 in its critics' list of albums of the year in 1984, while the single "Tinseltown in the Rain" placed at number 27 in the equivalent singles list.

In 1989 Record Mirror placed A Walk Across the Rooftops at number 74 in its critics' list of the best albums of the 1980s. The Guardian included A Walk Across the Rooftops in their 2007 feature 1000 Albums to Hear Before You Die, saying, "This stunning debut album was an 80s high-water mark ... The arrangements meld electro and contemporary classical influences into a rich and satisfyingly yearning whole." The album was also included in the book 1001 Albums You Must Hear Before You Die.

It was voted number 407 in the third edition of Colin Larkin's All Time Top 1000 Albums (2000).

== Track listing ==
All songs written, composed and arranged by Paul Buchanan and Robert Bell.

Side one
No.	Title	Length
1.	"A Walk Across the Rooftops"	4:56
2.	"Tinseltown in the Rain"	5:57
3.	"From Rags to Riches"	5:59

Side two
No.	Title	Length
1.	"Stay"	4:57
2.	"Easter Parade"	4:34
3.	"Heatwave"	6:28
4.	"Automobile Noise"	5:08

2012 remastered edition bonus disc
No.	Title	Length
1.	"I Love This Life"	4:02
2.	"Heatwave" (Rhythm Mix)	5:50
3.	"St. Catherine's Day"	4:42
4.	"Tinseltown in the Rain" (Mix)	6:31
5.	"The Second Act"	4:39
6.	"Stay" (Little Mix)	3:34
7.	"Regret"	3:37

== Personnel ==
The Blue Nile

- Robert Bell – bass, synthesizers
- Paul Buchanan – vocals, guitars, synthesizers
- Paul Joseph Moore – keyboards, synthesizers

Additional personnel

- Calum Malcolm – recording engineer
- Nigel Thomas – drums

== Charts ==
Chart (1984)	Peak position
Australian Albums (Kent Music Report)	83
New Zealand Albums (RMNZ)	24
UK Albums (Official Charts)	80

Chart (2012)	Peak position
Scottish Albums (Official Charts)	12

== Certifications ==
Certifications for A Walk Across the Rooftops
Region	Certification	Certified units/sales
United Kingdom (BPI)	Silver	60,000^{‡}
^{‡} Sales+streaming figures based on certification alone.

== Release history ==
Region	Date	Label	Format	Catalog
United Kingdom	30 April 1984	Linn Records	LP	LKH 1
United Kingdom	30 April 1984	Linn Records	cassette	LKHC 1
United States	1984	A&M Records	LP	SP-06-5087
United States	1984	A&M Records	cassette	CS-06-5087
United Kingdom	1989	Linn Records	CD	LKHCD 1
United States	1989	A&M Records	CD	CD 5087
United Kingdom	19 November 2012	Virgin Records	Remastered 2CD collector's edition	LKHCDR 1
Europe	19 November 2012	Virgin Records	Remastered 2CD collector's edition	5099901730326
United Kingdom	20 January 2013	Virgin Records	180-gram vinyl	LKHR 1
United Kingdom, Europe & United States	14 December 2018	Confetti Records	Remastered 2CD collector's edition (same content as 2012 reissue)	BLUECD1/5052442014935
