= Linn Records =

- Parent company: Linn Products
- Founded: 1982
- Genre: Classical, jazz, Scottish
- Country of origin: Scotland
- Location: Glasgow
- Official website: www.linnrecords.com

Linn Records is a Glasgow-based record label which specialises in classical music, jazz and Scottish music. It is part of Linn Products.

== History ==
While Linn engineers were testing their flagship product, the Sondek LP12 turntable, they became frustrated with some of the specialist test LPs they were using. Work began on an LP cutting lathe as a research product to improve testing for the LP12.

The first album to be cut and subsequently released was A Walk Across the Rooftops by The Blue Nile. They also released Carol Kidd's debut album.

Linn Records is an audiophile label, specialising in classical, jazz and Celtic music, and won the Record Label of the Year award at the 2010 Gramophone Awards. Release formats include CD, SACD, HDCD, vinyl and digital downloads.

Between 1995 and 2011 Linn artwork was designed by John Haxby. Since September 2013, all artwork has been designed by GM Toucari.

== High resolution downloads ==
As of February 2013 all 'Studio Master' downloads from linnrecords.com are available in FLAC format, ALAC (Apple Lossless Audio Codec.) and MP3.

In 2008, Linn Records started to host music for other labels and now offers a library of more than 700 Studio Master Quality albums from 96 different labels. The start of 2012 saw the label form a partnership with Universal to sell a range of their back catalogue.

== Artists ==
Classical artists include:

- Avison Ensemble
- Alfie Boe
- Boston Baroque
- Katherine Bryan
- John Butt (musician)
- Dunedin Consort
- Ingrid Fliter
- James Gilchrist
- Peter Harvey (baritone)
- Ruthie Henshall
- Yuniko Kato
- Kebyart
- Sir Charles Mackerras
- Sivan Magen
- Nigel North
- Martin Pearlman
- Phantasm (music group)
- Trevor Pinnock
- Artur Pizarro
- The Prince Consort
- Profeti della Quinta
- Robin Ticciati
- Scottish Chamber Orchestra
- Trio Sonnerie
- Willard White
- Benjamin Zander

Jazz artists include:

- Liane Carroll
- Ray Gelato
- Barb Jungr
- Carol Kidd
- Claire Martin
- Ian Shaw
- Martin Taylor

Other artists include:

- Amy Duncan
- Emily Barker
- Fiona Mackenzie
- Maeve O'Boyle
- William Orbit

== See also ==
- List of record labels
