= Jordan: The Comeback =

Studio album by Prefab Sprout
- Released: 28 August 1990
- Recorded: 1989–1990
- Genres: Sophisti-pop; art pop
- Length: 63:45
- Labels: Kitchenware; CBS
- Producer: Thomas Dolby

Prefab Sprout chronology
Protest Songs (1989)	Jordan: The Comeback (1990)	A Life of Surprises: The Best of Prefab Sprout (1992)

Singles from Jordan: The Comeback
- 1. "Looking for Atlantis" Released: August 1990; 2. "We Let the Stars Go" Released: October 1990

Jordan: The Comeback is the fifth studio album by English pop band Prefab Sprout, released by Kitchenware Records and CBS on 28 August 1990. Comprising 19 tracks and incorporating a range of musical styles and lyrical themes, the album has been regarded by both the band and critics as its most ambitious project. It was produced by Thomas Dolby, who had previously worked with the band on their 1985 album Steve McQueen but had been unable to participate fully in the production of its 1988 follow-up, From Langley Park to Memphis.

Frontman Paddy McAloon divided the album thematically into four sections – conventional pop songs, a suite about Elvis Presley, love songs and material exploring "death and fate". The lyrics frequently address religion and celebrity, alluding to figures such as Jesse James, Agnetha Fältskog, God and the Devil. Upon its release, the album received widespread critical acclaim and achieved commercial success, reaching number 7 on the UK Albums Chart. Its singles performed less successfully – "Looking for Atlantis" and "We Let the Stars Go" peaked at number 51 and 50, respectively, on the UK Singles Chart while Jordan: The EP reached number 35. The album was nominated for Brit Award for British Album of the Year at the 1991 Brit Awards.

== Background and recording ==
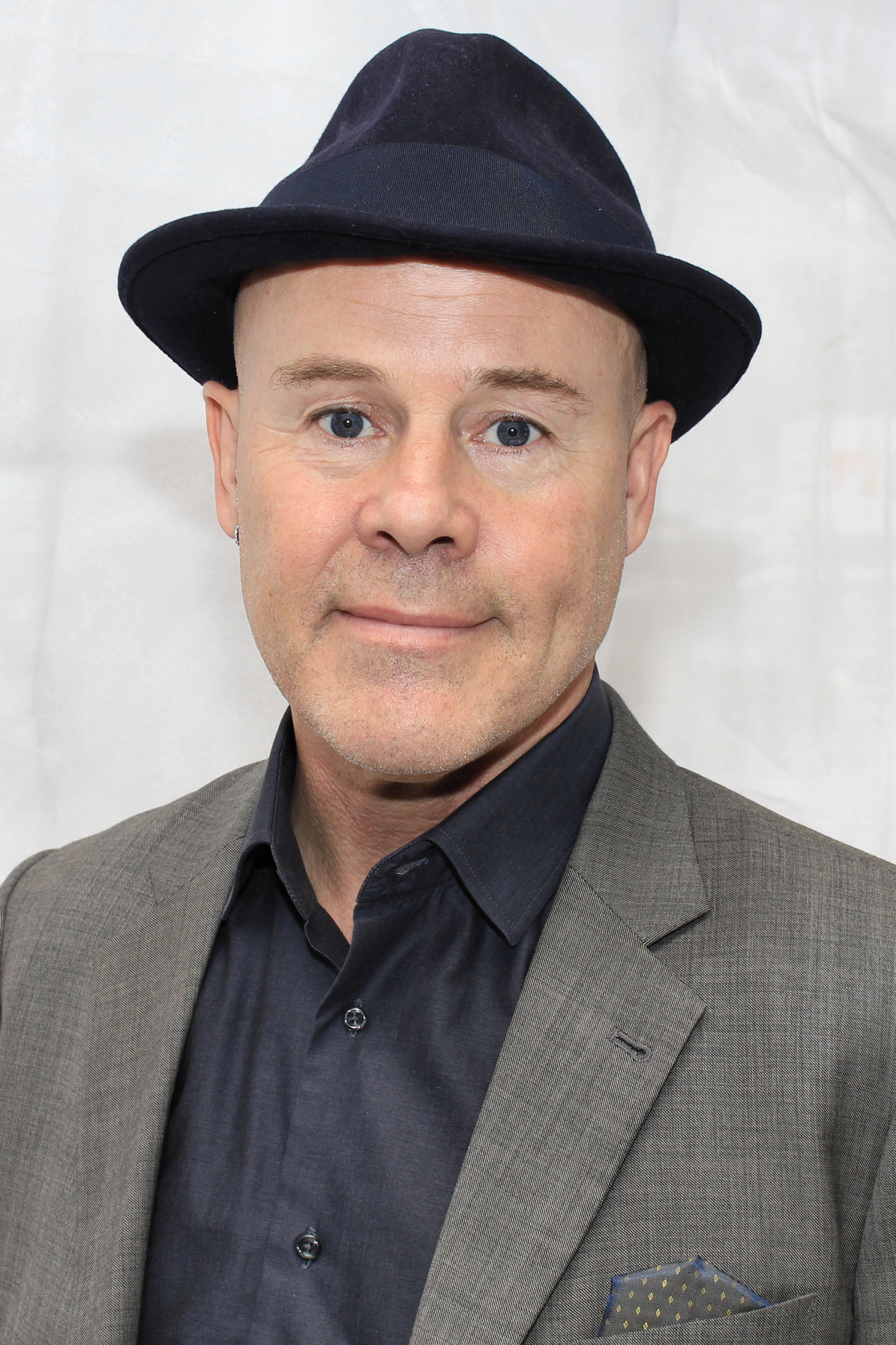
Thomas Dolby produced the album's nineteen tracks.

Following the release of the successful From Langley Park to Memphis (1988), frontman Paddy McAloon spent around a year writing and recording demos for Prefab Sprout's next album. He created home recordings more elaborate than those for previous albums and wished for the project to resemble a Disney movie soundtrack produced by Trevor Horn. McAloon kept in contact with collaborator Thomas Dolby, described by Giles Smith of The Independent as "a producer who works from a sound-library of other-wordly squeaks and shimmers". (Note: Dolby had produced the band's acclaimed second album Steve McQueen (1985) and four tracks on From Langley Park to Memphis (1988).) When Dolby received a demo tape, he considered many of the songs so complete that there was little he could do to improve them. McAloon, however, felt strongly that the album needed to be made in a professional recording studio. He ultimately considered Dolby's contribution in the studio so great that, barring a few tracks, he was a de facto band member on the album.

Recording commenced in June 1989, with the album title announced the same month in the press release for Protest Songs. (Note: A self-produced album originally scheduled for release in 1985, Protest Songs was put on hold for commercial reasons and finally released after From Langley Park to Memphis despite being recorded before it.) The band – Paddy and Martin McAloon, Wendy Smith and Neil Conti – initially recorded at Ridge Farm Studio, Surrey. Paddy McAloon began the sessions having already carefully planned the album's running order in the demo stage. He intended the album to feature 24 songs but CBS were concerned about the commercial appeal of a double album. Compromising, Prefab Sprout took the standard advance for a single album and recorded 19 tracks. The subsequent budgetary issues placed a strain on recording; the sessions, intended to last three months, ultimately stretched to around a year and caused Dolby to be away from his wife Kathleen Beller. After six months, the band travelled to Los Angeles to continue recording the album, with the couple putting them up at their home. Dolby and McAloon mixed the completed album in a small L.A. studio.

== Musical and lyrical style ==
Jordan: The Comeback has been described as "nineteen songs dipped in conceptual aspic". The album's tracklisting can be divided into four sections – straightforward pop songs, songs concerning Elvis Presley, love songs and songs about "death and fate". Common to all four sections is the theme of rebirth and renewal, the "comeback" of the album's title. McAloon felt most people "would like to be able to go back and do things differently". Several songs on the album contain references to God and religious imagery, a feature present in some of the band's earlier work. McAloon was inspired by the power of gospel music and concepts from his youth in a Catholic seminary. He felt his own agnosticism lent a tension to his work.

The album features a variety of genres, among them funk, disco, country and bolero. McAloon took inspiration from K-tel compilation albums, attracted to the idea of "the listener being inundated with all these musical styles coming at them one after another". The arrangements largely employ soft textures, something McAloon deemed "the most avant-garde thing you can do" amidst the rock music scene of 1990. According to the Gavin Report, "ever present are the rich chord changes with slices of sly sampling". Stuart Maconie of the NME considered the album's sound world "informed more by Pet Sounds and Phil Spector than punk rock or acid house" and felt its tracks exhibited "a tension between a love of the mainstream pop song tradition and McAloon's own unusual musical personality". Many of the compositions carry the influence of Broadway theatre and McAloon found inspiration in songwriters including Rodgers and Hart, Burt Bacharach and Rod Temperton. Writing in 2022, John Earls of Classic Pop considered the album to be Prefab Sprout's most "band-sounding", remarking "Martin McAloon and drummer Neil Conti's rhythm section were never so fluid."

== Songs ==
=== Tracks 1–5 ===
The album's first five tracks are straightforward pop songs without an overarching thematic connection. "Looking for Atlantis" is built around McAloon's nylon-string Ibanez guitar and atypically uses only two chords. McAloon described its central sentiment as "stop wasting time, find someone and fall in love with them". He regarded the hip hop-influenced "Wild Horses" as one of the album's strongest tracks. Its lyrics are written from the perspective of "the older man longing for the younger girl, without it being seedy". Mcaloon initially considered submitting the song to Daryl Hall for consideration. Actress Jenny Agutter provided the spoken-word passage accompanying the instrumental section.

"Machine Gun Ibiza" utilises funk rhythms and wah-wah guitar in an arrangement Time Out compared to the work of Sly Stone. The song originated in a pub conversation referencing both Jimi Hendrix's "Machine Gun" and Ibiza, and lyrically concerns a hero partly based on Hendrix and described by McAloon as "the coolest guy on the planet". The character is referred to as "a top rollmo star" – 'rollmo' being a word McAloon dreamt Michael Jackson taught him. (Note: In this dream, McAloon found himself "stuck in the studio with [Jackson] and his brothers discussing the recording session. Michael says 'Ah, you want to give it a little more rollmo'. When I asked Michael what it meant, he said 'Rollmo is a term we picked up back in the Motown days – it's a little bit of magic you've got to add to it, whether it's in the recording process or whether it's something to do with the deal you make. Rollmo makes it a little more special'. McAloon also dreamt that Jackson's follow-up to Thriller would be titled The Flimsy World of Film.) The ballad "We Let the Stars Go" was composed on piano on the morning of 29 August 1988; McAloon had tickets to see Jackson in Leeds that day but ultimately didn't go. The song features the name "Paddy Joe" in reference to McAloon's own given names Patrick Joseph. He has described it as "a boy-loses-girl song with a little bit of autobiographical detail thrown in". "Carnival 2000" is about the celebrating the turn of the Millennium. The song began as a simple piano piece before being worked up into a samba-inspired production at the insistence of Dolby.

=== Tracks 6–9 (Elvis) ===
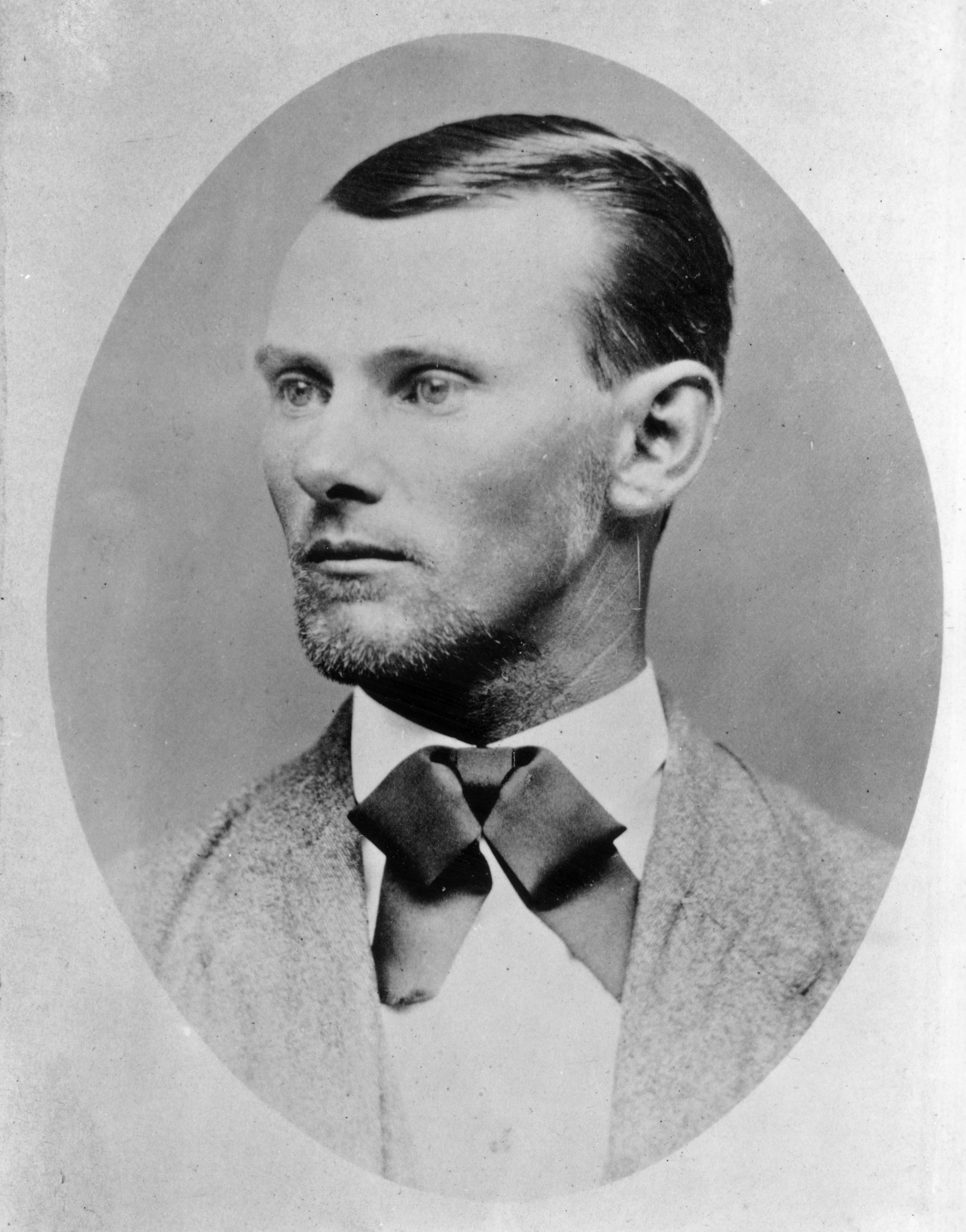
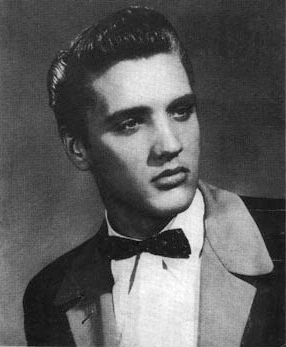
The Jesse James suite draws a parallel between the outlaw and Elvis Presley

Tracks six through nine constitute what McAloon called "the Elvis section" as all four songs were written for or about Elvis Presley. (Note: McAloon felt Presley became "a symbol of America himself, a piece of Americana" by the 1970s and found inspiration in the singer's recording of "An American Trilogy".) "Jordan: The Comeback" imagines Presley, who died in 1977, still alive and living a reclusive existence in the Nevada desert. He has become distant from rock and roll and is waiting for the right song to return with. McAloon described "Jordan: The Comeback" as "a kind of mini-musical where the pumping bass is both Elvis's hip work and the throbbing of convertibles on endless highways." The verses follow Presley's thoughts (delivered in a Southern drawl) over music intended to sound like a Las Vegas band, while the chorus serves as the spiritual song he returns with ("End of the road I'm travelling, I will see Jordan beckoning"). (Note: The verses of "Jordan: The Comeback" imagine Presley's answer to Albert Goldman's controversial posthumous biography Elvis (1981).) McAloon chose the River Jordan as the subject of the chorus because he believed Presley felt closest to gospel in his last years. He described the river as a "place of resurrection" and linked it to Presley through his backing vocalists, the Jordanaires.

"Jesse James Symphony" and "Jesse James Bolero" came from McAloon's desire to write something Presley might have chosen to record. He felt the singer might have identified with the American outlaw Jesse James and "the pathetic story of a young life wasted". The two songs draw a parallel between the lives and early deaths of the two figures; McAloon felt both "lived a certain kind of life, and maybe envisaged a better end to it than what happened". Jesse was the name of Elvis's stillborn twin brother, another link identified by McAloon. He considered the genre of bolero fitting as it is "a stately dance, but a stately dance going nowhere". "Moon Dog" imagines Colonel Tom Parker staging Presley's surprise comeback concert on the moon ("Guess who's on the moon / Up there a flag will fly for mom and apple pie"). The track samples applause from one of Presley's concerts.

=== Tracks 10–14 (Love songs) ===
Tracks ten through fourteen broadly form a sequence of love songs. The upbeat "All the World Loves Lovers" concerns a new relationship, with an ambiguous tone influenced by the lyrics of Stephen Sondheim. McAloon expressed a desire to hear the song covered by Frank Sinatra. "All Boys Believe Anything" consists solely of repeated variations of its title, which forms a backronym of ABBA. Several reviewers have compared the song to musical theatre.

Described as a "stop-start pop track with flourishes of brass", "The Ice Maiden" is about ABBA member Agnetha Fältskog. Having been struck by the Swedish pop group's "frosty glamour" as a teenager, McAloon sought to emulate ABBA's "stiff" lyrical style, incorporating lines such as "welcome to the glow of high octane affairs" and "standing on the boulevard, you wish to know my name". "Paris Smith" was inspired by Wendy Smith's remark that, if she had a child, she would give it an incongruous first name to contrast her surname; her choice for a girl was Paris. The lyrics address a child in what McAloon described as "an attempt to exorcise my fears for the future". The sparse arrangement features a Dimension D chorus effect on the lead vocal, carried over from the demo recording.

"The Wedding March" explores marriage, with lyrics describing matrimony as "one dance whose steps I never could learn". McAloon preferred the demo to the studio recording and characterized the song as "lyrically quite hard" despite its mellow musical backing and backing vocals compared to Huey, Dewey, and Louie.

=== Tracks 15–19 (Death and fate) ===
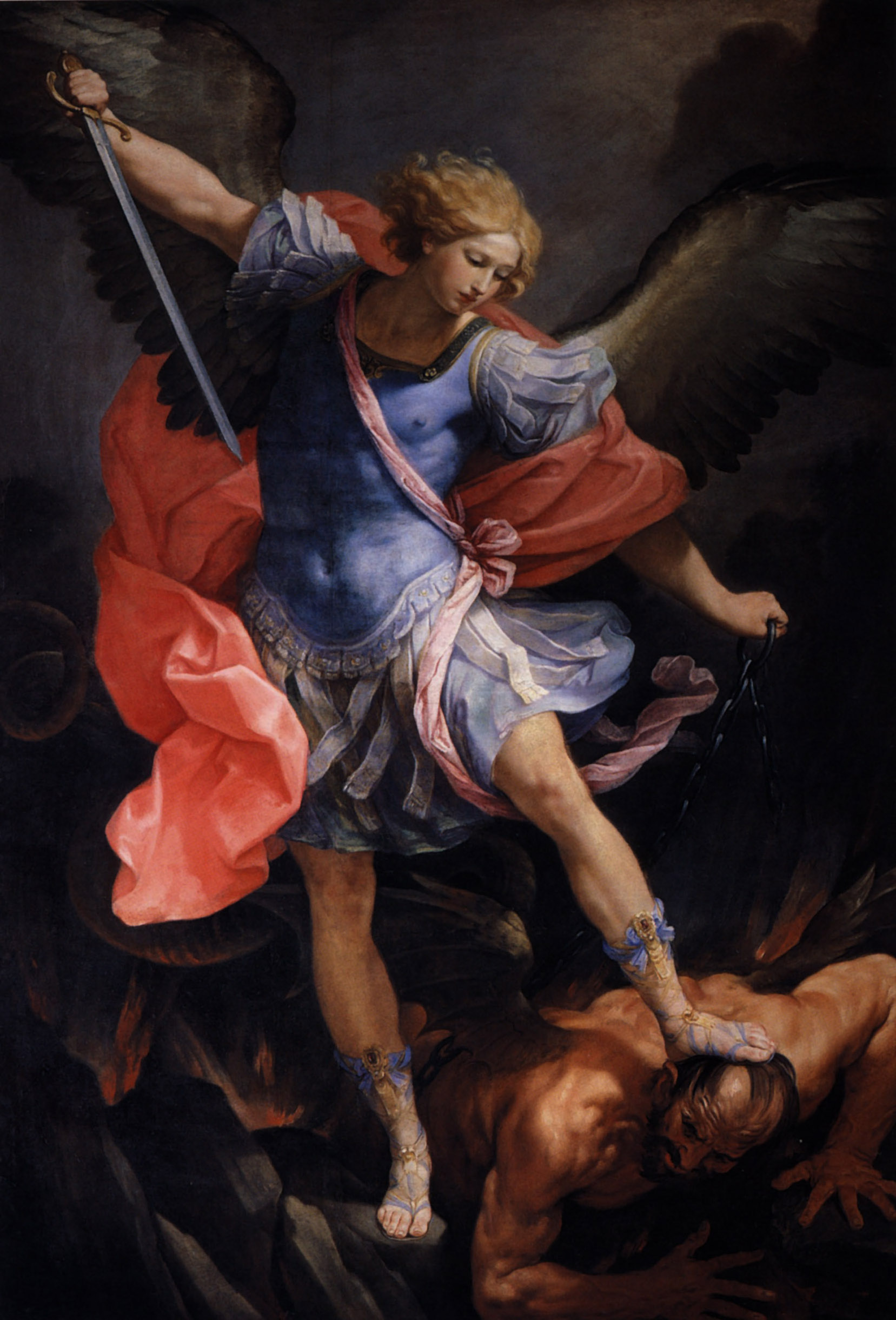
"Michael" imagines Satan asking the archangel Michael to help him get back into Heaven

Dubbed "death and fate" in several interviews, McAloon described the album's last five tracks as "a section on the modern way of death" that deals with "fundamental questions". Stuart Maconie has described the suite as "a rosary of agnostic doubt and weirdly uplifting musings on death" that "may be the most intelligent take on spiritual matters that modern pop has produced." Three of the tracks – "One of the Broken", "Mercy" and "Doo Wop in Harlem" – were written by McAloon in a flash of inspiration whilst he was waiting for a reel-to-reel tape to rewind.

McAloon considered "One of the Broken" among his best compositions. The country-influenced song is written from the perspective of God; its first verse begins "Hi, this is God here". Described by journalist Martin Townsend as a dreamy blues, "One of the Broken" has the creator urging the faithful to help others rather that sing any "hymn of devotion". In contrast, "Michael" is sung from the perspective of a regretful Satan wishing to get back into heaven and surprising the archangel Michael by requesting help on writing a letter to God. The song features a more modern and intense arrangement than "One of the Broken", creating an intentional sense of opposition between God and the Devil. According to Adam Mason of PopMatters, "Michael" is marked by a "gloriously sinister synth texture worthy of Depeche Mode". "Mercy" is the album's shortest track, performed solo by McAloon on acoustic guitar. It can be read as both a further plea from Satan or as a love song. The album's last two tracks directly concern death. "Scarlet Nights" is about someone waiting to die. Musically, the song combines a bouncy disco-influenced rhythm with a solemn church organ. "Doo Wop in Harlem" addresses a departed friend ("If there ain't a heaven that holds you tonight, they never sang doo wop in Harlem"). With its sparse arrangement utilising soul music-styled harmonies, McAloon considered the song "perfect for Ray Charles".

== Release ==
Jordan: The Comeback was issued on 28 August 1990 by Kitchenware Records and CBS. Its liner notes dedicate the album to Dolby and manager Keith Armstrong and carry a lighthearted special thanks to "the staff of Rollmo Studios for their pioneering use of the Zorrophonic™ recording process". (Note: The word rollmo had previously appeared on the back cover of From Langley Park to Memphis underneath a picture of a matchstick effigy of Bruce Springsteen.) The album reached number 7 on the UK Albums Chart, ultimately spending a total of 17 weeks on the chart. It was certified gold by the British Phonographic Industry in November 1990. On the European Top 100 Albums chart, it peaked at number 31. The album was extensively promoted in the UK, with features appearing in national newspapers including The Daily Telegraph and The Guardian and a profile of the band on BBC2's Rapido. In October, the band embarked on a UK tour in support of the album, breaking four years of live inactivity. The album was nominated for Brit Award for British Album of the Year at the 1991 Brit Awards, losing to George Michael's Listen Without Prejudice Vol. 1.

Two singles and an EP were released from the album. The band promoted the lead single "Looking for Atlantis" with a performance on the BBC1 talk show Wogan on 20 August 1990, but it failed make the top 40 on the UK Singles Chart, reaching number 51. "We Let the Stars Go" was issued as the album's second single; despite being BBC Radio 1's "Record of the Week" for the week beginning 8 October 1990, it peaked at number 50. (Note: Writing in Music Week in December 1990, record executive Andrew Lauder commented "there are so many good tracks on [Jordan: The Comeback], although I don't think they've picked the right single off it yet".) Issued on 24 December 1990, Jordan: The EP – featuring "One of the Broken", "Jordan: The Comeback", "Carnival 2000" and "The Ice Maiden" – fared a little better than its predecessors, reaching number 35. In September 1992, a revised mix of "All the World Loves Lovers" received single release in support of A Life of Surprises: The Best of Prefab Sprout, peaking at number 61.

== Critical reception ==
Professional ratings
Review scores
Source	Rating
AllMusic	4.5/5 stars
Entertainment Weekly	B+
Mojo	4/5 stars
NME	9/10
Pitchfork	8.8/10
Q	4/5 stars
The Rolling Stone Album Guide	4/5 stars
Select	4/5
Sounds	4.5/5 stars
Vox	10/10

Jordan: The Comeback garnered widespread acclaim upon release. Stuart Maconie of NME described the album as "riding a thematic railroad from nuggets of pure pop philosophy to weighty matters of the soul". Comparing the album's ambition to "other great pop jamborees from Sign o' the Times to the White Album", Maconie commented "to say it's the pop triumph of the year is to damn it with faint praise". David Wild of Rolling Stone said, "If Brian Wilson at the height of his creative powers had spent a year in the studio working up a concept album about love, God and Elvis, the result might have sounded like Jordan: The Comeback. Simon Reynolds of Melody Maker considered the album the band's best since Steve McQueen, praising it as "exquisite, sumptuous, marvellously intricate, angelically forceful". Record Mirror praised what it called "a masterly collection of 19 richly emotive songs". (Note: Reynolds declared of Jordan: "No record has sung inside me more insidiously, more irrepressibly this year, apart from Ultra Vivid Scene's Joy".) The Washington Post's Joe Brown praised the album's "smart lyrics, buoyant melodies and a pure pop charm the likes of which we haven't heard since the Beatles, or at least Elton John". Q reviewer Lloyd Bradley was most impressed by how the album "fills every nook and cranny with sounds" without overshadowing its songs' core rhythms and melodies. Ira Robbins of Entertainment Weekly commented "Those accustomed to musical junk food may find Jordan: The Comeback too subtle and complex at first, but this airy delicacy is a taste worth acquiring."

In lists of the year's best albums, Jordan: The Comeback was ranked third by Mark Woodruff of Spin and 23rd by NME. Ranking the album 27th, Melody Maker added: "If you aren't seduced by one of these 19 tracks, you don't like music". Among retrospective reviews, Jason Ankeny of AllMusic called it "Prefab Sprout's largely successful attempt to embrace the breadth of popular music", adding: "Over the course of no less than 19 tracks, McAloon chases his twin preoccupations of religion and celebrity, creating a loose thematic canvas perfect for his expanding musical palette". Trouser Press deemed the album "remarkably dense, intensely rewarding listening". In 1995, Q included Jordan in its publication "In Our Lifetime: Q's 100 Best Albums 1986–94", a list compiled to celebrate its 100th issue. Tom Ewing of Freaky Trigger ranked the record at number 77 in a 1999 list of his favourite albums of the 1990s.

Writing in 2007, BBC Music's Chris Jones felt the album's richness left listeners "somewhat over-satiated" and considered "We Let the Stars Go" and "All the World Loves Lovers" to come "uncomfortably close to cloying". He concluded "like George Gershwin transported into Brian Wilson's sandbox, Jordan is equal parts passionate, philosophical and preposterous". Upon its reissue in 2019, Danny Eccleston of Mojo referred to Jordan as Prefab Sprout's "sprawling opus" and said that its "gospel moves sound even better" in light of the renewed popularity of "'80s soul productions" while Adam Mason of PopMatters praised McAloon's ability "to plunge into any musical genre he pleases and emerge with a stunning melody". Pitchfork's Sam Sodomsky declared the album "a work so layered that, decades on, it still seems to hold new secrets" and singled out "Wild Horses" as "a romantic fantasy whose sleek arrangement still sounds fresh". In 2022, Pitchfork ranked the album 131 in their list "The 150 Best Albums of the 1990s".

== Aftermath and legacy ==
Following the album's release, McAloon worked on several similarly ambitious projects. He planned to follow up Jordan with Let's Change the World with Music, an album with religious themes that further reflected the influence of gospel music. After the completed demo tape received a muted reception from Sony in 1993, McAloon expanded the concept of one of its songs into Earth, the Story So Far, a concept album featuring songs about Adam and Eve and Neil Armstrong. McAloon worked on Earth for two years before abandoning it, fearing it would be too long and expensive for release. Other prospective Prefab Sprout projects devised during this period include Behind The Veil, based on the life of Michael Jackson, a romantic album named Knights in Armour and a collection of spiritual compositions titled The Atomic Hymn Book. The ultimate follow-up to Jordan became Andromeda Heights (1997), largely made up of songs written for previous conceptual projects. McAloon's Let's Change the World with Music demos were eventually released as Prefab Sprout's eighth studio album in 2009.

Jordan: The Comeback has continued to receive praise and has been described as Prefab Sprout's "ultimate fan favourite". "Jordan: The Comeback" and "One of the Broken" were among the ten tracks listed in NME's "Alternative Best of Prefab Sprout" in 1992. In a 2019 interview for Pitchfork, Alexis Taylor of Hot Chip named "Wild Horses" the song he wished he'd written, considering the song's loop-based arrangement modern and likening it to Prince's Diamonds and Pearls (1991). The song was sampled by Star Slinger for "Extra Time" in 2010 and covered by American singer-songwriter Natalie Prass in 2018.

A remastered edition of the album, overseen by Paddy and Martin McAloon, was issued by Sony Music on 27 September 2019. Originally released on vinyl as a single album, the 2019 vinyl issue afforded Jordan: The Comeback double album status with its sides corresponding to the four thematic sections. Paddy McAloon stated he was still proud of the album upon its reissue, describing it as "a solid piece of work".

== Track listing ==
All tracks are written by Paddy McAloon.

No.	Title	Length
1.	"Looking for Atlantis"	4:03
2.	"Wild Horses"	3:44
3.	"Machine Gun Ibiza"	3:43
4.	"We Let the Stars Go"	3:39
5.	"Carnival 2000"	3:23
6.	"Jordan: The Comeback"	4:13
7.	"Jesse James Symphony"	2:15
8.	"Jesse James Bolero"	4:10
9.	"Moon Dog"	4:12
10.	"All the World Loves Lovers"	3:50
11.	"All Boys Believe Anything"	1:34
12.	"The Ice Maiden"	3:19
13.	"Paris Smith"	2:55
14.	"The Wedding March"	2:50
15.	"One of the Broken"	3:55
16.	"Michael"	3:02
17.	"Mercy"	1:23
18.	"Scarlet Nights"	4:17
19.	"Doo Wop in Harlem"	3:44

== Personnel ==
Credits adapted from liner notes.

Prefab Sprout

- Paddy McAloon
- Martin McAloon
- Wendy Smith
- Neil Conti

Additional musicians

- Luís Jardim – percussion
- Judd Lander – harmonica (on "Looking for Atlantis")
- Jenny Agutter – spoken word (on "Wild Horses")
- The Phantom Horns – horns (on "Carnival 2000")

Technical personnel

- Thomas Dolby – production
- Paul Gomersall – recording
- Eric Calvi – mixing
- Paul Cuddeford – engineering assistance
- Karen White – engineering assistance
- Adrian Moore – engineering assistance
- Charlie Smith – engineering assistance
- Derek McCartney – engineering assistance
- Chris Puram – engineering assistance
- Mark Williams – engineering assistance
- Bernie Grundman – mastering
- Tim Young – mastering (on "Looking for Atlantis")
- Gerry Judah – cover concept, art direction
- Peter Barrett – cover design
- Andrew Biscomb – cover design
- Jonathan Lovekin – cover photography
- Trevor Hart – cover photography
- The Douglas Brothers – group portrait

== Charts ==
Chart (1990)	Peak position
Australian Albums (ARIA)	148
Dutch Albums (Album Top 100)	69
Swedish Albums (Sverigetopplistan)	17
UK Albums (Official Charts)	7
