= Protest Songs (album) =

Studio album by Prefab Sprout
- Released: 19 June 1989
- Recorded: September 1985; 1986 ("Life of Surprises")
- Studios: Lynx Studios, Newcastle upon Tyne
- Genre: Pop
- Length: 41:53
- Labels: Kitchenware; CBS
- Producer: Prefab Sprout

Prefab Sprout chronology
From Langley Park to Memphis (1988)	Protest Songs (1989)	Jordan: The Comeback (1990)

Protest Songs is the fourth studio album by English pop band Prefab Sprout. Recorded quickly and self-produced, the album features a minimal production style at odds with most of the band's work. Originally planned to be released in December 1985 as a quickfire follow-up to the band's critically acclaimed second album Steve McQueen, it was put on hold for commercial reasons and the band moved on to record 1988's From Langley Park to Memphis. The album was finally released by Kitchenware Records and CBS on 19 June 1989. Despite the band undertaking no promotional activities, the album peaked at number 18 on the UK Albums Chart.

== Background and recording ==
After the critical and commercial success of Prefab Sprout's Thomas Dolby-produced second album, 1985's Steve McQueen, Paddy McAloon felt under pressure to deliver a worthy follow-up. McAloon resolved to quickly record a new album using limited production values and to release it in late 1985, diffusing fans' expectations for a follow-up. McAloon liked the idea of a sparsely produced album to act as a balance to the polished production of Steve McQueen. Described by McAloon as "very down-to-earth" and a "black and white picture", the album was titled Protest Songs.

Protest Songs was self-produced, and recorded over 12 days in September at Lynx Studios, Newcastle upon Tyne. The sessions were relaxed, with drummer Neil Conti later recalling "we just basically had fun messing around with Paddy’s wonderful songs. Old school". Protest Songs was initially intended to have a limited release for concert-goers during the band's Winter 1985 UK tour. During the tour in October and November, flyers were distributed advertising the upcoming release, reading "Strictly LTD edition / For one week only / release date December 2nd 1985". The album's planned 1985 tracklisting, as rendered on promotional copies, was:

SIDE A

- "World Awake"
- "Wicked Things"
- "Horse Chimes"
- "Dublin"

SIDE B

- "Tiffanys"
- "Diana"
- "Talking Scarlet"
- "Till The Cows Come Home"
- "Pearly Gates"

"When Love Breaks Down", a single from Steve McQueen, became a transatlantic hit in October 1985. This caused the release of Protest Songs to be put on indefinite hold by CBS, who felt a new album would confuse new fans and stunt sales of Steve McQueen. As the album stayed in limbo, McAloon felt fans expectations for it heightened. The album was being extensively bootlegged across Europe at this time, a box of white label pressings of the original version having gone missing from CBS. By September 1986, Prefab Sprout had resolved to start anew on a fully-produced follow-up to Steve McQueen; the band considered rerecording songs from Protest Songs, but decided to leave the album untouched. The resultant album, From Langley Park to Memphis, was released in March 1988.

In a February 1988 interview, Paddy McAloon provided an update on Protest Songs, indicating it was still due for release: "CBS know they're on to a good thing, they know they've got a record that's been made for next to nothing that a lot of people are going to be interested in, even if they are the real diehard fans. It's not an embarrassment - OK, it’s not a CD-ish career move-type album, but they could still make a buck out of it".

== Composition ==
=== Musical and lyrical style ===
The album features a stripped down approach in contrast to Prefab Sprout's other work, leading to one reviewer to dub it the band's "own Basement Tapes". According to Q reviewer Phil Sutcliffe, the songs are "pretty, warm, user-friendly". McAloon felt the album was difficult to define as it was not recorded as a 4-track demo album like Bruce Springsteen's Nebraska, describing it as instead "mid-way between what we’ve always done and something slightly rougher". The album was named Protest Songs because the songs, though not overtly political, generally relate to daily existence more than most of Prefab Sprout's work. McAloon commented ahead of the album's release; "they’re not strictly protest songs as Bob Dylan or Billy Bragg would recognise them but somewhere in that field".

Several of the album's songs ("Dublin" "Wicked Things" "Pearly Gates") contain references to God and religious imagery, which was to become common in Prefab Sprout's work. McAloon is from a Catholic background, but describes himself as an agnostic "with a healthy interest in the mystical". He has said he considers religion a great subject for songwriting because it comes with a unique but widely-understood vocabulary and a poetic resonance.

=== Songs ===
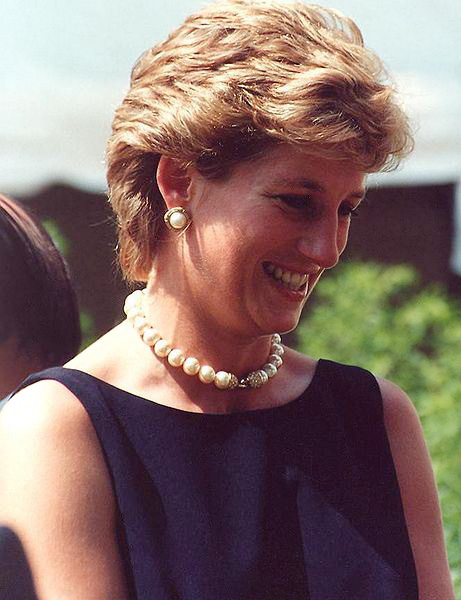
Diana, Princess of Wales is the subject of "Diana".

According to Stuart Maconie's NME review of Protest Songs, the opening track "The World Awake" "cartwheels across your living room, the kind of tune that makes you want to jump for joy and buy the world a drink, its chords dangling in the air like a string of pearls". Both "The World Awake" and the album's second track "Life of Surprises" were described as being in a "philosophical vein behind the up-and-running light soul sounds" by Q reviewer Phil Sutcliffe. "Life of Surprises" was not part of the original 1985 running order of Protest Songs; it dates from the demo sessions in Lynx Studios for From Langley Park to Memphis in late 1986. This recording was first released as a B-side on the single of "Nightingales" before its inclusion on Protest Songs. In his review of Protest Songs, Stuart Maconie considered the song to be a potential hit single. Maconie was proven right in 1992 when the song gave its name to Prefab Sprout's first best of collection, A Life of Surprises: The Best of Prefab Sprout and was released as a single to promote it. "Life of Surprises" became one of the band's greatest successes on the UK Singles Chart, peaking at number 24. "Wicked Things" was one of the ten tracks listed in NME's "Alternative Best of Prefab Sprout" in 1992. "Dublin", which features only McAloon accompanying himself on acoustic guitar, is about the Troubles. McAloon maintained in several interviews that Steve McQueen would have been improved had "Dublin" been included on it, saying; "We could have had the ultimate killer album, a record beyond all other records".

"Tiffanys" is among the earliest-written Prefab Sprout songs, dating to the band's formation in 1977. It is about Newcastle nightclub Tiffany's, described by McAloon as "very seedy". The band performed in the venue's function room in 1983. "Tiffanys" was frequently included in the band's setlists in the years leading up to its 1985 recording. "Diana" was written in 1982. A regular number in the band's concerts, "Diana" was considered for inclusion on Swoon, and at one time was planned to be released as a non-album single in Autumn 1984. It is the second of two tracks on Protest Songs that had previously been released; an earlier recording (produced by Hal Remingto) was the B-side of "When Love Breaks Down" in 1984. "Diana" is about the deification of Diana, Princess of Wales. McAloon elaborated in a 1984 interview "It’s really about the Daily Mail, the way they wrote about her. The burden she had". "Talking Scarlet", which concerns forbidden lust, lent its name to the band's official fan club newsletters. "Till the Cows Come Home" is about a provincial place, and McAloon considered it one of the album's best songs. Like "Dublin", McAloon felt the song would've elevated Steve McQueen had it been included. Stuart Maconie's Protest Songs review said the song "reflects darkly on the impoverished North East". The album's closer "Pearly Gates" was among the ten tracks listed in NME's "Alternative Best of Prefab Sprout" in 1992. Maconie felt the song "goes to places most pop records have never heard of; quaint and strangely moving with all the emotive power of a half-remembered hymn from schooldays". The song has been described as a precursor to the final tracks on the band's next album, Jordan: The Comeback, which contains themes of mortality, religion and the afterlife.

== Release ==
The eventual release of Protest Songs was announced by Kitchenware in March 1989, originally provisionally set for a May date. The album was finally issued on 19 June 1989, 15 months after From Langley Park to Memphis and nearly four years on from its original intended release date. Prefab Sprout undertook no promotion for Protest Songs; the album's press release noted "the band are currently in the studio recording their brand new album, Jordan: The Comeback". Despite the lack of publicity, the album reached number 18 on the UK Albums Chart. It was certified silver by the British Phonographic Industry in July 1989.

== Critical reception ==
Professional ratings
Review scores
Source	Rating
AllMusic	4/5 stars
Encyclopedia of Popular Music	3/5 stars
Hi-Fi News & Record Review	B:2
NME	9/10 stars
Record Mirror	4/5 stars
Sputnikmusic	4.5/5 stars
Select	5/5 stars

Among contemporary reviews, Stuart Maconie of the NME considered the album "incredible", adding "Ten songs, by turns sparkling and opaque, carefree and weighty, that confirm the Sprouts as a band, and Paddy as a writer, as amongst the handful of treasures we have". Phil Sutcliffe of Q described Protest Songs as "their most durable collection to date" but also considered it "an odd combination of modesty and overweaning ambition – extremes successfully moderated on Langley Park". Writing in Spin, Robin Reinhardt declared Protest Songs "a record only the most intellectual or most delirious can understand. Lush, airy harmonies that whisper erratic, ambiguous lyrics make the music seem like an afterthought". Nick Robinson, reviewer of British music newspaper Music Week, considered that "college book poetry and passive pop songs have a distinct charm". The Irish Independent opined "McAloon's songwriting skill is enhanced by the sparseness of the surrounding soundscapes", and recommended the album to anyone who may have previously found the band too convoluted or "clever". The chorus of "Dublin" ("Dublin Dublin, home of pretty Coleens/Dublin Dublin, nurse of such bitter dreams") was derided in some Irish reviews. The Sunday Tribune's Michael Ross described the lyrics as "daft" while Ferdia MacAnna of Dublin's Evening Herald commented "Coleens? Begorragh, Paddy, you're a bit of a cute hoor".

Among retrospective reviews, AllMusic critic Jason Ankeny gave the album 4 stars out of 5, saying: "It's a wonderful record, but perhaps too close in sound and spirit to Steve McQueen for comfort". He added: "By no means a lost masterpiece, it's still an essential piece of the puzzle." Sputnikmusic's Aaron W. considered the album undervalued, describing it as a "proper sequel" to Steve McQueen and "arguably just as good".

== Legacy ==
Reflecting on Protest Songs in 1997, Paddy McAloon commented; "The main idea behind Protest Songs was the deconstruction of pop in its entirety. It had to be an album gaunt, humble, essential. An approach that, in retrospect, I think was wrong. By working a bit on songs like "Horsechimes" you could pull off a lot more." Neil Conti considered his drumming performances on the album some of his best, saying in 2014: "I will stand by that record for as long as I live. It’s one of the few records I have done where I can bear to listen without flinching from hearing that bit that I could’ve done better". A remastered edition of the album, overseen by Paddy and Martin McAloon, was issued by Sony Music on 25 October 2019.

== Track listing ==
All tracks are written by Paddy McAloon.

No.	Title	Length
1.	"The World Awake"	4:26
2.	"Life of Surprises"	4:08
3.	"Horsechimes"	4:24
4.	"Wicked Things"	3:11
5.	"Dublin"	3:42
6.	"Tiffanys"	3:50
7.	"Diana"	4:10
8.	"Talking Scarlet"	4:34
9.	"'Til the Cows Come Home"	4:12
10.	"Pearly Gates"	5:28

Note: The back covers of the original vinyl, CD and cassette releases list track 8 as "Talking Scarlet", but the labels list it as "Talkin Scarlet". The back covers also list track 9 as "'Til the Cows Come Home" whereas the labels list it as "'Till the Cows Come Home", with an extra L.

== Personnel ==
Credits adapted from liner notes.

- Prefab Sprout – production
- Richard Digby Smith – recording, mixing
- Lance Phillips – mixing (on "Life of Surprises")
- Michael H. Brauer – remixing (on "Dublin" and "Pearly Gates")
- Lawrence J. Bogle – photography

== Charts ==
Chart	Peak position
UK Albums (OCC)	18
