= Goodbye Lucille Number 1 =

1986 song by Prefab Sprout

"Johnny Johnny"

Single by Prefab Sprout

from the album Steve McQueen
- Released: January 1986
- Recorded: 1984–85
- Genre: Sophisti-pop; post-punk; new wave; indie pop
- Length: 4:29 (album version); 3:56 (single edit)
- Label: Kitchenware
- Songwriter: Paddy McAloon
- Producer: Thomas Dolby

Prefab Sprout singles chronology
"Appetite" (1985)	"Johnny Johnny" (1986)	"Cars and Girls" (1988)

"Goodbye Lucille #1" is a song by English pop band Prefab Sprout, released as a single under the title "Johnny Johnny" by Kitchenware Records in January 1986. It was the final single taken from their album Steve McQueen. The single failed to reach the top 40 of the UK Singles Chart, reaching a peak of number 64 over three weeks on the chart.

== Composition and recording ==
The song was written in 1979. Paddy McAloon heard "Walking on the Moon" by The Police while ill in bed, and felt inspired by its simplicity. McAloon used "Johnny", considering it "the most clichéd rock 'n' roll word ever used", and filled the song's verses with more unusual lyrics such as "You're still in love with Hayley Mills". McAloon describes the song's lyrics as "an older hand offering advice to a love torn boy who’s been dumped by his girlfriend". The song originally played live by Prefab Sprout's initial three-piece lineup (Paddy McAloon, Martin McAloon, Michael Salmon) at a faster tempo than the eventual recording. Martin McAloon says the song was conceived as a waltz, recalling "we sat round the piano, and we all sang it with our friends".

The song's unusual title is a remnant from an idea of McAloon to record an album of 9 tracks all with the same title, each one numbered differently. Martin McAloon remembered in 2007 "Three or four of them were piano versions and were quite beautiful, but we have no record of them, and I’m not sure if Paddy could remember them." At one time "Walk On", the B-side to "The Devil Has All the Best Tunes", was "Goodbye Lucille #7", with the chorus of "Walk on, walk on" being replaced with "Goodbye, Lucille: that’s all I feel".

The song was left off the band's debut album Swoon as Paddy McAloon wanted the album to feature his more complex material. When Thomas Dolby began working with Prefab Sprout, McAloon played him a number of songs without telling him what period they belonged to. McAloon felt that because he had played the songs live so many times, he could no longer be objective about them. "Goodbye Lucille #1" is one of three songs included on Steve McQueen dating to the band's initial lineup, the others being "Faron Young" and "Bonny". According to Ian Pye of Melody Maker, "Goodbye Lucille #1" features "a beautifully haunting vocal from Wendy Smith".

== Release ==
"Goodbye Lucille #1" was retitled "Johnny Johnny" for release as the final single from "Steve McQueen" in January 1986. A music video was produced for the song. The video initially featured extracts from John Schlesinger's 1962 film A Kind of Loving interspersed with shots of the band, but these extracts were removed in later releases. The band performed the song on BBC2's The Old Grey Whistle Test on 12 December 1985 and on Channel 4's The Tube on 7 February 1986. The single failed to reach the top 40 of the UK Singles Chart, reaching a peak of number 64 over three weeks on the chart.

Three new Prefab Sprout songs were released as B-sides to "Johnny Johnny"; "Wigs", "The Guest Who Stayed Forever" and "Old Spoonface Is Back" were written in the studio. Paddy McAloon explained in a 1988 interview "I wanted to do my fans a favour by including bonus tracks. That’s why I went to the studio without songs, I wrote them there, which I usually never do".

== Reception and legacy ==
In 2007, Daryl Easlea of Record Collector dubbed "Goodbye Lucille #1" the standout track of Steve McQueen. Reviewing "Steve McQueen" in 2019, Rik Flynn of Classic Pop noted the song's "typically magnificent, yet slightly wonky hook" and called it "another sparkling example of McAloon’s ever-creative handling of pop". Iggy Pop once told McAloon he intended to cover the song. The song remained a staple of the band's setlist up to their final live performances in 2000. In 2006, Paddy McAloon rerecorded the song in a solo acoustic arrangement for the expanded 2007 reissue of Steve McQueen.

== Track listings ==
=== 7" vinyl single ===
Side 1

1. "Johnny Johnny (Edit)"

Side 2

1. "Wigs"

=== 12" vinyl single ===
Side 1

1. "Johnny Johnny (Full Version)"

Side 2

1. "Wigs"
2. "The Guest Who Stayed Forever"
3. "Old Spoonface Is Back"
