= From Langley Park to Memphis =

Studio album by Prefab Sprout
- Released: 14 March 1988
- Genre: Sophisti-pop
- Length: 45:32
- Label: Kitchenware
- Producer: Thomas Dolby, Jon Kelly, Paddy McAloon, Andy Richards

Prefab Sprout chronology
Steve McQueen (1985)	From Langley Park to Memphis (1988)	Protest Songs (1989)

Singles from From Langley Park to Memphis
- 1. "Cars and Girls" Released: February 1988; 2. "The King of Rock 'n' Roll" Released: March 1988; 3. "Hey Manhattan!" Released: July 1988; 4. "Nightingales" Released: November 1988; 5. "The Golden Calf" Released: February 1989

From Langley Park to Memphis is the third studio album by English pop band Prefab Sprout. It was released by Kitchenware Records on 14 March 1988. It peaked at number five on the UK Albums Chart, the highest position for any studio album released by the band. Recorded in Newcastle, London and Los Angeles, it has a more polished and commercial sound than their earlier releases, and features several guest stars including Stevie Wonder and Pete Townshend. The album's simpler songs, big productions and straightforward cover photo reflect frontman Paddy McAloon's wish for it to be a more universal work than their more cerebral earlier work.

The album received mixed reviews upon release with several criticising the elaborate production style, while McAloon's songwriting received praise. The album's commercial performance was bolstered by the success of its single "The King of Rock 'n' Roll", which became the band's only top 10 hit on the UK Singles Chart when it peaked at No. 7. The four other singles released from the album, "Cars and Girls", "Hey Manhattan!", "Nightingales" and "The Golden Calf", failed to make the top 40.

== Background and recording ==
After the critical and commercial success of Prefab Sprout's Thomas Dolby-produced second album, 1985's Steve McQueen, Paddy McAloon felt under pressure to deliver a worthy follow-up. McAloon resolved to quickly record and release a new album using limited production values. Titled Protest Songs, the album was recorded over two weeks in Newcastle and intended for a limited release in late 1985. However, "When Love Breaks Down", a single from Steve McQueen, became a transatlantic hit in October 1985, and Protest Songs was put on hold by CBS so as not to confuse new fans and stunt sales of Steve McQueen.

Starting work on a new follow-up to Steve McQueen in 1987, the band considered rerecording songs from Protest Songs, but decided to leave the album untouched and start anew. (Note: Protest Songs was finally released in June 1989, 15 months after From Langley Park to Memphis.) From Langley Park to Memphis was recorded sporadically over a year in Newcastle, London and Los Angeles. Steve McQueen producer Thomas Dolby was unable to commit to producing the entire album due to his work on the soundtrack for George Lucas's Howard the Duck, ultimately a critical and commercial flop. Instead, Dolby produced the four tracks he liked the most out of 16 demos sent to him by McAloon. McAloon produced most of the remaining tracks in collaboration with Jon Kelly, while Andy Richards took Kelly's place for "Hey Manhattan!" and "The Golden Calf" was produced by McAloon alone. McAloon did not want the album's sound to be as uniform as Steve McQueen's, and initially planned to use 10 different producers. This was ultimately deemed a logistical impossibility. The album features guest appearances from Pete Townshend, Stevie Wonder and the Andraé Crouch singers – McAloon felt the latter two's contributions proved the band's music was not exclusively British.

== Composition ==
=== Musical and lyrical style ===
In contrast to Prefab Sprout's previous work, most of the album's songs were written on keyboard and the album's sound has been described as "sonically soft". McAloon's home recording and composing setup at the time included a Roland JX-3P, a Roland JX-10, a Yamaha DX7, an Ensoniq Mirage and a Casiotone. McAloon was most comfortable with the JX-3P for composing while a Fostex B16 was used for recording demos. He aimed to write more accessible songs than those on the band's earlier records, stating "I've realised that a good simple song is better than a half-successful complicated one." McAloon also sought to expand the band's sound to incorporate his favourite elements of popular music, including gospel music and Broadway, and to reach an audience "seduced by the overall glamour and romanticism". According to Sam Sodomsky of Pitchfork, From Langley Park to Memphis includes an eclectic mix of styles including alternative rock ("The Golden Calf"), standards ("Nightingales") and Broadway-style singalong ("Hey Manhattan!"). Several songs feature American themes, reflected in the album's title. McAloon explained in a 1988 interview that he often drew inspiration from America for his songs because "America remains an inexhaustible source of myths and the extreme."

=== Songs ===
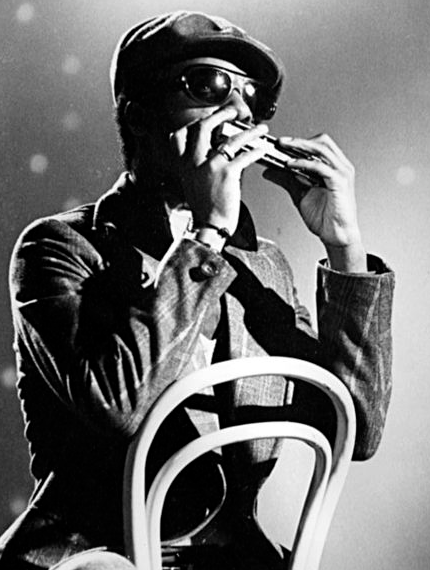
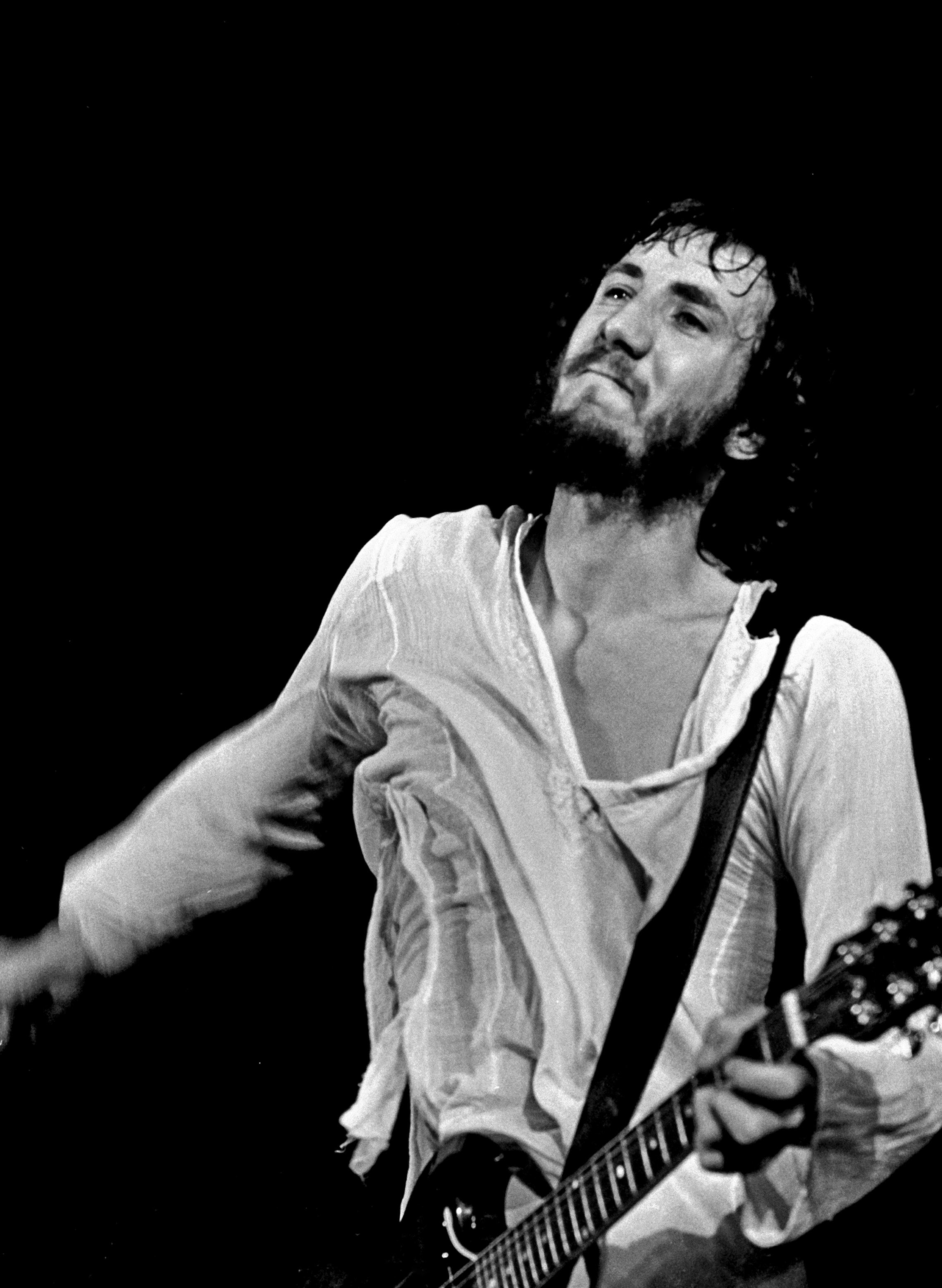
Stevie Wonder and Pete Townshend appear on the album

Of the album's ten tracks, Thomas Dolby produced "The King of Rock 'n' Roll", "I Remember That", "Knock on Wood" and "The Venus Of The Soup Kitchen". "The King of Rock 'n' Roll" was written in 1985. The lyrics are written from the perspective of a washed-up singer who was a one-hit wonder in the 1950s with a novelty song featuring the chorus "Hot dog, jumping frog, Albuquerque". McAloon was aware of the song's commercial potential early on, and felt it would surprise fans used to the band's earlier, more cerebral material. Musically, "I Remember That" is, according to Nils Johansson of NSD, a gospel ballad. McAloon considered the song's nostalgic mood a lighter lyrical theme than that of a love song, with the title phrase being "close to romanticism without actually being sloppy". He tried to sing the song with a "lightness of feeling". In a 1997 interview, McAloon named "I Remember That" "the best song I've ever written".

"Knock on Wood" has been described by David Stubbs of Melody Maker as a "song about breakdown, how the man who jilts will himself be jilted, couched in a beautifully adhesive reggae lilt." "The Venus of the Soup Kitchen" closes the album. McAloon wanted the song's melody to be far-reaching and resonant, with the chorus expressing "the emotional participation of everyone listening to it". He described the song's meaning in a 1988 interview "Venus travels along the road from Langley Park to Memphis. I have imagined it full of troubled people, people who need a Venus who can cook soup for them." The song features the Andraé Crouch Singers, who recorded their contribution in Stevie Wonder's studio in Los Angeles.

Jon Kelly produced "Cars and Girls", "Enchanted", "Nightingales" and "Nancy (Let Your Hair Down for Me)". "Cars and Girls" was written in 1985, and played by the band during live appearances that year. Lyrically, the song is a comment on Bruce Springsteen's use of romantic metaphors in his songs. McAloon has denied that the song indicates a personal distaste for Springsteen, telling NME "I think a lot of his audience get into him on a patriotic level that he doesn't intend. They misinterpret him, their enjoyment of him is inaccurate, all very imperialist American. I wanted to write a song about someone who was thick white trash, listening to Springsteen, and saying 'But our lives aren't like that'." Paddy McAloon has described "Enchanted" as being about "finding something to be excited about, year after year". Thomas Dolby suggested Prince should produce the track, but the album's sound engineer David Leonard failed to find Prince at Sunset Sound Recorders to approach him. McAloon sampled the opening bass run of Glen Campbell's recording of "Wichita Lineman" for the song's bassline.

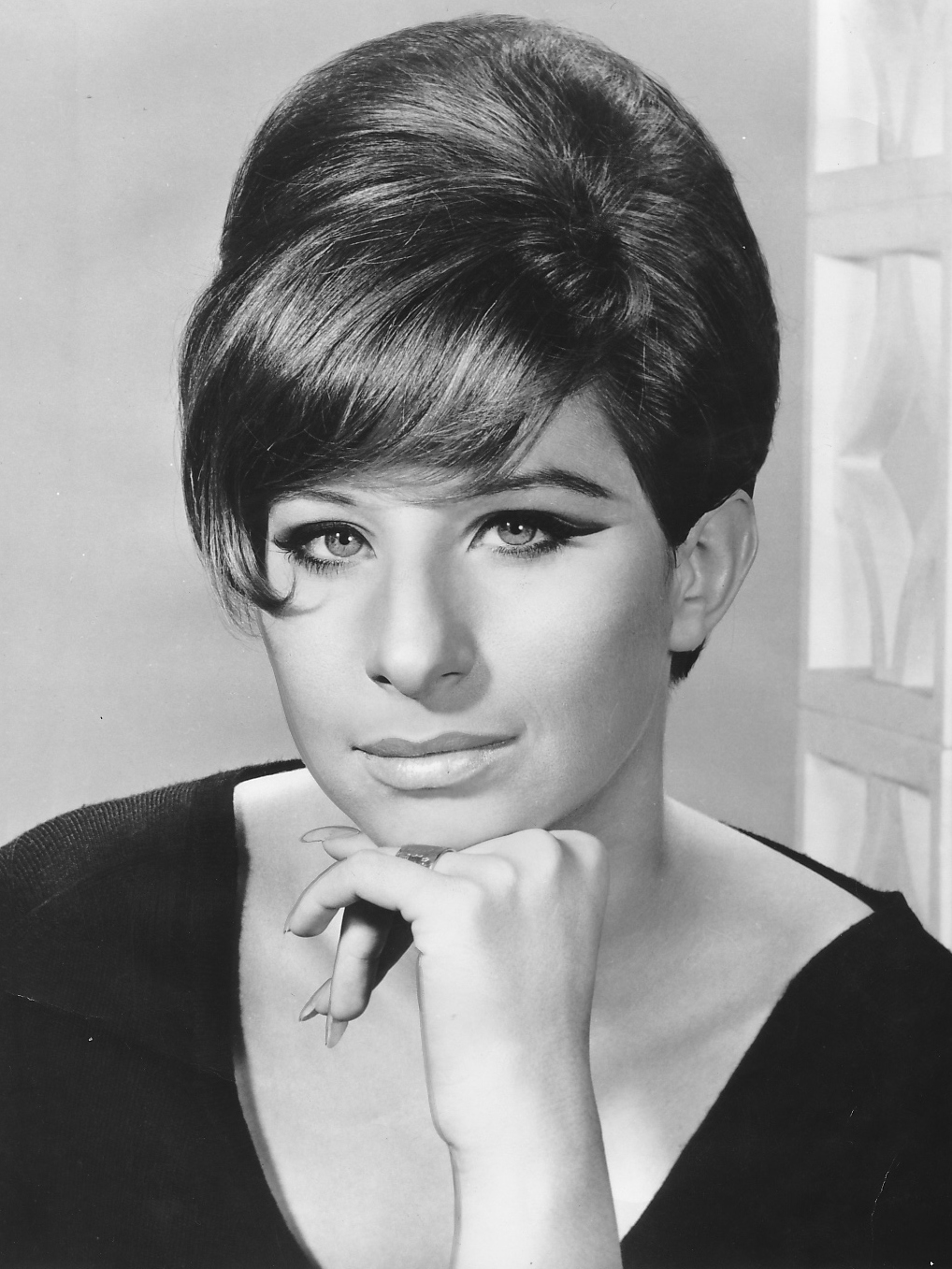
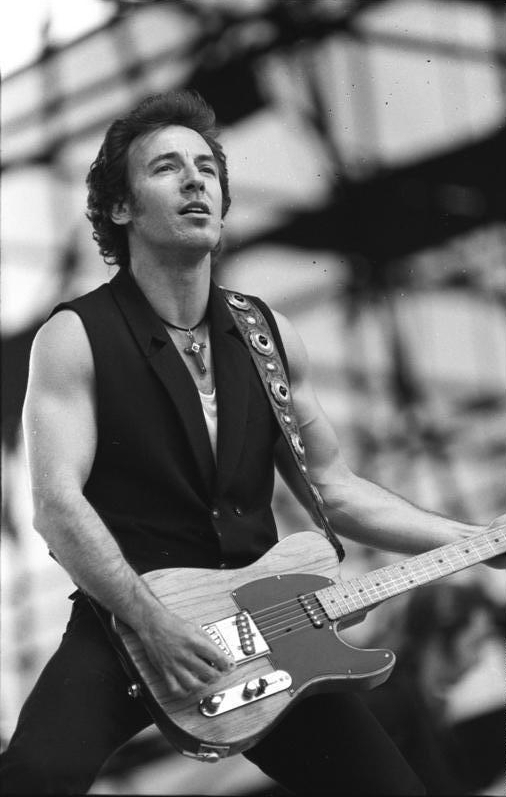
Barbra Streisand and Bruce Springsteen inspired songs on the album

McAloon wrote "Nightingales" with Barbra Streisand – whose The Broadway Album he was engrossed by – in mind. He considered it as "the purest song" the band had recorded since "When Love Breaks Down". McAloon originally envisioned the song featuring a horn solo, but ultimately composed a complex harmonica solo and wrote a letter to Stevie Wonder asking for him to play it. Wonder hadn't heard of Prefab Sprout but nevertheless obliged, adding his own melodic lines to the song. McAloon would later describe his contribution as "so breathtakingly good and precise, even though he said himself it was quite complicated". McAloon has described "Nancy (Let Your Hair Down for Me)" as "a modern love story". The song is about a married couple who work together, with the wife being the husband's boss.

Andy Richards produced "Hey Manhattan!", a song McAloon wrote on piano. McAloon originally wanted an American, Isaac Hayes, to sing it. The proposed collaboration was quashed when Hayes' manager wanted more than was offered. The song is about an enthusiastic teenager who arrives in a big city, with the theme of dreams and ambitions. Pete Townshend provided acoustic guitar for the song during the mixing stage at his studio. McAloon was nervous about the song's production during recording, having not worked with Andy Richards before, but ultimately approved of his work. Nevertheless, he'd describe "Hey Manhattan!" as "the one song I'm dissatisfied with the way we realised it. It's pretty but it's a failure."

"The Golden Calf" was self-produced by Paddy McAloon. It is among the earliest-written songs Prefab Sprout have released, having been composed in 1977 when the band was a guitar-based trio who made what McAloon would describe as "heavy metal meeting disco". The Langley Park version felt "like doing a cover version" for McAloon due to the lapse of time, and he used a less breathy singing voice than usual on the track, something he felt Thomas Dolby would not have allowed and considered more in line with his vocals from Swoon. "The Golden Calf" has been described by Andreas Hub of Fachblatt as "a real rocker" and has garnered comparisons to the work of Pete Townshend, Marc Bolan and Del Amitri.

== Release ==
From Langley Park to Memphis was released by Kitchenware Records on 14 March 1988. The album's title comes from a line from "The Venus of the Soup Kitchen" - "Maybe it hurts your brothers too, from Langley Park to Memphis" - a lyric about universal emotions. Langley Park is a village in County Durham near where the band originated. Memphis was chosen as it was where Elvis Presley began his career. The title has been construed as a reference to Presley's album From Memphis to Vegas / From Vegas to Memphis. The album cover, designed by Nick Knight, is a straightforward image of the four band members, intended to reflect how the album is clearer and more direct than its predecessors. The album was Prefab Sprout's first to chart in the top 20, entering the UK Albums Chart at number 5 and remaining in the chart for 23 weeks. It remains the band's highest-charting studio album. It was certified gold by the British Phonographic Industry in April 1988. By 1997, From Langley Park to Memphis was estimated to have sold 330,000 units in the UK.

"Cars and Girls" was released as the album's lead single but failed to reach the top 40 of the UK Singles Chart, reaching a peak of number 44 over five weeks on the chart. Speaking in 1992, McAloon described himself as "shocked and stunned" at the song not being a hit, commenting "I woke up then and I’ve never had such high expectations since." In August 1988, the band were reported to have persuaded CBS to rerelease the single but this ultimately didn't happen. The second single "The King of Rock 'n' Roll" remains Prefab Sprout's greatest success in their native UK. Their only top ten hit, the song peaked at No. 7 and spent 11 weeks on the chart. The band promoted the single with performances of the song on Top Of The Pops and Wogan. McAloon would later point out the irony of a song about a one-hit wonder being his only top ten single. "Hey Manhattan!" was issued as the album's third single, reaching number 72, while its fourth "Nightingales" charted at number 78. Having been offered to American album-oriented rock radio stations by Epic in advance promotion of the album, "The Golden Calf" was the fifth and final single. It was promoted by the band with performances on the children's television programmes Going Live! and Get Fresh. It charted at number 82 in the UK. "I Remember That" was released as a single in 1993 to promote the compilation album A Life of Surprises: The Best of Prefab Sprout but failed to chart.

== Critical reception ==
Professional ratings
Review scores
Source	Rating
AllMusic	4/5 stars
NME	5/10
Pitchfork	8.6/10
Q	4/5 stars
Record Mirror	4 1/2/5
Rolling Stone	2/5 stars
The Rolling Stone Album Guide	4/5 stars
Smash Hits	6/10
Spin Alternative Record Guide	8/10
Uncut	8/10

From Langley Park to Memphis received mixed reviews. Rolling Stone's Peter Wilkinson described the album as "overreaching", elaborating "McAloon tries leavening disjointed talk with instrumental gimmickry. Songs built around McAloon's guitar are lost in a swirl of strings and the noodlings of no less than five engineers and four producers." In a contemporary review for Cashbox, the magazine gave the album a highly positive forecast, predicting that the record "should finally break the band at the U.S. mainstream level." The review described the release as a "strong collection," highlighting the inclusion of four tracks produced by Thomas Dolby, as well as the musical accompaniment contributed by Stevie Wonder on the song "Nightingales." Dave Rimmer of Q considered it "probably their best album yet" but found "The King of Rock 'n' Roll" "a mite irritating". He felt that "the only true duff part is the overblown imagery of "The Golden Calf"." NME's Len Brown was not enamoured with the album's production style, calling it "sickly" and "cluttered". He considered the album "a largely bland affair", but praised "Cars and Girls" and "Nancy (Let Your Hair Down for Me)". Creem's Kurt B. Riley was critical of the album, feeling that the songwriting was "done a great disservice by ill-fitting arrangements". Melody Maker's David Stubbs felt it was "less strong" than Steve McQueen but "more ambitious". Vogue's Barney Hoskyns commented "at least seven of its 10 songs are more accessible, more ravishingly beautiful than anything McAloon has written."

Both Record Mirror and Hot Press ranked the album number 5 in their "Albums of the Year" list. Additionally, the album was included in "Albums of the Year" lists in Q, and Rockdelux. Dave DiMartino of Billboard ranked the album his fifth favourite of the year, commenting "Paddy McAloon has seen the future of rock and roll – and has returned bearing the names of Jimmy Webb, Cole Porter and absolutely no songs about cars 'n' girls." In 1991, Melody Maker's Paul Lester described From Langley Park to Memphis as "a hyper-modern dazzling white pop LP that ranks alongside Dare, The Lexicon of Love and Colour by Numbers."

Among retrospective reviews, Jason Ankeny of AllMusic gave the "ambitious" album 4 stars out of 5, calling it "Prefab Sprout's spiritual journey into the heart of American culture", though he felt it paled in comparison to Steve McQueen. Writing in Italy's Ciao Magazine in 1990, Paolo Battigelli described it as a "not entirely convincing record" but added "Cars and Girls" confirmed McAloon as a composer with a rare talent, albeit one hiding himself behind allegories and tortuous references." Writing for Pitchfork upon the album's reissue in 2019, Sam Sodomsky considered the album as "catchy and complex" as its best known songs "The King of Rock 'n' Roll" and "Cars and Girls" and described the music as "colourful and hopeful and alive – everything seems to sparkle, right down to the glossy band photo on the album cover". "Nancy (Let Your Hair Down for Me)" was among the ten tracks listed in NME's "Alternative Best of Prefab Sprout" in 1992.

== Aftermath and legacy ==
The album's commercial success caused an uncomfortable level of recognition for Paddy McAloon, who would later recollect "I was asked for autographs, girls wanted to put their hands in my hair, touch me... ...the glamorous aspect of our music has always been for me a way of showing how we as individuals are the opposite of this glittering world." Despite demand from fans and CBS, Prefab Sprout did not tour the album as McAloon did not want to sacrifice what he described as "the best time of my life for writing", stating "I know that if I go on the road I'll just end up writing in the same way as everyone else."

In interviews surrounding the album's release, McAloon alluded to two new projects he was working on – a Christmas album called Total Snow and a musical about the fictional masked vigilante Zorro called Zorro the Fox. As of 2022, neither of these projects have materialised. Regarding "The King of Rock 'n' Roll", McAloon has described himself as "reconciled to being remembered for that song" and "aware that it's a bit like being known for "Yellow Submarine" rather than "Hey Jude"." A remastered edition of the album, overseen by Paddy and Martin McAloon, was issued by Sony Music on 27 September 2019.

== Track listing ==
All tracks are written by Paddy McAloon.

No.	Title	Length
1.	"The King of Rock 'n' Roll"	4:22
2.	"Cars and Girls"	4:25
3.	"I Remember That"	4:14
4.	"Enchanted"	3:47
5.	"Nightingales"	5:53
6.	"Hey Manhattan!"	4:45
7.	"Knock on Wood"	4:16
8.	"The Golden Calf"	5:06
9.	"Nancy (Let Your Hair Down for Me)"	4:02
10.	"The Venus of the Soup Kitchen"	4:29

== Personnel ==
Credits adapted from liner notes.

Prefab Sprout

- Neil Conti
- Martin McAloon
- Paddy McAloon
- Wendy Smith

Additional musicians

- Thomas Dolby – keyboards (1, 3, 7, 10)
- Gary Moberley – keyboards (2, 4, 5)
- Paul "Wix" Wickens – keyboards (2, 4, 5, 9)
- Andy Richards – keyboards (6)
- Luís Jardim – percussion (2, 4, 5, 6)
- Lenny Castro – percussion (10)
- Stevie Wonder – harmonica (5)
- Pete Townshend – acoustic guitar (6)
- The Andraé Crouch Singers – vocals (3, 10)
- Gavyn Wright – strings lead (5, 6, 9)
- Robin Smith – string arrangement, conduct (5, 9)
- John Altman – string arrangement, conduct (6)

Technical personnel

- Thomas Dolby – production (1, 3, 7, 10)
- Jon Kelly – production (2, 4, 5, 9)
- Paddy McAloon – production (2, 4, 5, 6, 8, 9)
- Andy Richards – production (6)
- David Leonard – mixing (1, 3, 7, 10)
- Richard Moakes – mixing (2, 4, 9)
- Mike Shipley – mixing (5)
- Tony Philips – mixing (6)
- Michael H. Brauer – mixing (8)
- Tim Young – mastering
- Stephen Male – design
- Nick Knight – photography

== Charts ==
=== Weekly ===
Chart (1988)	Peak position
Australia (Kent Music Report)	58
Dutch Albums (Album Top 100)	49
Italian Albums (FIMI)	9
New Zealand Albums (RMNZ)	34
Swedish Albums (Sverigetopplistan)	18
UK Albums (OCC)	5

=== Year-end ===
Chart (1988)	Position
European Albums (Music & Media)	98
Italian Albums (FIMI)	52
UK Albums (OCC)	87

== Certifications ==
Certifications for From Langley Park to Memphis
Region	Certification	Certified units/sales
France (SNEP)	Gold	100,000^{*}
Portugal (AFP)	Silver	10,000^{^}
^{*} Sales figures based on certification alone.^{^} Shipments figures based on certification alone.
