= Swoon (Prefab Sprout album) =

Studio album by Prefab Sprout
- Released: March 1984
- Recorded: 1983
- Genre: Indie pop
- Length: 40:46
- Label: Kitchenware
- Producers: David Brewis; Prefab Sprout

Prefab Sprout chronology
Swoon (1984)	Steve McQueen (1985)

Singles from Swoon
- 1. "Don't Sing" Released: 1984; 2. "Couldn't Bear to be Special" Released: 1984

Swoon is the debut studio album by the English pop band Prefab Sprout, released in March 1984 by Kitchenware Records. Written over a period of seven years, the record was produced with David Brewis on a low budget. The group mostly chose to avoid recording the material they had played live over the years, preferring to make a more intricate record of mostly recent material.

The album is less immediate and accessible than their later albums, with songs incorporating acoustic guitars and keyboards. The songs were written by the band's leader Paddy McAloon, whose unorthodox and literate approach to pop songwriting earned the band a cult following. Upon release, Swoon was widely acclaimed. Several reviewers highlighted its sophisticated musical style and unconventional lyrics, and it reached number 22 on the UK Albums Chart.

== Background and recording ==
Prefab Sprout, formed by brothers Paddy and Martin McAloon, first played live in 1979, having been joined by drummer Michael Salmon. Songs that would appear on Swoon such as "Ghost Town Blues", "Here on the Eerie" and "Technique" were already part of their set by April 1980. The band recorded their first single "Lions in My Own Garden (Exit Someone)" on 25 February 1982, and self-released it on their own Candle Records. Their lineup expanded shortly after to incorporate vocalist Wendy Smith, and they recorded a second single "The Devil Has All the Best Tunes" that September. In a 1981 interview McAloon expressed a dislike of well-regarded songwriters such as Paul Weller, Nick Lowe and Elvis Costello, the last of whom he said he disliked intensely, and he attributed the band's lack of success up to that point to laziness. Prefab Sprout were signed by Keith Armstrong's Kitchenware Records in March 1983, after Armstrong heard their music played in the Newcastle branch of HMV he managed. Kitchenware issued "The Devil Has All The Best Tunes / Walk On" and additionally reissued the first single. These releases attracted notice including laudation from Elvis Costello.

After the departure of Michael Salmon, the band recorded their debut album in a 24-track studio in Edinburgh on a budget of £5,000. It featured session drummer Graham Lant - the older brother of Venom frontman Cronos (Conrad Lant) - and was produced by fellow Kitchenware artist David Brewis of Kane Gang. The songs were written over a 7-year period, and the album was titled Swoon, a name "chosen only for the sound, with no other ulterior motives". McAloon mostly avoided the material the band had been playing live for the preceding years, instead favouring more recent complex material he felt would "only work on tape".

The basic tracks were recorded in just one day, and put the band under intense pressure. During a session, McAloon made a crying Wendy Smith sing two words over and over for three hours. McAloon wrote piano parts for the songs despite being unable to play the instrument, and recorded the parts with the aid of drop-ins. A synthesiser was used on several tracks, chosen for its sparse and refined sound. Swoon was completed in August 1983, and the band was then signed to CBS for distribution Graham Lant's relationship with Prefab Sprout ended soon after recording due to his disappointment at being given a flat fee for his work rather than a percentage of album sales. In the months leading to the album's release in March 1984, the band performed live with a succession of short-term drummers. In December 1983, they opened for Elvis Costello at several concerts. Costello's championing led to Prefab Sprout being tagged as "Costello's little band".

== Composition ==
=== Musical and lyrical style ===
The album's music has been described as idiosyncratic. According to David S. Mordoh of Rockdelux, Swoon is "a collection of breathless verses and crisp rhythms, with lively acoustic guitar strummed funk – a fluid combination – and bossa nova beats draped in symphonic keyboards". Creem Magazine's Karen Schoemer similarly observed how the album's "jumpy playful melodies are fenced in by acoustic guitars and light piano arrangements". while Mark Ellen of Smash Hits described "twisting rhythms and strange wistful chords for scenery". Paul Lester of The Guardian has summarised the album sound as "the lush sweep of George Gershwin and complex musicality of Stephen Sondheim, only played with the awkward angularity of Captain Beefheart's Magic Band". Sondheim, admired by McAloon for his precise emotional and melodic content, was an influence on the album. McAloon considered him one of the "real greats", along with Burt Bacharach and Paul McCartney, and favoured artists who can successfully combine being adventurous with being commercial. Other formative influences include Igor Stravinsky, David Bowie, Karlheinz Stockhausen, Steely Dan and Television. Sam Sodomsky of Pitchfork made note of the album's "post-punk edge" – which would be abandoned in the band's subsequent work – and highlighted McAloon balancing themes of heartbreak and adulthood with "questions that most songwriters might find trivial," while noting Smith's "wordless refrains and non-sequitur exclamations that took pleasure in twisting expectations."

=== Songs ===
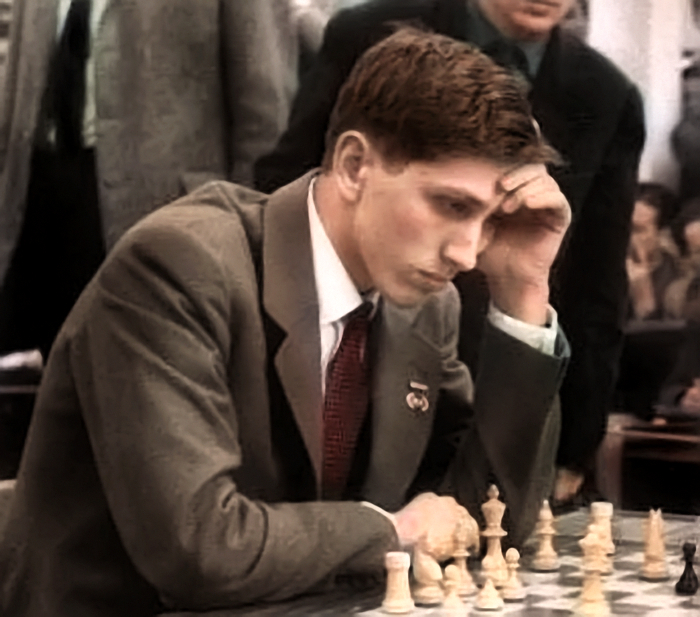
Bobby Fischer, the subject of "Cue Fanfare", in Leipzig, 1960.

The album opens with "Don't Sing", which explicitly follows the narrative of The Power and the Glory by Graham Greene. Thomas Dolby, who produced much of the band's material after Swoon, named the song as an example of the "literary escapism" he was fascinated by in many of their songs, saying "it was like reading a book but trying to simultaneously piece together a musical puzzle". McAloon would later consider the song to have "too many words".

The lyrics of "Cue Fanfare" parallel the drive of the American chess grandmaster Bobby Fischer to the passion which McAloon attaches to phrases from others' song. Fischer won World Chess Championship in 1972, defeating Boris Spassky of the USSR in a game publicised as a Cold War confrontation. The song's first verse begins "Some expressions take me back / Like 'Hair of Gold' and 'Sweet Mary'" – directly quoting "Green, Green Grass of Home", a 1966 UK number 1 for Welsh singer Tom Jones that inspired McAloon as a child. In a 1984 interview, he said the song is about "being inspired to do things for yourself, and the way that people will latch on to heroes because they want somebody else to fight their battles for them vicariously". McAloon wrote the song after scrapping another composition concerning chess, "And Chess Is Beyond Me".

The songs "Green Isaac" and "Green Isaac II" detail the titular character, an innocent attempting to make sense of a world almost too corrupt for him to conceive. McAloon named the songs after the biblical character Isaac and used green because the colour "has an image of innocence or purity". McAloon has said "Here on the Eerie" is a comment on "pop groups who adopt particular attitudes constructed to engage the public when their music isn’t enough" He described himself in a 1985 interview as "cynical about the whole politics-in-pop-music thing", and named the work of Paul Weller and "Shipbuilding" as examples. Reviewing the band in the Sunderland Echo, Paul Woods described "Here on the Eerie" as "brooding funk".

The ballad "Cruel" is sung from the perspective of a self-proclaimed liberal man trying to balance his feminist beliefs with his romantic ache and urge to deliver old-fashioned love platitudes. The singer compares his lament to blues music, playing sarcastically on its reputation of sincerity. Musically, these lyrics are set to a "soft jazz shuffle of brushes and vibes". The band were unhappy with the recording but did not have the time or budget to rerecord the song. "Cruel" nevertheless became a fan favourite, the album's "stunning jewel in the crown" according to Vincent Carroll of Debris Fanzine and was covered by Elvis Costello on his 1984 American tour. Costello praised the song's account of "the perils inherent in expressing a male desire that isn’t oppressive". It was the only song from Swoon to be performed on the band's 1990 tour and to be included on the band's 1992 compilation album A Life of Surprises: The Best of Prefab Sprout.

"Couldn't Bear to Be Special" was singled out by one reviewer as a classic and, with "Cruel", was one of two songs from Swoon performed on the band's 2000 tour. In contemporary interviews, McAloon imagined Michael Jackson covering the song. "I Never Play Basketball Now", the second of the album's two 'sports songs' after "Cue Fanfare", is one of the album's most musically complex tracks with "50 or 60 different shapes in the first three minutes", according to McAloon. Martin McAloon attributed "the chords, the endless chords" to the influence of Stravinsky. The song's lyrics are fatalistic and concern mortality. In contemporary interviews, McAloon spoke of his wish to hear Luther Vandross singing "Elegance", while "Technique" concerns a stargazer who dreams of working Jodrell Bank but feels he probably never will.

== Release ==
"Cruel" and "Don’t Sing" received advance airplay on Kid Jensen's Radio 1 show on 9 January 1984. That month, "Don't Sing" was released as the album's sole single, ultimately peaking at number 62 on January 28. A music video was produced for the song. The band made two appearances on Channel 4's The Tube miming to recordings from the album: in November 1983 they were seen performing "Don't Sing" and on a March 1984 edition of the show they performed "Cruel". Swoon was released in March, entering the UK Albums Charts on the 18th at its peak of number 22 and remaining in the charts for six more weeks. Kitchenware boss Keith Armstrong had had high hopes for Swoon, remarking in an interview that it would "definitely" make the top five on the UK charts. Although Armstrong was incorrect, the album's chart performance was impressive for a band who had never achieved a top 40 single. The album was released with liner notes credited to Emma Welles, later revealed to be a pseudonym for Paddy McAloon:

"When they asked me to write an introduction to their recording, I thought - right, keep it short and sweet, say something that they themselves might say, like: Words Are Trains For Moving Past What Really Has No Name. These are Songs Written Out Of Necessity. That's Swoon. But that seemed a bit rock-ish, and they hate that sort of thing. Anyway it's now late and I'm listening to this for the umpteenth time. My husband went to bed an hour ago - not that he has anything against the Sprouts, but he must get up early tomorrow. I won't be joining him for at least forty minutes. That's Swoon."

== Critical reception ==
Professional ratings
Review scores
Source	Rating
AllMusic	3/5 stars
Number One	3/5
Pitchfork	8.2/10
Q	4/5 stars
Record Mirror	5/5 stars
The Rolling Stone Album Guide	3/5 stars
Select	4/5
Smash Hits	7/10
Spin Alternative Record Guide	7/10
Uncut	7/10

Swoon earned critical acclaim upon release. Melody Maker's Ian Pye commended the "magnificent" album's production despite its humble budget, and felt the songs had a "remarkable continuity" despite being written over a period of years. He commented "it’s hard to imagine any album topping its achievements in 1984". Graham K. Smith of Record Mirror described Swoon as "lightly magnificent, a touch glorious, a little bit heavenly" and "the best record since Imperial Bedroom," while Joe Breen of The Irish Times called it "one of the most arresting and interesting sets released this year" and highlighted the "emotional strength" of "Cruel" and "I Couldn’t Bear To Be Special". Jan-Olov Andersson of Sweden's Aftonbladet declared Swoon "without a doubt one of the best debut albums in recent years; a record full of intelligent, sophisticated pop music with elegant arrangements and artful lyrics". Writing in Debut Magazine, Kathryn Nichols commented "a Prefab song does take quite a few listenings with its unorthodox arrangements and chord changes, but it’s fresh, interesting and certainly worth persevering with" Dave McCullough of Sounds felt the album sounded indie and "would have been better with a big production and a big sound". Writing in Smash Hits, Mark Ellen summarised the album as "marvellous stuff, though just a little pretentious".

Amongst retrospective reviews, Stephen Thomas Erlewine of AllMusic felt that on Swoon, Paddy McAloon had not yet achieved the distinctiveness of Prefab Sprout's subsequent works, writing that "the problem is that he does too many things at once — the lyrics are overstuffed, and the music has too many chord changes and weird juxtapositions, as he tries to put white-funk beats to carefully crafted melodies" and as a result the album is "primarily of interest as a historical item, since it only suggests the promise the band later filled." A review by Q was more positive, calling the album "one of the decade's great debuts" thanks to McAloon's "ingenuity and lyrical flight", while PopMatters retrospectively deemed it "great indie-pop". Trouser Press, meanwhile, highlighted the record's mellifluous, refined sound. Reviewing the album upon its reissue in 1993, Select's Stuart Maconie considered the album the band's weakest, deeming it "full of entertaining ideas but more than a little tricksy and smart Alec", but felt "Cruel" and "Elegance" made the album "well worth owning". Writing for Rockdelux in 1997, David S. Mordoh named "Cue Fanfare", "Cruel", "Elegance" and "Technique" as highlights. "I Never Play Basketball Now" and "Elegance" were among the ten tracks listed in NME's "Alternative Best of Prefab Sprout" in 1992.

== Legacy ==
Reflecting on Swoon in 1990, Paddy McAloon commented; "It's still a favourite, but if I could do it over again, I would make it more concise. Besides that my vocals aren’t great, I didn’t know much about recording." A remastered edition of the album, overseen by Paddy and Martin McAloon, was issued by Sony Music on 27 September 2019.

== Track listing ==
All tracks are written by Paddy McAloon.

No.	Title	Length
1.	"Don't Sing"	3:53
2.	"Cue Fanfare"	4:06
3.	"Green Isaac"	3:31
4.	"Here on the Eerie"	4:00
5.	"Cruel"	4:20
6.	"Couldn't Bear to Be Special"	3:49
7.	"I Never Play Basketball Now"	3:40
8.	"Ghost Town Blues"	3:21
9.	"Elegance"	3:45
10.	"Technique"	4:38
11.	"Green Isaac II"	1:30

== Personnel ==
Credits adapted from the liner notes for Swoon.

Prefab Sprout

- Paddy McAloon – composition, instruments
- Martin McAloon – instruments
- Wendy Smith – instruments

with:

- Graham Lant – drums
- Prefab Sprout – production

Additional personnel

- David Brewis – production
- Pavlou Goldberg – cover
- Matthew Hyphen – cover
- Jon Anderson Turner – engineering
- Emma Welles – liner notes

== Charts ==
Chart (1984)	Peak position
UK Albums (Official Charts)	22
