= Appetite (Prefab Sprout song) =

Single by Prefab Sprout

from the album Steve McQueen
- Released: August 1985
- Recorded: 1984–85
- Genre: Sophisti-pop; new wave
- Length: 3:55
- Label: Kitchenware
- Songwriter: Paddy McAloon
- Producer: Thomas Dolby

Prefab Sprout singles chronology
"Faron Young" (1985)	"Appetite" (1985)	"Johnny Johnny" (1986)

"Appetite" is a song by English pop band Prefab Sprout from their album Steve McQueen. Released as the album's third single by Kitchenware Records in August 1985, it reached number 92 on the UK Singles Chart. Despite its disappointing chart performance, the song has been singled out as one of the highlights of Steve McQueen.

== Composition ==
Paddy McAloon wrote "Appetite" in 1984. It was one of the first songs he had composed on a keyboard and was written using a "hip-hop-type groove" on a drum machine. The song's lyric is about "a pregnant girl so in love with her child that she wants to name it after all the good things in her life". The chorus makes reference to the legendary heroic outlaw Robin Hood, said to have robbed from the rich and given to the poor ("So if you take – then put back good / If you steal – be Robin Hood").

== Recording ==
Producer Thomas Dolby plays the synth intro of "Appetite". He contributed several synth textures to the song, including rolling arpeggiating synth in the choruses and soft pads mirroring Wendy Smith’s backing vocals. Dolby worked closely with Martin McAloon on the song's bass part. He had McAloon sing cut-up lyrics from other songs to remember the bass rhythms he had played in rehearsal. One such song was "The 'In' Crowd" by Dobie Gray.

Paddy McAloon praised Dolby's arrangement work on the song, saying in a 1985 interview "the bass and drums are underneath it locked together in a beautiful pattern and that’s mainly Thomas's work. You've got a counterpoint on all the instruments, whether it's drums or string line. I tend to think of him as a junior Quincy Jones." However, Thomas Dolby felt he didn't do the song justice. McAloon imagined Robert Palmer covering the song.

== Release ==
McAloon considered the song more commercial than the band's previous A-side, "Faron Young". The single performed poorly on the UK Singles Chart, reaching a peak of number 92 over two non-consecutive weeks on the chart. Two B-sides saw release with "Appetite". The 7" features "Heaven Can Wait", an instrumental version of "When The Angels", the closing track on Steve McQueen. The 12" adds "Oh, The Swiss", a piano instrumental which has garnered comparisons to the work of Erik Satie. In a 1988 interview, Paddy McAloon described it as one of his favourite pieces and elaborated on the title "I played it to Muff Winwood and he suddenly turned to me in his revolving chair with a raised eyebrow and said "Oh, the Swiss". It was also a great title". In 2006, Paddy McAloon rerecorded "Appetite" in a solo acoustic arrangement for the expanded 2007 reissue of Steve McQueen.

== Reception and legacy ==
"Appetite" has received critical acclaim, with many considering it a highlight of Steve McQueen. Upon its release, Jerry Smith of Music Week called it "yet another inspired number" from the band. In 1986, Ian Pye of Abbey National Ace Magazine expressed his belief that "Appetite" and "When Love Breaks Down" "will go down as being amongst the classics of their age"

Among retrospective reviews, Classic Pop's Rik Flynn has declared the song Steve McQueen standout and " a perfect example of the Dolby-McAloon marriage" with "a pop melody to die for". Peter Lindblad of Goldmine described "Appetite" as "airy, transluscent [sic]" and one of several songs on Steve McQueen to "merge Paddy’s classic pop leanings with the stylish swoops and dives of the Smiths". Andrew Mueller of Uncut has described the song as "supremely pretty".

== Track listings ==
=== 7" vinyl single ===
Side 1

1. "Appetite"

Side 2

1. "Heaven Can Wait (instrumental version of "When the Angels")

=== 12" vinyl single ===
Side 1

1. "Appetite"

Side 2

1. "Heaven Can Wait (instrumental version of "When the Angels")
2. "Oh, the Swiss!"

== Charts ==
Chart (1985)	Peak position
Australia (Kent Music Report)	45
United Kingdom (Official Charts Company)	92
