= A Life of Surprises =

A Life of Surprises may refer to:

- "Life of Surprises", a 1993 single by Prefab Sprout, originally included on their 1989 album, Protest Songs
- A Life of Surprises: The Best of Prefab Sprout, a 1992 compilation album by Prefab Sprout
- A Life of Surprises, a Big Finish Productions original anthology edited by Paul Cornell
