= Radio Love =

Radio Love may refer to:

- "Radio Love", a song by Sarah Buxton from her 2010 self-titled album
- "Radio Love", a song by Nadia Mukami released in 2019
- "Radio Love", a song by Prefab Sprout released as the B-side to their 1982 debut single "Lions in My Own Garden (Exit Someone)"
