= Right Back Here in My Arms =

Right Back Here in My Arms may refer to:

- A song by Prince from Emancipation (1996)
- A song by Sirens from Control Freaks (2004)
