= When Love Breaks Down =

- Artwork for 1985 UK reissue (7-inch vinyl edition pictured)

Single by Prefab Sprout

from the album Steve McQueen
- B-side: "Diana" (first release); "The Yearning Loins" (reissue)
- Released: 1984 (first release); 1985 (reissue); 2007 (acoustic version)
- Recorded: 1984, RAK Studios, London
- Genre: Sophisti-pop; new wave
- Length: 3:40 (single edit); 4:08 (UK Steve McQueen album version); 3:44 (US Two Wheels Good version)
- Label: Kitchenware
- Songwriter: Paddy McAloon
- Producer: Phil Thornalley

Prefab Sprout singles chronology
"Don't Sing" (1984)	"When Love Breaks Down" (1984)	"Faron Young" (1985)
"Appetite" (1985)	"When Love Breaks Down (reissue)" (1985)	"Johnny Johnny" (1986)

"When Love Breaks Down" is a single by English pop band Prefab Sprout, first released by Kitchenware Records in October 1984. It was the first single taken from their album of the following year, Steve McQueen. In its first release, the single did not chart on the UK Singles Chart, but a reissue the following year in 1985 reached No. 25. The song was also the group's first chart appearance in the United States, peaking at No. 42 on the Billboard Top Rock Tracks chart in October 1985.

"When Love Breaks Down" was recorded and mixed at RAK Studios, London. The song was re-released in March 2007, this time with an entirely new acoustic arrangement, recorded in 2006 by frontman Paddy McAloon to coincide with the two-disc Legacy Edition of Steve McQueen.

The B-side to the original single release was "Diana", which would later be re-recorded and included on the album Protest Songs (which was originally going to be released after Steve McQueen but was shelved until 1989).

== Charts ==
Chart (1985)	Peak position
Australia (Kent Music Report)	55
New Zealand (Recorded Music NZ)	38
UK Singles (OCC)	25
US Mainstream Rock (Billboard)	42

== Cover versions ==
The song has been covered by many artists including the Zombies, E'voke, Kate Walsh, Lisa Stansfield, Portastatic, Snow Patrol and Nerina Pallot.
