= Lions in My Own Garden (Exit Someone) =

- Kitchenware's 1983 reissue artwork

Single by Prefab Sprout
- B-side: "Radio Love"
- Released: 1982
- Recorded: 25 February 1982
- Genre: Indie pop
- Length: 2:36
- Label: Candle Records, Kitchenware
- Songwriter: Paddy McAloon
- Producer: Terry Gavaghan

Prefab Sprout singles chronology
"Lions in My Own Garden (Exit Someone)" (1982)	"The Devil Has All the Best Tunes" (1983)

"Lions in My Own Garden (Exit Someone)", rendered "Lions in My Own Garden: Exit Someone" on its initial release, is the first single by English pop band Prefab Sprout. It was first released on the band's own Candle Records in 1982, and reissued in 1983 after the band were signed by Kitchenware Records.

== Composition ==
The song was recorded on 25 February 1982 by a three-piece line-up of Prefab Sprout comprising vocalist and guitarist Paddy McAloon, bassist Martin McAloon and drummer Michael Salmon. McAloon has described this early lineup as sounding like a mix of the Clash and Steely Dan. Wendy Smith joined the band later in 1982. The song utilises simple instrumentation – acoustic guitar, bass, drums, harmonica and vibraphone – but the structure is complex, ignoring the conventional verse-chorus pattern. According to Adrian Thrills of NME, "the meandering melody line takes more than a cursory listen before it connects". Despite the song garnering comparisons to Scottish jangle pop bands Orange Juice and Aztec Camera, McAloon was influenced by the Beatles. McAloon would comment "For me, it’s very close to "Love Me Do", very pure, spontaneous."

The lyric concern McAloon's feelings about being apart from his one-time girlfriend, who had left England to study Law in the University of Limoges. McAloon wrote the song to show how much he missed her, and took the letters of Limoges to create the song title, with the name of the city acting as an acronym. McAloon explained in a 1988 interview "this idea of having lions watching you in your own garden matches the feeling of insecurity coming from the abnormality of the situation. Something scary, expressed in a language of my own". Music journalist Stuart Maconie has described the track as "enigmatic, melancholy, tuneful and therefore perfect for a jobless literature graduate with girlfriend problems".

== Release ==
After having no success with major labels, Prefab Sprout set up Candle Records (slogan: The Wax That Won't Get on Your Wick) to release their first single, limited to 1000 copies. £800 Martin McAloon had earned from a two-month stint as a nightwatchman was used to fund the release. This 1982 release rendered the A-side's title as "Lions in My Own Garden: Exit Someone". The song was backed with "Radio Love", a song McAloon described as "a celebration of pop music".

The song received airplay by John Peel on BBC Radio 1. Speaking on Gary Crowley's weekly Capital Radio show The Magic Box, Elvis Costello named the single one of the best he had heard all year. Prefab Sprout later supported Costello at several concerts in December 1983.

The band were signed to Keith Armstrong's Kitchenware Records in March 1983, after Armstrong heard "Lions in My Own Garden: Exit Someone" played in the Newcastle branch of HMV he managed. Kitchenware reissued the single as "Lions in My Own Garden (Exit Someone)" in 1983. The song made its CD debut in 1990 when it was included on the Rough Trade compilation (Thanks To Rough Trade For) A Constant Source Of Interruption. It appears as track 1 on Prefab Sprout's second "best of" album, 38 Carat Collection (1999) and on Cherry Red Records' 2013 compilation album Scared to Get Happy: A Story of Indie-Pop 1980–1989.

== Track listings ==
=== 7" ===
Side 1

1. "Lions in My Own Garden (Exit Someone)"

Side 2

1. "Radio Love"
