= Neil Conti =

English drummer (born 1959)

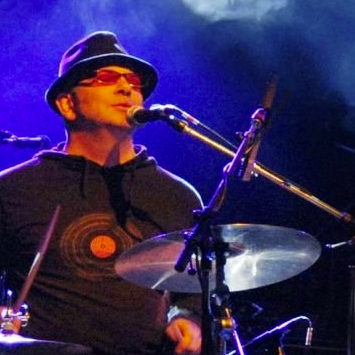

Background information
- Born: 12 February 1959 (age 67)
- Origin: London, England
- Occupations: Musician; producer
- Instruments: Drums; percussion
- Years active: 1983–present
- Formerly of: Prefab Sprout
- Website: http://www.minimoonstudio.com/

Neil Conti (born 12 February 1959) is an English drummer and music producer best known as a member of the English pop band Prefab Sprout (1983–1993, 2000). As an in-demand session drummer, he has collaborated with acts such as David Bowie, Mick Jagger, Annie Lennox, Cher, Level 42, Laurie Anderson, Steve Winwood, Paul Young, Youssou N'dour, Brian Eno, Robert Palmer, Deep Forest, and Will Young.

== Early life ==
Born to musically-orientated parents, the six-year-old Conti was trained as a classical pianist at their encouragement. He became interested in performing after seeing his cousin Morgan Fisher onstage as keyboardist for Mott the Hoople, feeling it looked like "much more fun than doing four hours of piano scales every day". Twelve years old at the time and inspired by the band's drummer, Dale Griffin, he started playing drums and, over the next few years, gained some drumming experience with numerous local rock bands while showing an interest in jazz and soul music.

== Career ==
After completing a diploma in graphic design, Conti moved to London, where his musical apprenticeship included a range of styles such as reggae, calypso and funk. Among the early bands in which he drummed were Linx, Tropicana Steel Band, Kokomo and Combo Passe as well as various recording sessions with such artists such as Pauline Black and Carl Douglas. In a 1988 interview, he listed Stix Hooper of the Crusaders and Ronnie "Diamond" Hoard of Ohio Players as among his drumming influences.

In late 1983, Conti joined Prefab Sprout as drummer after hearing Paddy McAloon being interviewed on Richard Skinner's show on BBC Radio 1 and calling the office of Kitchenware Records to offer his services. He remained a member of the band for the next decade and featured on their successful studio albums Steve McQueen, From Langley Park to Memphis, Protest Songs and Jordan: The Comeback. With Prefab Sprout, he toured the UK and Europe and was acting as the band's live MD by 1990. Conti considered Protest Songs a personal highlight, declaring "I would also probably put it up there near the top if someone asked which drumming performances I have been happiest with. It's one of the few albums I have done where I can bear to listen without flinching from 'hearing that bit that I could've done better'". Conti did not appear on Andromeda Heights (1997), Prefab Sprout's sixth album that followed several years of inactivity, but he rejoined the band for their 2000 tour.

During his tenure with Prefab Sprout, Conti also became a session musician, playing on records by many well-known artists. He backed David Bowie in the 1985 sessions that produced "Absolute Beginners" and "That’s Motivation" for the Absolute Beginners soundtrack. He featured on two further Bowie recordings – "Dancing in the Street" with Mick Jagger and "Chilly Down" – and played in Bowie's band for his Live Aid set in July 1985. In late 1987, Conti performed with Level 42 on their USA tour after Phil Gould departed the band. In 1993, he released Funky Drums From Hell, an album of soul grooves intended for sampling.

In 1989, Conti and Raye Cosbert (who later become promoter of Massive Attack and manager of Amy Winehouse) started "Backstage", a live bi-weekly music club for artists to meet and jam together. Neil's motivation was the closing of the famous Speakeasy Club - a popular watering hole for London musicians to meet up. The club was based at the Borderline in Charing Cross Road, later moving to the Jazz Café in Camden. The club spawned many imitations in the Soho area and became a hotbed of talent and A&R men, launching the careers of Ronnie Jordan, Seal, Keziah Jones, Juliet Roberts and D-Influence among others. The club was featured in an MTV documentary and recorded a live CD, sponsored by Levi's. Conti terminated the club in 1992 due to time constraints and conflicts with his session work.

Following a move to France in 2001, Conti opened a recording studio in Montpellier, where he produces artists. Still an active drummer, he frequently travels to London to work or, alternatively, provides drum tracks by internet from his studio in France. The studio, Minimoon, is staffed by him and recording engineer Jeff Fernandez.

== Selected credits ==
- You're My Number One - Nils Landgren (1985)
- Steve McQueen - Prefab Sprout (1985)
- Protest Songs - Prefab Sprout (1985)
- From Langley Park To Memphis - Prefab Sprout (1987)
- Jordan: The Comeback - Prefab Sprout (1990)
- "Dancing in the Street" - David Bowie and Mick Jagger (1985)
- Absolute Beginners: The Original Motion Picture Soundtrack - David Bowie (1986)
- Boat to Bolivia - Martin Stephenson and the Daintees (1986)
- Hello Angel - Sandie Shaw (1988)
- Surprise - Syd Straw (1989)
- Trading Secrets with the Moon - The Adventures (1989)
- The Same Sky - Horse (1990)
- Uncertain Pleasures - Mary Coughlan (1990)
- Other Voices - Paul Young (1990)
- Dreamworld - Steve Booker (1990)
- Hoodoo - Alison Moyet (1991)
- Le Manteau de pluie - Jean-Louis Murat (1991)
- Ser de Agua - Presuntos Implicados (1991)
- Whaler - Sophie B. Hawkins (1994)
- Medusa - Annie Lennox (1995)
- Feeler - Marcella Detroit (1996)
- Elena - Maggie Reilly (1996)
- Am I the Kinda Girl? - Cathy Dennis (1996)
- Comparsa - Deep Forest III (1998)
- Live the Life - Michael W. Smith (1998)
- Friday's Child - Will Young (2003)
- Keep On - Will Young (2005)
- Future Past - Duncan James (2006)
- Moon Landing - James Blunt (2013)
- 8 - Luis Fonsi (2015)
