= The Motorettes =

English emo/pop punk band

- Origin: Tynemouth, England
- Genres: Emo, Pop punk
- Years active: 2005–2009
- Label: Kitchenware Records
- Members: Robin Howe (guitars, vocals); Jack Laidlaw (vocals, bass); Jed Laidlaw (drums, percussion)
- Website: http://www.themotorettes.com/

The Motorettes were a band from the North East England coastal town of Tynemouth. The band was described by the Manchester Evening News as emo and pop punk. They were signed to Kitchenware Records. Their album "Super Heartbeats" reached #83 on the UK Singles chart.

== Discography ==
Albums

- The Motorettes, Kitchenware Records, 2006
1. "Super Heartbeats" – 3:07
2. "You Gotta Look the Parts" – 2:55
3. "Go! Go! Gadget Girl" – 2:16
4. "Heart... Stop... Ing" – 4:08
5. "I'm on Fire" – 3:14
6. "Baby Come Home" – 3:40
7. "I Hate to See You Cry" – 4:50
8. "The Death of Cool" – 2:45
9. "(Do You Wanna Be My) Girlfriend?" – 2:38
10. "I Am Blisters, I Am" – 3:25
11. "Relax, It's the 80's" – 2:41
12. "Vs the Mountain" – 2:30

Singles

- "Super Heartbeats", Kitchenware Records, 2005
- Split with Kubichek!, Kitchenware Records, 2006
- "I Am Blisters, I Am", Kitchenware Records, 2006
- "You Gotta Look The Parts", Kitchenware Records, 2006
