= The Devil Has All the Best Tunes =

Single by Prefab Sprout
- B-side: "Walk On"
- Released: September 1983
- Recorded: 1983
- Length: 4:39
- Label: Kitchenware
- Songwriter: Paddy McAloon
- Producer: Hal Remington

Prefab Sprout singles chronology
"Lions in My Own Garden (Exit Someone)" (1982)	"The Devil Has All the Best Tunes" (1983)	"Don't Sing" (1984)

"The Devil Has All the Best Tunes" is the second single by English pop band Prefab Sprout. It was their first release to feature Wendy Smith and their first release after signing with Kitchenware Records. As of 2025, the single has only appeared once on CD - on The Indie Scene 83.

== Composition ==
Prefab Sprout were signed to Kitchenware Records after label boss Keith Armstrong heard their first single, the self-released "Lions in My Own Garden (Exit Someone)" (1982), playing in the Newcastle branch of HMV he managed. "The Devil Has All the Best Tunes" was the band's first single on Kitchenware, and their first since Wendy Smith joined the band. Smith's backing vocals feature heavily on the song.

'The Devil has all the best tunes' is an expression referring to secular music. The first known use of the phrase in print is in the December 1773 edition of the Monthly Review: "They (the Moravians and Methodists) have adopted the music of some of our finest songs... ...and they have given good reasons for so doing: for, as Whitefield said, 'Why should the devil have all the best tunes?'". Though this text credits the expression to the English Anglican cleric George Whitefield, it is now commonly attributed to the English evangelist and hymn writer Rowland Hill (1744–1833). Hill used the expression in reference to Charles Wesley's habit of setting his hymns to popular secular tunes. The phrase was later popularised by William Booth to promote the Salvation Army. Paddy McAloon liked the phrase, and used it as a starting point for the song.

According to music journalist Chris Heath, "The Devil Has All the Best Tunes" is "an intricate web of melodies and voices". Paddy McAloon stated in a 1984 interview "I really wanted to do was a kind of musical boast... ..."The Devil has all the best tunes? No he hasn’t!", that's why it swirls with all kinds of different melodies, clarinets". In addition to guitar, bass, drums and clarinet, the song utilises piano and glockenspiel. The song was released as the band's second single because it was the only song they had on tape, and they were "completely broke". According to McAloon, most around the band considered the song too long and not catchy enough for single release.

McAloon wrote the B-side "Walk On" when he was 18. McAloon describes the song as about "the consolation of pop music when you’re young, doing exams, listening to pop music, and ending up in your own little world".

== Release ==
"The Devil Has All the Best Tunes" received critical acclaim, with "Strikkers" of Record Mirror describing it as "quite simply a classic". According to Paddy McAloon, the single was Kitchenware's biggest selling to date as of January 1984.

=== Track listing ===
- 7"
1. ""The Devil Has All the Best Tunes" – 4:39
2. "Walk On" – 2:45
