= Sirens (British group) =

British girl group

- Origin: Newcastle upon Tyne, England
- Genres: R&B, pop, hip hop, dance-pop
- Instrument: Vocals
- Years active: 2001–2011
- Labels: Kitchenware Records
- Past members: Karina Chambers; Lea Reynolds; Kat Monaco; Lynsey Schofield; Michelle Heaton
- Website: Official web site

Sirens were a British girl group from Newcastle upon Tyne, best known for their UK top 50 single, "Baby (Off the Wall)".

== History ==
The Sirens line-up originally consisted of Karina Brians, Kat Haslam, Lynsey Schofield and Michelle Heaton. Heaton left to join Liberty X and was replaced by Lea Cummings. They dubbed themselves Sirens in honour of the infamous Greek myth of three beautiful women (Siren) luring sailors to their deaths by singing to them.

Brians left school at 14 to try to make money by doing a variety of jobs before running her own stableyard. Haslam set up her own business as soon as she was old enough. However, when they met aged 17, both knew that their future was in writing and making music together.

=== Control Freaks ===
To get their big break, Brians and Haslam sold their automobiles to finance their studio demos in London, and also slept rough. After a variety of early trial and error line-ups Sirens were formed when Schofield and Cummings joined. Soon after, the girls signed a recording contract with the independent record label, Kitchenware Records, also home to Editors.

Their debut single was a cover of N*E*R*D's "Things Are Gettin' Better". Their second single "Baby (Off the Wall)" became their highest charting single, peaking at number forty-nine on the UK Singles Chart. Their debut album Control Freaks, released two weeks after "Baby (Off the Wall)", became a club hit in the UK and achieved commercial success in the Far East, which allowed the band to create their second album.

Between albums Sirens released a non-album single, "Love Hurts", featuring a sample from ODB. This was the final single with Schofield who left after its release.

=== Say Goodbye to LA LA Land ===
Their second album, Say Goodbye to LA LA Land saw the band writing and recording in Los Angeles, California with record producers Wayne Rodrigues, Justin Trugman, D. C. Joseph and DeeKay. Rap contributions come from Najee and D-Roc from New York. The album was mixed by Dave Pensado, noted for his hits with Christina Aguilera and The Black Eyed Peas and was released on 16 June 2008.

=== #3 – Opium Apathy ===
Sirens released "Don't Let Go" in November 2009, the first single from their third album. A second electropop single called "Stilettos" was released on 4 October 2010. The third album from the band, #3 – Opium Apathy, was released on 27 March 2011 and in the same period, they issued the third single from the album, "Good Enough".

== Discography ==
=== Albums ===
Title	Album details
Control Freaks	Released: 30 August 2004; Label: Kitchenware
Say Goodbye to LA LA Land	Released: 16 June 2008; Label: Kitchenware
#3 – Opium Apathy	Released: 27 March 2011; Label: Kitchenware

=== Singles ===
Year	Title	Chart positions	Album
Year	Title	UK	Album
2003	"Things Are Gettin' Better"	127	Control Freaks
2004	"Baby (Off the Wall)"	49	Control Freaks
2005	"Love Hurts" (featuring ODB)	140	Non-album single
2008	"Club LA LA"	—	Say Goodbye to LA LA Land
2009	"Don't Let Go"	—	#3 – Opium Apathy
2010	"Stilettos"	—	#3 – Opium Apathy
2011	"Good Enough"	—	#3 – Opium Apathy
