= Control Freaks (album) =

Studio album by Sirens
- Released: 30 August 2004
- Recorded: 2003
- Genre: R&B, pop, hip hop
- Label: Kitchenware Records

Sirens chronology
Control Freaks (2004)	Say Goodbye To La La Land (2008)

Singles from Control Freaks
- 1. "Things Are Gettin' Better" Released: 4 August 2003; 2. "Baby (Off the Wall)" Released: 14 August 2004

Control Freaks is the debut album by the British R&B/pop girl group Sirens. The album featured the singles "Things Are Gettin' Better" and "Baby (Off The Wall)", their highest-charting song to date.

== Track listing ==
No.	Title	Length
1.	"Baby (Off the Wall)"	4:01
2.	"Control"	4:22
3.	"Finger on the Trigger"	3:28
4.	"Come Correct"	3:45
5.	"Things Are Gettin' Better"	3:53
6.	"Little Man"	3:54
7.	"Right Back Here in My Arms"	3:31
8.	"Mad About You"	4:08
9.	"The Sins"	3:24
10.	"How I Be"	3:34

Japanese Bonus Tracks
No.	Title	Length
11.	"Baby" (Muzik Kidz Remix)
12.	"Things Are Gettin' Better" (Maximus Remix)
