= The Changes (band) =

The Changes is a Chicago rock band formed in March 2002.

Their music has been described as filtering in the new wave end of rock, with its dreamy jangle and jazzy rhythms. The band's members are Darren Spitzer (vocals/guitar/keys), Rob Kallick (bass guitar/keys), David Rothblatt (lead guitar/keys/vocals) and Jonny Basofin (drums and bells/keys). Their debut album Today Is Tonight was released on September 26, 2006, on Drama Club Records in the United States and Kitchenware Records in Europe. They released a 7" double A-side single of "Her You and I" and "Such A Scene" in the UK on Kitchenware Records on May 28, 2007. After performing as the only unsigned band at Lollapalooza tour in 2005, The Changes officially signed with an independent record label soon after.

The Changes have also played with The Futureheads, Ted Leo and the Pharmacists, Stephen Malkmus, Metric, The Walkmen, Office, Elefant, Kaiser Chiefs, The 1900s, The Thrills, The Cinematics, The Spinto Band and Tally Hall.

== Discography ==
=== Singles & EPs ===
- First of May, 2003
- The Changes, 2005
- Florida, 2007
- Her You and I / Such a Scene, 7", Kitchenware Records, 2007
- When I Wake / No One Needs To Know, 7", Kitchenware Records, 2007
- Mirror Dreams, 2024

=== Albums ===
Today Is Tonight

Studio album by The Changes
- Released: September 26, 2006
- Genre: New wave, indie rock
- Length: 44:12
- Label: Drama Club Records

The Changes chronology
First of May EP (2005)	Today Is Tonight (2006)	Florida (2007)

Professional ratings
Review scores
Source	Rating
allgigs.co.uk	link
Allmusic	link

- Today Is Tonight, Drama Club Records, 2006. Today Is Tonight is the debut album from American rock band The Changes.

Track listing

1. "When I Wake" – 3:15
2. "On a String" – 3:41
3. "Water of the Gods" – 2:22
4. "Sisters" – 4:06
5. "House of Style" – 3:24
6. "Modern Love" – 3:31
7. "Twilight" – 4:15
8. "The Machine" – 3:37
9. "Such a Scene" – 2:45
10. "In the Dark" – 3:38
11. "Her, You and I" – 6:15
12. "When I Sleep" – 3:25
- American Master, 2013
1. "A Mystery"
2. "Bones"
3. "No One Wants to Be Alone"
4. "Mask"
5. "Logan Square"
6. "I Woke Up"
7. "Gas Station Girl"
8. "It Was Saturday"
9. "In My Mind"
10. "Stays In Your Heart"
11. "Never Blue"
