= Steve McQueen (album) =

Studio album by Prefab Sprout
- Released: June 22, 1985
- Recorded: 1984–1985
- Studios: Nomis (London); Marcus (London)
- Genres: Sophisti-pop; indie pop; jazz pop
- Length: 45:18
- Labels: Kitchenware; Epic
- Producer: Thomas Dolby (except for track 4, which was produced by Phil Thornalley)

Prefab Sprout chronology
Swoon (1984)	Steve McQueen (1985)	From Langley Park to Memphis (1988)

Singles from Steve McQueen
- 1. "When Love Breaks Down" Released: October 1984 (first issue); 2. "When Love Breaks Down" Released: March 1985 (reissue); 3. "Faron Young" Released: July 1985; 4. "Appetite" Released: August 1985; 5. "When Love Breaks Down" Released: October 1985 (second reissue); 6. "Johnny Johnny" Released: January 1986

Steve McQueen is the second studio album by English alternative pop band Prefab Sprout, released on 22 June 1985 in the UK by Kitchenware Records. On 3 September 1985, the album was released by Epic Records in the United States as Two Wheels Good in anticipation of legal conflict with the estate of American actor Steve McQueen. The album cover references McQueen's lifelong passion for Triumph motorcycles and his 1963 film The Great Escape.

The album received highly positive reviews from critics and was a modest commercial success, reaching number 21 in the United Kingdom. Four singles from the album entered top 100 of the UK Singles Chart, with "When Love Breaks Down" reaching the top 30. Retrospectively, Steve McQueen has received lasting critical acclaim, widely credited as an indie pop benchmark and ranked by many British publications among the greatest albums of all time.

In 2007, it was reissued as a "legacy edition" double CD, featuring a remastered version of the original album and a bonus disc featuring acoustic versions of the songs recorded in 2006 by the band's frontman, Paddy McAloon.

== Recording ==
On an episode of the BBC Radio 1 programme Roundtable, musician and producer Thomas Dolby, a panelist on the programme, spoke favourably of Prefab Sprout's "Don't Sing", a track from their 1984 album Swoon. The band subsequently contacted Dolby, who met with frontman and songwriter Paddy McAloon in the latter's County Durham home. McAloon presented Dolby with a number of songs he had written, "probably 40 or 50" by Dolby's estimate, some written as far back as 10 to 12 years prior. Dolby then picked his favourites and asked McAloon to make demo recordings of them; these recordings served as the basis for Dolby's initial process of planning the album's recording.

In the autumn of 1984, Dolby and Prefab Sprout began working on the album's songs in rehearsals at Nomis Studios in West London, after which they moved to Marcus Studios for proper recording. The sessions were amicable, with the band being respectful of Dolby's edge over them in recording and musical experience, and Dolby keeping into account the band's wishes, knowing that McAloon "wouldn't want to be diluted" by Dolby's additions to the album. Subsequent mixing was carried out at Farmyard Studios in Buckinghamshire.

== Music and lyrics ==
Musically, Steve McQueen is informed by Dolby's lush, jazz-tinged production. Pitchfork said the album "was McAloon's stab at pop, a suite of literate songs that draw as much from 1950s rock and country as from Elvis Costello." Wendy Smith's backing vocals have been described as "serv[ing] as guide rails" on the album. McAloon's lyrics on Steve McQueen touch on a number of themes, including love, infidelity, regret, and heartbreak. Alex Robertson of Sputnikmusic described the album's songs as lyrically "literate and humorous without being condescending in the slightest".

== Singles ==
"When Love Breaks Down" was first released as a single in October 1984, before the album was released, but failed to chart in the top 40, peaking at No. 89 on the UK Singles Chart. It was reissued as a new single in March 1985, but again failed to chart, peaking at No. 88. It was only after the album's release, and on the single's third issue in October 1985, that it finally broke through the top 40 and peaked at No. 25 for two weeks in November and December 1985.

Between the second and third releases of "When Love Breaks Down", two further singles were released: "Faron Young" (referencing the country music singer of the same name) in July 1985, peaking at No. 74, and "Appetite" in August 1985, peaking at No. 92.

"Goodbye Lucille #1" was renamed "Johnny Johnny" for the final single release from the album in January 1986, peaking at No. 64.

== Critical reception ==
Steve McQueen was critically acclaimed at the time of its release. Record Mirror's Graham K. Smith awarded it a score of five out of five, championing it as "the finest album you will hear this year" and Paddy McAloon as "the country's best (by a mile) songwriter". Rating the album nine out of ten in Smash Hits, Chris Heath praised McAloon as one of the best writers of "depressingly precise songs about the joys, fears and disappointments of love" and lamented that listeners might be put off by the "obscurity and complexity" of Prefab Sprout's music.

Spin critic Richard Gehr cited Cole Porter, George Gershwin, Lennon–McCartney, and Elvis Costello, among other figures, as some of the various "ghosts lurking" in McAloon's lyrics, and wrote: "I confess that the usual sensitive singer-songwriter crap almost always makes me squeal with boredom, but McAloon delivers the bacon here." Robert Christgau of The Village Voice, giving the album a "B+" grade, called McAloon "a type we've met many times before—the well-meaning cad", and was reminded of "the justly obscure, unjustly forgotten Jo Mama—or of Aztec Camera if Roddy Frame were a cad." In a less enthusiastic review for NME, Danny Kelly found Steve McQueen "both brilliant and flawed", complimenting McAloon's songwriting but criticising the album's "clipped, parchment-dry jazz" sound.

At the end of 1985, Steve McQueen was named the fourth best album of the year by NME, and placed 28th in The Village Voice's Pazz & Jop critics' poll.

== Legacy ==
Retrospective professional ratings
Review scores
Source	Rating
AllMusic	5/5 stars
Classic Pop	5/5 stars
The Irish Times	4/5 stars
Mojo	5/5 stars
Pitchfork	8.6/10
Q	4/5 stars
Record Collector	4/5 stars
The Rolling Stone Album Guide	3.5/5 stars
Spin	4.5/5 stars
Uncut	5/5 stars

Subsequent retrospective reviews of Steve McQueen have also been highly favourable. AllMusic's Jason Ankeny appraised it as "a minor classic, a shimmering jazz-pop masterpiece sparked by Paddy McAloon's witty and inventive songwriting." Reviewing the 2007 legacy edition for Record Collector, Terry Staunton wrote that "more than 20 years on, his dissertations on love, loss and uncertainty are just as affecting, the intelligence of the lyrics matched by the sophistication of the chord structures and the musical arrangements."

The Sunday Times labelled the legacy edition as revealing McAloon's "genius" and described the record as being "buttressed by a phenomenal rhythm section and fairy-dusted with Wendy Smith's breathy harmonies". In Spin, Will Hermes deemed Steve McQueen Dolby's "supreme achievement" as a producer. Pitchfork reviewer Stephen Troussé highlighted Dolby's "profoundly 80s sonic palette", which Troussé said reflected "one of the defining qualities of the record... its pop ambition, its willingness to engage with its times, precisely by not being a sullen singer-songwriter would-be timeless classic."

Noel Murray of The A.V. Club wrote that Steve McQueen and its predecessor Swoon "are considered classics of the mid-'80s post-punk/new-wave era, even though they don't sound like they belong to any particular movement." Russ Slater of PopMatters described them as "two albums of great indie-pop" that established Prefab Sprout in the 1980s as "one of Britain's brightest lights". Steve McQueen was featured in Treble's 2014 list of 10 essential sophisti-pop albums; in his review for Pitchfork, Troussé cited it as "the defining record of 1985 sophisto-pop".

Steve McQueen has been included in several professional lists of the greatest albums of all time. The album placed at No. 47 in a 1993 poll by The Times, No. 90 in a 1995 poll by Mojo, and No. 61 in a 1997 poll by The Guardian. It was also selected for inclusion in the book 1001 Albums You Must Hear Before You Die.

== Track listing ==
All tracks are written by Paddy McAloon, except where noted.

No.	Title	Length
1.	"Faron Young" (retitled "Faron" on US edition)	3:50
2.	"Bonny"	3:45
3.	"Appetite"	3:56
4.	"When Love Breaks Down" (UK and US editions feature different mixes of the song)	4:08
5.	"Goodbye Lucille #1" (retitled "Johnny Johnny" for single release)	4:31
6.	"Hallelujah"	4:20
7.	"Moving the River"	3:57
8.	"Horsin' Around"	4:39
9.	"Desire As"	5:19
10.	"Blueberry Pies"	2:24
11.	"When the Angels"	4:29

US CD bonus tracks
No.	Title	Writer(s)	Length
12.	"The Yearning Loins"		3:38
13.	"He'll Have to Go"	Joe Allison; Audrey Allison	3:06
14.	"Faron" (Truckin' mix)		4:45

Legacy edition bonus disc
No.	Title	Length
1.	"Appetite" (acoustic version)	3:57
2.	"Bonny" (acoustic version)	5:58
3.	"Desire As" (acoustic version)	7:08
4.	"When Love Breaks Down" (acoustic version)	4:24
5.	"Goodbye Lucille #1" (acoustic version)	3:54
6.	"Moving the River" (acoustic version)	3:39
7.	"Faron Young" (acoustic version)	3:47
8.	"When the Angels" (acoustic version)	4:08

== Personnel ==
Credits are adapted from the album's liner notes.

Prefab Sprout

- Neil Conti – drums, percussion
- Martin McAloon – bass
- Paddy McAloon – guitar, keyboards, vocals
- Wendy Smith – keyboards, backing vocals

Additional personnel

- Kevin Armstrong – guitar (tracks 6, 9)
- Matt Barry – engineering (assistant)
- Dana – engineering (assistant)
- Thomas Dolby – instruments, mixing, production
- East Orange – sleeve design
- Brian Evans – engineering
- Tim Hunt – engineering
- Mark Lockheart – saxophone (track 9)
- Andy Scarth – engineering
- Chris Sheldon – engineering
- Mike Shipley – mixing, mixdown engineering
- Kathy Smith – engineering (assistant)
- Sven Taits – engineering (assistant)
- Phil Thornalley – production, engineering, vocal tape loops, mixing (track 4); production (US bonus tracks 12, 13, 14)
- Peter Simpson – photography, hand-colouring

== Charts ==
Chart (1985)	Peak position
Australian Albums (Kent Music Report)	48
Canada Top Albums/CDs (RPM)	47
Dutch Albums (Album Top 100)	34
New Zealand Albums (RMNZ)	33
UK Albums (Official Charts)	21
US Billboard 200	178
