= Stuart Maconie =

English radio DJ and television presenter

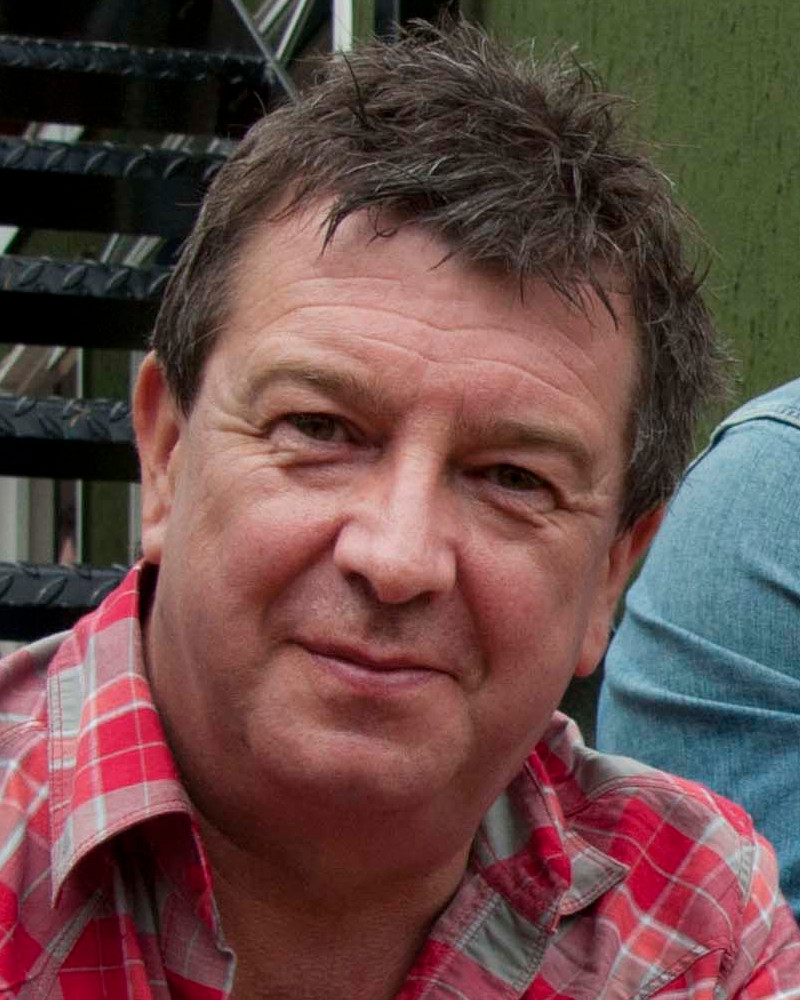
- Maconie in 2010
- Born: Stuart John Maconie; 13 August 1961 (age 65); Whiston, Lancashire, England
- Education: Edge Hill University
- Occupations: Author; journalist; broadcaster; radio presenter; television presenter
- Employers: Courtaulds; Skelmersdale College; NME; BBC
- Spouse: Eleanor Maconie
- Website: stuartmaconie.com

Stuart John Maconie (born 13 August 1961) is an English radio DJ and television presenter, writer, journalist, and critic working in the field of pop music and popular culture. He is a presenter on BBC Radio 6 Music where, alongside Mark Radcliffe, he hosts its weekend breakfast show (Saturday–Sunday, 8 am – 10 am) which broadcasts from the BBC's MediaCityUK in Salford. The pair previously presented an evening show on BBC Radio 2 and the weekday afternoon show for BBC Radio 6 Music.

Maconie used to present his own solo show on Radio 2 on Saturday afternoons from April 2006 until 29 March 2008. He also hosts BBC Radio 6 Music programmes The Freak Zone, on Sundays from 8 pm to 10 pm and Freak Zone Playlist (formerly known as The Freakier Zone) on Wednesdays/Thursdays from midnight to 1 am.

== Early life ==
Maconie was born in Whiston, Lancashire. He was raised in Wigan, Lancashire. He was educated at St John Rigby College, Orrell and Edge Hill College (now Edge Hill University), in Ormskirk.

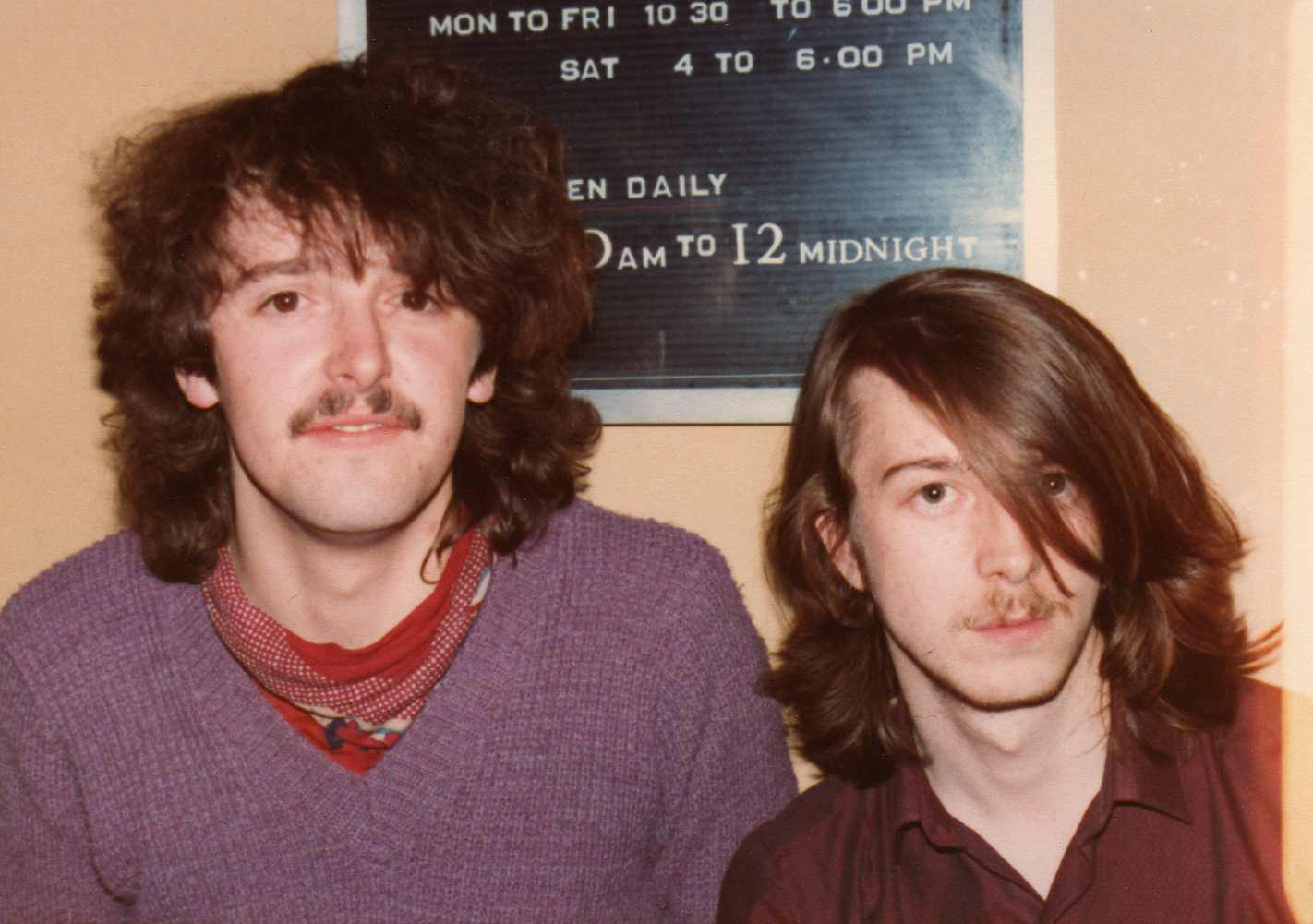
Maconie (right) with Les Flirts bassist Nigel Power, c.1979

While at St John Rigby College, Maconie formed a band named (after several iterations) Les Flirts, featuring Maconie on guitar/vocals, Nigel Power on bass and Jem Bretherton on drums.

== Career ==
In his career as a writer and journalist he has written for Q, Word Magazine, ELLE, The Times, The Guardian, the Evening Standard, Daily Express, Select, Mojo, Country Walking, Deluxe and was an assistant editor for the NME. In September 2008, he began a new monthly column for Cumbria Life magazine. Maconie previously worked as an English and sociology teacher at Skelmersdale College, Lancashire in 1987 and 1988. He has written screenplays for television and films.

Maconie is also the author of Cider with Roadies, an autobiography of his experiences as a music journalist. Pies and Prejudice: In Search of the North, a book that discusses the modern reality of Northern England (as opposed to the popular myths), was published in February 2007, with an audio version following in March 2009. Maconie, portraying himself as a "professional northerner", uses childhood experiences alongside anecdotes from later visits to illuminate the book. A third book, Adventures on the High Teas: In Search of Middle England was published in March 2009. Maconie's March 2012 book, Never Mind the Quantocks, is a collection of more than fifty essays from his monthly column in Country Walking magazine.

Maconie claims to be responsible for two urban legends: that Bob Holness, host of the game show Blockbusters, played the saxophone solo on Gerry Rafferty's hit single "Baker Street" and that David Bowie invented the board game Connect Four. The stories first appeared as blatant jokes in a spoof NME's Believe It or Not feature, but have since been repeated elsewhere as factual.

Maconie also said he was the first to use the term "Britpop" for the British pop music movement of the mid-1990s. John Robb had earlier used the term in 1987 when writing for Sounds. Maconie later said, "I'm sure someone must have used the expression before me about the Hollies, or the Beatles, back in the '60s. But I was the first person to use it about bands like Oasis and Blur".

In February 2023, Roger Waters of Pink Floyd was highly critical of Maconie for an article in the New Statesman which he said misrepresented and misquoted his views on bandmate David Gilmour's musicianship, calling it "shit stirring, ill-informed nonsense."

=== Publications ===
Maconie's books include:

- 3862 Days: The Official History of Blur
- James – Folklore: The Official History
- Cider with Roadies
- Pies and Prejudice: In Search of the North
- Adventures on the High Teas: In Search of Middle England
- Short Stories for Short Breaks
- Never Mind the Quantocks
- The Pie at Night: In Search of the North at Play
- Long Road from Jarrow: A journey through Britain then and now
- The Nanny State Made Me: A Story of Britain and How to Save it
- The Full English: A Journey in Search of a Country and its People

=== Broadcasting ===
As a broadcaster, Maconie has appeared on television and radio.

==== Radio 1 ====
Maconie was a music reporter for Mark Goodier's Evening Session on BBC Radio 1, alongside Andrew Collins. Also on Radio 1, from 1995 to 1997, Maconie presented a music review with Collins called Collins and Maconie's Hit Parade, which was originally broadcast on Mondays from 9 pm to 10 pm and then on Sundays from 3 pm to 4 pm. In addition to this, between October 1996 and late 1997, Maconie hosted a weekly album show on Radio 1 on Sunday nights.

==== Radio 2 ====
Maconie joined BBC Radio 2 in 1998, presenting shows such as All Singing, All Dancing, All Night, a Northern soul music show, and, for several years, Stuart Maconie's Critical List on Saturday evenings. He also presents documentaries and deputised for Johnnie Walker on the Drivetime programme.

From April 2006 to 29 March 2008, Maconie presented the Saturday afternoon show previously presented by Chris Evans.

In addition to his Saturday show, on 16 April 2007, Maconie joined forces with Mark Radcliffe to present a new show on Radio 2 which was broadcast between Monday and Wednesday (Monday to Thursday up to April 2010) from 8 pm to 10 pm. In spring 2011, this show was transferred to Radio 6 Music, 1 – 4 pm weekdays, later moving to weekends from 8 am to 10 am. In 2012, Maconie began presenting The People's Songs, a "story of modern Britain in 50 records". Described as "music as social history", 50 programmes in the series examine periods in Britain, the events that were occurring and how a particular song was the soundtrack of that period.

==== Radio 5 Live ====
From 1994 to 2001, Maconie presented the satirical news review The Treatment on BBC Radio 5 Live.

==== BBC Radio 6 Music ====
Maconie also joined BBC Radio 6 Music at its launch in 2002, where he presents The Freak Zone radio show. It is described as "the weird, the wonderful and all that's in between", and is very diverse in musical content. This show is broadcast every Sunday from 8 pm to 10 pm, and has been supplemented in 2010 with The Freakier Zone, which airs from midnight to 1 am every Saturday/Sunday. In spring 2011, his Radio 2 show with Mark Radcliffe was moved to 6 Music, weekdays 1 – 4 pm. The afternoon show ended on 21 December 2018 and moved to the weekend breakfast show in January 2019.

==== Other broadcasting ====
Maconie has also presented musical specials for BBC Radio 4 and BBC Radio 3, and has appeared on television and in films. In 2007 he presented Stuart Maconie's TV Towns for ITV3, six one-hour shows about TV and film locations in Newcastle, Birmingham, Manchester, Edinburgh, Liverpool and London.

In February 2015 he was the guest of Sarah Walker on BBC Radio 3's Essential Classics. Since 2016 he has appeared on the North of England team on Radio 4's Round Britain Quiz.

=== Other projects ===
Maconie was President of The Ramblers from 2017 to 2023 and is a keen fellwalker. On 20 June 2009, he completed all 214 Wainwrights in Cumbria and is an honorary member of the Wainwright Society, having given their Memorial Lecture in 2006. In late 2009, Experience Northwest released a series of short stories he wrote about the hidden gems in England's Northwest.

== Personal life ==
Maconie is a supporter of Wigan Athletic and Wigan Warriors. In December 2009, Maconie was awarded an honorary Master's degree by Edge Hill University, Ormskirk. The university has a hall of residence called Maconie in his honour.

In July 2011, he was awarded an honorary Doctor of Letters (DLitt) from the University of Bolton.

In January 2016 he became a patron of Warley Woods after a number of years being actively involved.

=== Politics ===
Maconie is politically left of centre and joined the Labour Party at the age of 17. He has commented on Marxism: "In these days of identity politics and what you might call 'the selfie-fication' of political thought, Marxism remains refreshingly bracing in its view of the world."
