= Wendy Smith (singer) =

- Born: 31 May 1963 (age 63); Middlesbrough, North Yorkshire, England
- Occupations: Musician, educationalist
- Instruments: Vocals, keyboards, guitar
- Years active: 1983–present
- Label: Kitchenware Records

Wendy Smith (born 31 May 1963) is an English musician. She was a singer, guitarist and keyboardist in the band Prefab Sprout from 1983 until 2001. In 2015, she became the director of creative learning at The Sage in Gateshead, Tyne and Wear, England.

== Career ==
Smith was born in Middlesbrough, North Yorkshire, England. She joined Prefab Sprout in 1983 after seeing them live in their early concerts, and featured on six of their studio albums as a singer, guitarist and keyboard player. The last album she recorded with the group was 1997's Andromeda Heights, though she remained a member of the band until 2001. One review of Prefab Sprout's second studio album, Steve McQueen, described Smith as having "fairy-dusted [the album with her] breathy harmonies."

After an inactive period of the band in the late 1990s, coupled with Smith being pregnant, she moved first into teaching, and then becoming the head of practitioner development at Sage Gateshead in 2003. She became head of learning and participation at The Sage in 2015.

In 2021, Smith appeared on a single called "Winter Solstice" from poet Simon Armitage's band, LYR.

== Discography ==
=== Collaborations ===
- Contradictions (as Paul Smith and the Intimations) (2015)
