= Kitchenware Records =

UK record label

- Founded: 1982
- Founder: Keith Armstrong, Phil Mitchell, Paul Ludford
- Genre: Various
- Country of origin: United Kingdom
- Location: Newcastle upon Tyne
- Official website: http://www.kitchenwarerecords.com (defunct)

Kitchenware Records was an independent record label based in Newcastle upon Tyne, England. It was founded in 1982 by Keith Armstrong, Paul Ludford and Phil Mitchell, and was originally part of The Soul Kitchen, an artist collective and nightclub.

== 1980s signings ==
One of the label's early signings were Martin Stephenson and the Daintees, whose single "Roll on Summertime" was voted as "single of the week" in Sounds. In the mid-1980s, Kitchenware arranged a deal with Roger Ames' London Records (at the time a semi-independent unit within the PolyGram group) for the group, who licensed them along with soulful pop trio the Kane Gang (both of whom appeared on the label's various artists collection Giant - 14 Brand New Tracks from London Artists in 1987). Around the same time, a deal was also made with CBS Records for the rights to the recordings of Prefab Sprout, an indie pop act fronted by Paddy McAloon. Prefab Sprout were signed to Kitchenware in 1983 and would go on to have a number of top 40 hits, once they allowed their Steely Dan influences to show through. These three acts would feature on a compilation album put out by EMI Records in 1999 called Happy Ever After - The Best of Kitchenware Records alongside lesser known acts such as Geoff Smith, Hug and Hurrah!.

== 21st century re-launch ==
In the early 2000s, Kitchenware was relaunched as a true 'indie' record label and signed bands such as Editors and the Motorettes. Editors were the most successful of Kitchenware's 21st century acts, having gained platinum status with their album The Back Room, which reached number two on the UK Albums Chart. The band's second album, An End Has a Start, brought the label its first UK number-one album upon its 25th anniversary in 2007, whilst third album In This Light and on This Evening also topped the chart. In This Light and on This Evening was to be Editors' last album with Kitchenware, as they signed direct to PIAS, the company which had the licence for the first three Editors album's European releases.

The company dissolved in 2017.

== Artists ==
- Martin Stephenson and the Daintees (licensed in the 1980s to London Records)
- Hurrah!
- The Fatima Mansions (licensed to Radioactive Records)
- Cathal Coughlan (formally of Microdisney/The Fatima Mansions)
- Kane Gang (licensed in the 1980s to London Records, now licensed to DMG's Gary Crowley's Lost 80's Presents... label)
- Prefab Sprout (licensed to CBS Records (Columbia)/Sony Music)
- Geoff Smith
- The Motorettes
- Sirens
- Kid Coda
- The Changes (licensed from Drama Club Records, Chicago, US)
- Karima Francis
- Waiting for Volkaerts
- Kate Walsh
- Hug (licensed to EMI)
- Wushcatte
- Editors
- Smith & Burrows (Tom Smith from Editors/Andy Burrows from Razorlight)
- The Linkmen

== See also ==
- List of independent UK record labels
- List of record labels
