= Roksan Xerxes =

1985 record player

- Xerxes.20plus turntable with Tabriz Zi arm
- Inventor: Touraj Moghaddam
- Inception: 1985
- Manufacturer: Roksan Audio
- Website: Official product page

The Roksan Xerxes transcription turntable (often shortened to Xerxes) is a record player named after the Persian king Xerxes I and produced by London-based Roksan Audio. Designed by Roksan co-founder, Touraj Moghaddam, the Xerxes is a belt-driven turntable with a solid plinth. Launched in 1985, the sound quality of the product positioned it as a strong competitor against the established industry leader, the Linn Sondek LP12. Many reviewers use the Xerxes as a reference turntable.

The production version of the Xerxes is called "Xerxes.20plus", a reference to the 20th anniversary of the launch, in 2005.

== History ==
Before Touraj Moghaddam founded Roksan, he had become dissatisfied with the state of the audio arts when he heard his little television set reproduce Thelonious Monk in a more musically satisfying way than his high-end Linn/Naim tri-amped audio system. Through experimentation, he deduced that the existing turntable design failed because the cartridge was not being held still wherever the groove went. He believed that the mean line traced by the groove relative to the body of the cartridge needed to be constant. His ideas led him away from using the sprung sub-chassis as part of the speed-controlling system. Needing a top plinth roughly an inch (25 mm) thick made from wood with a density of about 700 to 800 kg/m^{3}, Moghaddam found suitable material in a fire door with which he built a prototype. His friend Tufan Hashemi – then an investment analyst – heard the new prototype turntable and wanted one. They agreed to team up to start production; Roksan Audio was formed. The Xerxes, introduced in 1985, secured the advocacy of Roger Macer, a successful independent hi-fi retailer in London who sold the then market leader, the Linn Sondek. Hashemi credits Macer with urging him to start satisfying the demand of "dozens or more a week" from his customers. The product, named after the Persian king Xerxes I, was launched at a hi-fi show in 1985 where the Roksan Darius loudspeaker concept was also unveiled.

=== Design principles ===
Tufan Hashemi said Roksan sought to create equipment that would excel in high-quality musical reproduction and capable of involving the listener on an emotional level. Product characteristics were to include precision and transparency of the sound. Moghaddam, acting as chief designer, set out to find solutions to engineering problems he saw as inherent in the belt-driven suspended sub-chassis turntable design of Edgar Villchur, where the sub-chassis and tonearm are free to rotate. Moghaddam believed that the design generated undesirable torsional modes. One such torsional mode is said to be caused by "groove drag" – dynamic forces exerted by the stylus on the record as it tracked it. Moghaddam chose to attenuate the torsion by mounting the turntable-drive motor casing on its own bearing. The motor, mounted separately and tethered to a spring, is allowed limited rotation about its own axis; because the load varied with groove modulations, the increases in drag would thus be dampened by the spring-loaded motor, and the platter acceleration mitigated. In the words of Tufan Hashemi, Roksan Audio's managing director:

"We argued that using a suspended or floating surface to support a record could not allow it to be accurately read, as the record itself would be floating. We said that the record surface should remain stationary and solid but in complete isolation from the rest of the deck, and our design provided a very stable base for isolating a record without suspending it."

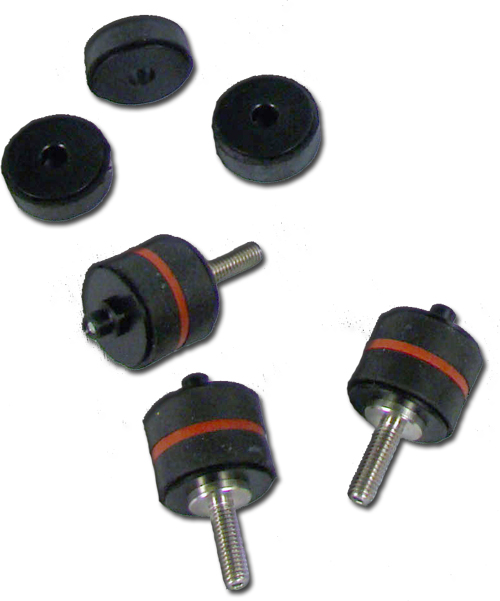
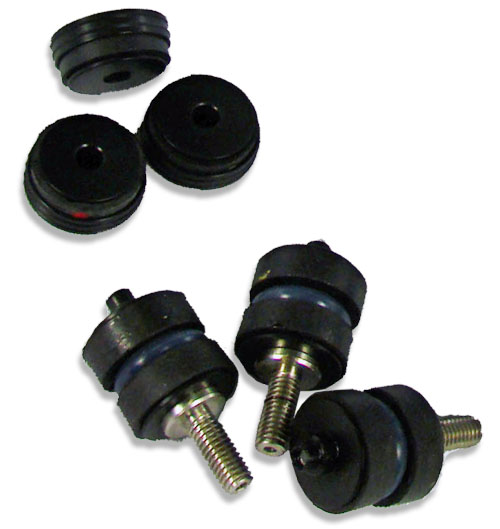
Original Xerxes Blobs (left); TMS Blobs (right)

Like the LP12, the Xerxes has a two-piece platter–sub-platter configuration on which sits a thin felt mat. And while the LP12's platters are made of mazak, the Xerxes' platters are of aluminium. The outer platter is rigid and peripherally weighted. However, the Roksan's outer platter weighs less than half of that of the LP12, to reduce load on the main bearing, yet is able to achieve a greater inertia because of its weight distribution.

A second challenge was how to overcome the rotation of the suspended parts – the sub-chassis, platter, arm and cartridge – relative to the motor. This was done by re-imagining a suspension that had less freedom of lateral movement relative to the drive motor. The Xerxes uses a relatively light medium-density fibreboard (MDF) top board on which the bearing and tonearm assemblies are mounted. Firm rubber "Blobs" mounted on the bottom board (along with the motor assembly) support yet decouple from the top board. Aesthetically, the two boards are encased by a wooden surround fixed to the base board with screws. These design principles can be seen throughout the evolution of the Xerxes, right through to the Xerxes 20plus.

== Construction ==
The original Xerxes design is deliberately a radical departure from the traditional suspended sub-chassis design. Instead of having a three-point sprung suspension separating the plinth from the sub-chassis, the Xerxes is made up of two boards separated from each other by stiff rubber "Blobs". The top plinth sees mountings for the main bearing and tonearm. A hole is cut out from the top board for the motor assembly to emerge from its fixture on the board below. On the lower board, to which an outer surround is attached, three compliant rubber feet give additional isolation to the turntable's chosen placement. One notable characteristic of the deck is the large C-shaped groove cut into the top plinth to control how vibrations would be transmitted from platter to the tonearm area. However, the cut-out is prone to a commonly observed "plinth sag", where the part of it would bend out of true with the rest of the board.

While some other designs use clamps to couple the disc to the platter, Roksan shares the same philosophy as Linn in believing that rigid coupling would cause rumble to be transmitted from the main bearing, thus colouring the sound. To further increase isolation, the Xerxes possesses a spindle that allows the user to centre the record, but which is supposed to be removed during listening so that the disc rests solely on the felt mat.

The bearing-mounted spring-loaded motor is powered by an outboard power supply designated the XPS. Its basic power supply switchable between 33 and 45 rpm. Throughout the years, there have been many changes which have significantly improved this table. The earliest and most important of these was a new main bearing (c. 1989). Other changes include modifications to components such as the outboard power supply, now in its seventh version, and the suspension blobs.

== Partnering ==
=== Tonearms and cartridges ===
Early versions were a platform for mounting third party tonearms. Prior to the launch of Roksan's maiden tonearm, the Artemiz, the Xerxes was most commonly partnered with the Rega RB300 (at the "budget" end), and the SME V (at the "top" end). Other 12-inch arms, like AudioQuest or SME 309, were also chosen by buyers. The Rega was able to function in a way that seemed more synergistic with the Xerxes than the LP12. In both price and performance terms, the original Xerxes, fitted with the Rega RB300 costing £95, became a head-on (and cheaper) alternative to the LP12 fitted with the Linn Ittok arm.

By 2010, Roksan has three tonearms to partner their deck: the Artemiz, the Tabriz (and its 'Zi' version) and the unipivot Nima.

==== Roksan Artemiz ====
Launched in 1987 priced at £350, Artemiz is the flagship tonearm whose design was also a break from established conventions. The arm and headshell is a one-piece construction, with the large-gauge aluminium tube interference-fitting at one end into a massive yoke that houses the bearing; the tube is flat at the other end to provide for mounting the cartridge. The arm is finished in a matt resonant paint. Unusually, there is no finger lift for cueing but the arm is fitted with a conventional lever-operated lift/lower assembly.

The bearing housings at either side, and the vertical bearings above and below the arm tube, are massive, and machined from a single solid piece. The bearings have a pyramidal arrangement: the upper component, consisting of three ball-bearings arranged in a triangle, rests on a single ball-bearing below. The bearings have deliberate play in them which allows movement in response to the dynamic forces when records are tracked.

The Artemiz also possesses an "intelligent counterweight". Its fulcrum is balanced on a stub at the rear of the arm so that its weight is decoupled from the arm and its centre of gravity low. A rider, with a small indentation for the fulcrum, can be moved incrementally along the stub to adjust tracking weight. The pendulum is tuned to 2 Hz, between the frequencies of record warps and of footfalls. Bias is adjustable by a spring and a thread. The arm is wired using Isoda wire made to Roksan's specification. One end is terminated by cartridge tags, and the other has gold-plated RCA phono jacks. The wire has one join, in the arm base, where the thin cartridge wires are melded with sturdier phono leads.

=== Power supplies and accessories ===
In 1989, Roksan introduced the Artaxerxes phono stage – a moving coil phono pre-amplifier designed to sit inside the turntable. Roksan also marketed a three-legged table dedicated to the deck. In 1987 Roksan launched the Shiraz moving coil phono cartridge. In 1989, Roksan launched the budget Radius record player, Tabriz arm and Corus moving magnet cartridge.

== Popularity ==
It was launched in 1985 into already established competition where Linn Sondek LP12 dominated. Other competitors included the Well Tempered Table, the Phonosophie P3, the Michell GyroDec, Pink Triangle, the Dunlop Systemdek, and the Logic DM-101. At its launch, the Xerxes was priced the same as an LP12.

The company was highly influential in the way hi-fi was sold, and it managed to wrest market share from Linn and Naim, who had a stranglehold in the UK. Hi-fi critic Art Dudley observed that prior to Roksan arriving on the scene,

people who valued a component's rhythmic and melodic capabilities had only one real turntable choice, the (still splendid) Linn LP12. But the first Roksan Xerxes was so good, and so superior to the pre-Lingo LP12, that honest listeners among the so-called/self-called 'Flat-Earthers' (Note: Linn/Naim aficionados were nicknamed "flat Earthers", sometimes affectionately, sometimes derogatorily.) had no choice but to say so.

— Art Dudley, quoted in Stereophile, November 2002

The Xerxes is known for its speed stability and its ability to extract information and detail from the record groove. It thus became acceptable to acknowledge good performance from products by companies other than Linn, Naim, and Rega. What Hi-Fi? considered the Xerxes "arguably the first turntable to give the previously all conquering Linn Sondek LP12 a real run for its money".

Throughout the Inspector Morse TV series, the lead character, when seen at home, is often listening to music on his Xerxes. According to the manufacturers, the producers of the show deliberately sought to feature one in the series, from the first episode, to highlight Morse's passion for music. In the first episode, The Dead of Jericho, the people associated with the fictional manufacturer of the turntable (Richards Audio Research) were the focal point of the storyline.

== Versions ==
The Xerxes exists in four distinct versions. The original two-plinth Xerxes (1985) was discontinued after about eight years' production, after the Touraj Moghaddam Signature (TMS) was launched. On the 10th anniversary of the company (1995), Roksan reprised the entry-level Xerxes turntable with a 3-plinth design named Xerxes.X. Its top plinth houses the tonearm and the main bearing, and is isolated from the base by five Blobs, which also allow the plinth to be adjusted in two planes – parallel and perpendicular to the motor and main bearing. The motor is driven by XPS V Reference motor drive, which receives power from DS1.5 Reference Power Supply. (Note: In 2003, the Xerxes with DS1.5sold for £2000 and a lower-cost model supplied with a DSU power unit cost £1750. The Artemiz cost £1000, and the Shiraz £950.)

Sub-chassis assembly for the Xerxes.20

The Xerxes.20 which superseded the Xerxes.X in 2005 incorporated new main bearing ball and the new Rmat-5 sub-plinth. The bearing, attached to the inner platter, has an unusually small-diameter hardened-steel spindle, which sits on top of a tungsten ball that measures 2 mm and is machined to a tolerance in the order of micrometres. The corresponding housing is made of bronze. The two parts of the platter are designed so that their resonances cancel each other out when fitted together.

According to the manufacturer, the Xerxes.20plus incorporates key design elements from the TMS3, including the tungsten carbide bearing ball, inner and outer aluminium platter, mat and decoupler blobs. The isolation between the plinth layers of the 20 has been improved for the Plus. The bearing is of a higher quality; the platter and sub-platter have been redesigned. A mat with distinctive cut-outs is placed on the platter assembly to support the disc. While the top board sits on decoupling blobs, the lower half has bright polished-metal feet. The bearing ball, Blobs and mat are available to existing owners for retrofitting their legacy Xerxes.10 and Xerxes.20 turntables. (Note: In 2011, the Xerxes.20plus cost £2,420; the Tabriz ZI tonearm was priced at £795 (Radius 5 MkII cost £1375 including arm); DS1.5 sold for £1200 and an XPS7 cost £360. The Shiraz £2475.) (Note: The 2013 prices in France: Xerxes 20 Plus: €3,300, Speed Control XPS 7 : €500, Nima : €725, Tabriz : €875, Tabriz ZI : €1,200, Artemiz : €2,850, MM Corus Silver : €600, MC Shiraz)

=== Specifications of the Xerxes.20plus ===
- Main bearing spindle: hardened tool steel
- Roundess & concentricity: < 5 μm
- Length – diameter ratio: 11:1
- Main bearing ball: tungsten carbide
- Roundness: < 1 μm
- Diameter: 2 mm
- Main bearing housing: solid phosphor bronze
- Clearance: 2/1,0000"
- Inner and platter: 2-piece solid aluminium alloy, interference fitted (both)
- Structure: 3-plinth
- Isolation: 3-level decoupling with "blobs"
- Motor: custom made 24-pole synchronous
- Pulley: solid aluminium alloy
- Roundness and concentricity: < 1 μm
- Belt: ground neoprene
- Motor mount: unique synchronising bearing
- Motor drive: external speed controller
- Wow & flutter: < 0.02%
- Rumble: < −80 dB
- Dimensions: 450 mm × 370 mm × 115 mm
- Weight: 12 kg

(Source: UK distributor)
