= Roksan =

British audio product manufacturer

- Type: brand name of Monitor Audio Ltd.
- Industry: Electronics
- Founded: 9 August 1985
- Headquarters: Rayleigh, Essex, England
- Products: Hi-fi, Audiovisual, Amplifier
- Parent: Monitor Audio
- Website: https://www.roksan.com

Roksan is a British manufacturer of high fidelity audio products for domestic use, based in Rayleigh, Essex. It is best known for its influential and innovative design for hi-fi equipment, and in particular its Xerxes platform for playing LP records.

== The company ==
Roksan was formed in 1985 by Tufan Hashemi & Touraj Moghaddam, graduates of the University of London, Imperial College London & Queen Mary College. The company's first product was launched at a hi-fi show in London in 1985.

The name Roksan itself is derived from the name of Roxana, daughter of the Persian King Darius. This closely reflects the Persian heritage and roots of both Hashemi and Moghaddam. Not surprisingly many of Roksan's product names have references to names of cities, places and famous people of Persia (now Iran).

Moghaddam, having then just obtained his PhD at Imperial College, became dissatisfied with the state of the audio arts when he heard his little TV set more musically satisfying than his already high-end Linn/Naim tri-amped audio system, and began experimentation. He deduced that where the existing turntable design failed was that the cartridge must be held still wherever the groove goes, and thus the mean line traced by the groove relative to the body of the cartridge needed to be constant. His ideas led him away from using the sprung sub-chassis as part of the speed-controlling system. Moghaddam built a prototype using a fire door. Hashemi, a friend who had heard the new prototype turntable and wanted one, teamed up to start the company. The Darius loudspeaker design, based on the re-examination of the relationship between and magnitudes of movements of the tweeter and the woofer, was already in prototype. The concept stunned the trade when it was demonstrated at the 1985 hi-fi show where the Xerxes was launched.

In 1990, Roksan employed John Cornock, an Industrial Design graduate from Manchester Polytechnic, to assist in the development of new product lines. He contributed to the aesthetics of the first Radius record player, DP1 CD transport, ROK amplification, Attessa range and the flagship Touraj Moghaddam Signature (TMS) turntable, named after the company's chief designer and founder. In 2002, the TMS2 replaced the TMS turntable. John later rejoined the company to create the aesthetic design for the K3 range of electronics, the all-new Blak range and limited run Oxygene record player.

In 1996, the company was acquired by Verity plc, a hi-fi group that owned the Mission, Wharfedale and Quad brands. But when Verity demerged around two years later to concentrate on flat-panel speaker technology, Hashemi and Moghaddam reacquired their company.

According to public records, Touraj Moghaddam resigned his directorships of Roksan on 15 July 2011. He remains at Vertere Acoustics, where he focuses his efforts on cables.

In November 2016, British HiFi manufacturers Monitor Audio acquired Roksan.

== Products ==
=== Turntables ===
Xerxes.20plus turntable with Tabriz Zi arm

The Xerxes, named after the Persian king who "went around having a good time", has been acclaimed by a number of hi-fi reviewers. This belt-drive turntable without a sprung sub-chassis challenged conventional suspension designs for build and sound quality. It succeeded in finding favour with British "flat-earthers".

The design attacked the "high-ground" by eschewing the spring isolation, which was then regarded as a major strength. Instead, it addressed the issues of Groove drag and lateral rigidity, the ultimate objective of which was to stabilise the relationship between cartridge stylus and the spinning record groove. Springs were not considered sufficiently rigid in the lateral plane, and permitted too much rotation of the suspended parts relative to the motor.

While most other designs relied on inertia (through platter mass) to attenuate the problem, Roksan retained a light platter, but addressed drag by mounting the motor on its own bearing and restricted its long-range movement by a small spring, so that the revolving armature could still drive the system. Xerxes was named #53 "Hot Product" by Stereophile in 2002.

Radius 5 & the Radius 7 are the entry-level turntables, the latter having a high precision and stability speed control built in, designed by Simon Taylor who joined the company in 2013.

=== Loudspeakers ===
Roksan was the first company ever to mechanically isolate the speaker tweeter from the bass unit using springs, in their Darius loudspeaker. This design concept has since been followed by other high end speaker manufacturers.

=== Electronics ===
Roksan now has over 30 different products which include analogue and digital sources, electronics amplification and loudspeakers for audio as well as home cinema.

In 2009, following a philosophy of building high quality components at an affordable price, Roksan launched the K2 stereo integrated amplifier. At a time when British manufacturers had done away with the phono stage for budget products, the K2 was notable in actually having a 47k ohm input for moving-magnet cartridges. The K3 replaced the K2 in 2012, having an uprated power supply and Bluetooth aptX as standard.

2015 saw the introduction of the blak, a new amplifier with a new 'dual monoblock' design, with XLR inputs, bluetooth and a high performance phono input.

On 7th of July 2021, the company released their Attessa range, with a turntable, Amplifier, Streamer Amplifier and CD transport.

The Caspian Series 4G range launched on the 7th October 2024, which included the Caspian 4G Streaming Amplifier and Caspian 4G Integrated Amplifier. The Caspian 4G Streaming Pre-Amplifier and Caspian 4G Power Amplifier were added to the range on the 26th January 2026.

== Milestones ==
- 1985, introduction of the Xerxes turntable.
- 1986, launched the Darius loudspeaker
- 1987, introduced the Artemiz tonearm
- 1987, their first moving coil phono cartridge, the Shiraz, was launched.
- 1988, Roksan's first lifestyle product, the Hot Cake loudspeakers introduced.
- 1989, introduced their first phono amplifier, Artaxerxes, fitted inside the Xerxes, into which plugged directly the tonearm cable.
- 1989, launched the budget Radius record player, Tabriz arm and Corus moving magnet cartridge.
- 1990, first range of electronics, the ROK S1 stereo amplifier and M1 mono amplifier with matching pre amplifiers and power supplies.
- 1991, Roksan's first CD player, the ROK DP1 introduced
- 1991, launched top of the range TMS record player.
- 1992, Roksan replaced the ROK DP1 with the Attessa CD playing system consisting of CD transport, DAC and power supply.
- 1993, production of the new Ojan 3 and 3X loudspeakers started.
- 1994, Rokone loudspeaker was released in a variety of real wood veneers.
- 1994, Attessa and the ROK series of products were fully upgraded to DP3 and ROK 1.5 versions.
- 1995, the 3 plinth 10th anniversary Xerxes.X, implementing design ideas from the TMS, replaced the original Xerxes turntable.
- 1998, the four piece Caspian Audio System (Integrated amplifier, CD player, and FM Tuner) was launched.
- 1999, a digital surround sound processor (DSP), a five-channel AV amplifier and DVD player were added to the Caspian system.
- 2000, Introduction of the new Kandy line, lifestyle starter Audio System.
- 2001, the Caspian phono amplifiers were released.
- 2002, TMS2 replaced the original TMS.
- 2003, release of the Radius 5 turntable and Nima tonearm, and the Roksan set-up LP for record players.
- 2003, Kandy MKIII system, (Kandy integrated amplifier, stereo amplifier, Three channel amplifier, CD player and AM/FM Tuner) released.
- 2004, Caspian M-series (Pre amplifier, mono amplifier, integrated amplifier, stereo power amplifier, phono amplifier, CD player, FM tuner and dedicated Xerxes speed control).
- 2004, released ALTITUDE, its first ever recording of a collection of some very special music from some very talented musicians.
- 2005, 20th anniversary Xerxes.20 replaced the Xerxes.X, incorporated the new improved TMS2 bearing ball and the new Rmat-5 sub-plinth for record players; reference R-series7 mono block, preamplifier
- 2005, Kandy LIII integrated amplifier, power amplifier and CD player
- 2007, Platinum preamplifier and power amplifier
- 2007, Kandy K2 integrated amplifier, power amplifier and CD player
- 2008, TMS3 record player
- 2008, Xerxes 20+ record player
- 2009, Kandy K2 TR5 standmount ribbon speakers
- 2009, Radius 5 Mk-II/Nima record player
- 2010, Caspian M2 integrated amplifier and CD player
- 2011, Caspian M2 power amplifier
- 2012, Oxygene digital integrated amplifier and CD player AptX bluetooth connectivity
- 2013, Kandy K2 BT integrated amplifier with AptX bluetooth connectivity
- 2014, Kandy K3 integrated amplifier with AptX bluetooth connectivity, DAC and CD player
- 2014, Kandy TR5-S2 standmount ribbon speakers
- 2015, Capian VSC series record player speed controls and reference phono stage
- 2016, blak integrated amplifier with AptX bluetooth connectivity, and included DAC
- 2016, blak CD player
- 2016, Radius 7 record player with integrated speed control. Also in glass effect and pink finishes
- 2018, Corus 2 midrange audiophile, moving magnet, vinyl turntable cartridge
- 2019, SARA unipivot tonearm for use with high-quality turntables
- 2021, Attessa range including turntable, Amplifiers and CD Transport
- 2024, Caspian Series 4G range including Streaming Amplifier and Integrated Amplifier.
- 2026, New models added to Caspian Series 4G range including Streaming Pre-Amplifier and Power Amplifier.

== See also ==
- List of phonograph manufacturers
