= Rega =

Rega may refer to:

== Places ==
- Rega (river), a river in north-western Poland, flowing into the Baltic Sea
- Kallepalli Rega, a village in Lakkavarapukota mandal in Vizianagaram district, India
- Pusapati Rega, a village in Vizianagaram district of the Indian state of Andhra Pradesh, India
- Rega, Buner, an administrative unit in the Khyber Pakhtunkhwa province of Pakistan

== Organizations and businesses ==
- Rega (air rescue), a private, non-profit air rescue service of emergency medical assistance in Switzerland and Liechtenstein
- Rega Institute for Medical Research, a scientific establishment belonging to the Catholic University of Leuven in Belgium
- Rega Research, a British audio equipment manufacturer
  - Rega Planar 3, a record player manufactured by Rega Research

== People with the surname ==
- Amedeo Rega (1920–2007), Italian football player
- Chantal Réga (born 1955), French sprinter and hurdler
- Horacio Rega Molina (1899-1957) Argentine poet specializing in sonnets, journalist, and dramatist
- José López Rega (1916–1989), Argentine politician
- Mario Cerciello Rega (1984–2019), Italian police officer murdered by two American teenagers in 2019

== Other uses ==
- The puppet Rega in Rega im Dodley, Israeli TV show for children

== See also ==
- Regas
- Riga (disambiguation)
