= David M. Harland =

British writer and space historian (born 1955)

David M. Harland is an author and space historian. He lives in Scotland. Previously, he was a computer scientist at the University of Glasgow and worked on the Rekursiv project for Linn Products.

== Publications ==
- Polymorphic Programming Languages : Design and Implementation (1984)
- Concurrency and Programming Languages (1986)
- REKURSIV: Object-oriented Computer Architecture (1988)
- The Space Shuttle: Roles, Missions and Accomplishments (1998)
- Jupiter Odyssey: the Story of NASA's Galileo Mission (2000)
- The Earth in Context: a Guide to the Solar System (2001)
- Creating the International Space Station (2002)
- Mission to Saturn: Cassini and the Huygens Probe (2002)
- The Big Bang: a View from the 21st Century (2003)
- The Story of the Space Shuttle (2004)
- The Story of Space Station Mir (2005)
- Water and the Search for Life on Mars (2005)
- Apollo: The Definitive Sourcebook (2006) with Richard W. Orloff
- Apollo EECOM: Journey of a Lifetime Sy Liebergot (2006)
- Space Systems Failures: Disasters and Rescues of Satellites, Rockets and Space Probes (2006)
- Cassini at Saturn: Huygen Results (2007)
- The First Men on the Moon: the Story of Apollo 11 (2007)
- Robotic Exploration of the Solar System: The Golden Era, 1957-1982 (2007) with Paolo Ulivi
- Exploring the Moon: the Apollo Expedition (2008)
- Robotic Exploration of the Solar System. Part 2, Hiatus and Renewal 1983-1996 (2009) with Paolo Ulivi
- How NASA Learned to Fly in Space: An Exciting Account of the Gemini Missions (2010)
- Apollo 12: on the Ocean of Storms (2011)
- Paving the Way for Apollo 11 (2011)
- Robotic Exploration of the Solar System: Part 3: Wows and Woes, 1997-2003 (2012) with Paolo Ulivi
- Robotic Exploration of the Solar System: Part 4: The Modern Era, 2004-2013 (2014) with Paolo Ulivi
- NASA Gemini, 1965-1966 (2015) with W. David Woods
- Enhancing Hubble's Vision: Service Missions that Expanded Our View of the Universe (2016) with David Shayler
- Moon: from 4.5 Billion Years Ago to the Present (2016)
- Mars: from 4.5 Billion Years Ago to the Present (2018)
- Universe: from 13.8 Billion Years Ago to the Infinite Future (2019)
