= Renga (disambiguation) =

Renga may refer to:

- Renga, a genre of Japanese collaborative poetry
- Francesco Renga, Italian singer-songwriter
- La Renga, hard rock Argentine band
- Renga (video game), a 2012 video game

== See also ==
- Rega (disambiguation)
