= Belt-drive turntable =

The functional relationship between the drive belt, sub-platter, and motor pulley, can be seen through the glass platter on a Rega Planar 3.

There are three main types of phonograph turntable drives being manufactured today: the belt-drive, idler-wheel and direct-drive systems; the names are based upon the type of coupling used between the platter of the turntable and the motor. In a belt-drive turntable the motor is located off-center from the platter, either underneath it or entirely outside of it, and is connected to the platter or counter-platter by a drive belt made from elastomeric material.

The design of the belt-drive turntable allows the use of a less expensive motor than the direct-drive turntable. Also, the elastomeric belt absorbs motor vibrations which would otherwise be picked up by the stylus.

== Rotational stability ==
Rotational stability is a key goal for turntable design that produces quality output.

Many belt-drive turntables with multiple speeds have mechanical devices or rely on manual effort to move the belt between different-sized pulleys on the motor shaft. Due to difficulties in designing multiple-speed synchronous motors whose speed can be controlled electronically, such turntables frequently have DC servomotors. The disadvantage of DC servomotors is that they rotate in steps rather than continuously – the resulting "cogging" can add noise during playback. Helical armature motors can be used to overcome this. Problems with belt instability and deterioration in the past have largely been solved by use of modern elastic polymers.

Since the 1970s, DC motors have declined in popularity; high end audiophile turntable designs use the synchronous motor, which are smoother running and lower noise. Due to the existence of instabilities of mains electricity, manufacturers might try to ensure pitch stability by generating its own sinusoidal waveform to power their AC motor. Other methods at achieving stability include using optical sensors on the platter which feed back to the electronics; or use of fly wheel assemblies. Some manufacturers use mass to deal with the problem. Heavy platters, which have higher inertia, are thus less susceptible to minute speed variations. However, mass stores energy that may be difficult to control. Heavier platter also increases wear on the bearing.

== Belt-drive types ==
Some turntables, such as the newer versions of the Rega Planar series, use a fixed plinth with a low vibration motor and bearing attached to the same flat surface, usually constructed of wood, metal or acrylic, without suspension. Others, such as the Linn Sondek LP12, have a suspension.

=== Suspended-sub-chassis ===
The three-point "suspended sub-chassis" was a design by renowned audio pioneer Edgar Villchur. It became the basis upon which his company created the Acoustic Research XA turntable that was launched in 1961. The principle behind it is that the turntable is an inert platform that allows the stylus to track the surface of the record accurately whilst being protected from external vibrations. The platter, sub-chassis, armboard and tonearm mechanically form a closed loop, and sit on top of dampers (usually three springs) which isolate the sub-assembly from its motor and its base. The motor, mounted (directly or indirectly) on the top plate, drives the turntable platter via a belt. The compression spring system of the XA was much improved upon, and popularised in the Linn Sondek LP12. A variation can be found in the Oracle Delphi, where the spring is extended; another variant is the Roksan Xerxes, whose top plate is isolated from the motor bearing assembly by compliant rubber dampers.

The main platter bearing may be upright or inverted, it is mounted on the sub-chassis along with the arm fixture. Bearings generally use an oil film to lubricate between a metal ball-bearing and the thrust-plate of the bearing's housing. More esoteric designs use an air bearing, where the spindle is supported by a high pressure flow of air.

The tonearm is usually sold separately, allowing for buyer choice and upgrades.

== Disadvantages ==
The main disadvantage of belt-drive turntables is the fact that they "ramp" to tempo; they do not instantly play the record at 33 1/3 revolutions per minute, but rather build up to this speed over the course of about one second. This creates an undesirable slurring of the record.

Furthermore, over time the drive belt can wear or lose elasticity, and begin to slip, causing variations in the platter speed. In addition, belt-drive turntables have much lower torque; the belt can also slip off the motor and/or platter spindle, and are thus not suitable for turntablism. DJs who scratch or mix generally prefer to use direct-drive turntables.
