= PT01 =

The PT01 was the first portable belt-driven turntable manufactured by Numark. An identical model called iPT01 was also manufactured by Ion Audio.

== Product features ==
- Built-in phono preamp and speaker; 1/4- and 1/8-inch headphone inputs
- Runs on AC adapter or 6 D-size batteries; 12 by 3.88 by 12 inches (W x H x D)
- Portable turntable with integrated carrying handle, dustcover, and felt slipmat
- Belt-driven motor operates at 33-1/3, 45, and 78 rpm speeds
- Durable auto-start and -stop tonearm; +/- 10 percent pitch control
- Cartridge: Built-in ceramic cartridge, with removable sapphire stylus
