= Rega Planar 3 =

Audiophile turntable by Rega Research

The Rega Planar 3 turntable, shown here without its felt mat. The RB300 arm fitted has a non-standard counterweight

The Rega Planar 3, together with its successors, the P3 and RP3, is a well-known budget audiophile turntable by British hi-fi manufacturer, Rega Research available since 1977. It was a belt-drive deck that broke from convention, by employing a solid plinth in lieu of the compliantly suspended chassis or sub-chassis used in many quality turntables since the early 1960s.

The product has lived through several guises and name changes, any of which are often referred to simply as "Rega 3". It is highly influential, and has made its small British manufacturer's name synonymous with hi-fi turntables, and gave the company the widest brand recognition in this product sector in the US. Its relative simplicity and affordability made the Rega 3 a "bedrock of analog playback for well over 30 years".

In 2016, Rega released its 5th generation of Rega 3 turntables, and returned to its original name, Planar 3. A significant redesign, the 2016 Planar 3 features almost all new parts but still shares its basic engineering with its older siblings.

== History ==
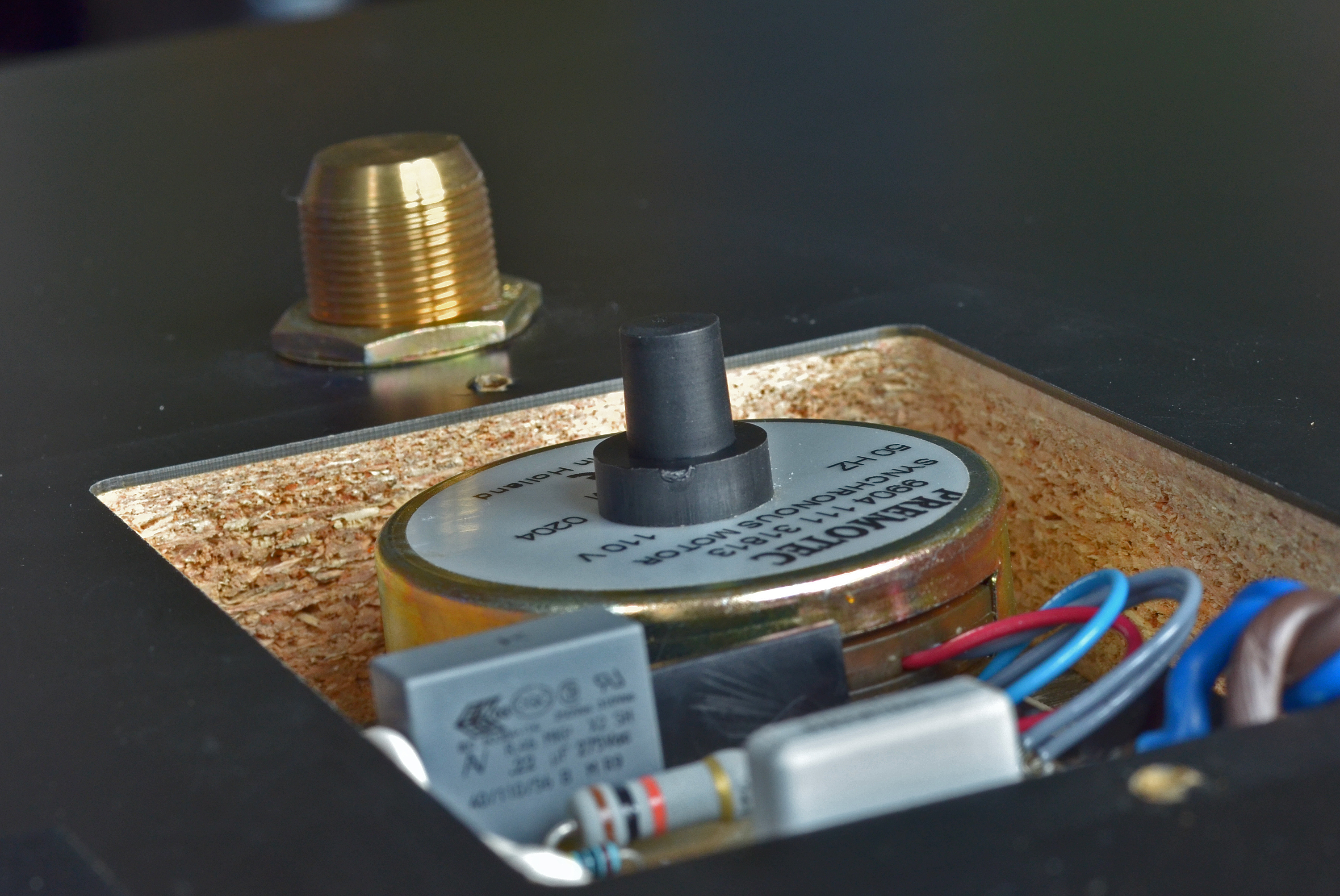
motor and bearing of a Planar 3 viewed from underside

The turntable has been through five principal guises: Planar 3 (1977–2000) (2016-), P3 (2000–2007), P3-24 (2007–2012), RP3 (2012–2016) and Planar 3(P3) (2016-2023 and counting) – this latter supplemented by the P3 50th Anniversary model of 2023. The first Rega turntable, the Planet, was launched in 1975. This was followed by the launch in June 1977 of the Planar 3. The Planar 3 turntable established itself as a "threshold" or entry-level for high quality turntables. It became hugely popular and is one of the most well-known turntables ever produced. A Planar 3 might take centre place in the system of many audiophiles as a "serious turntable" until they could afford the coveted Linn Sondek LP12. It became a reference for simplicity and value, confirming Britain as an important player in the specialist hi-fi industry.

=== Design ===
Speed change: composite image of motor pulley and sub-platter of a Rega Planar 3 (left half: stationary 33 rpm; right half: moving 45 rpm)

Rega went against conventional wisdom of the time, preferring to make their decks lightweight and rigid as a means of controlling unwanted resonances. Their belief was that mass absorbs energy and results in lost music. In other senses, the turntables are deliberately minimalistic and neither require nor justify any 'tweaking' by users, except adjustment to the vertical-tracking-angle (VTA) of the cartridge. It is a belt-driven design incorporating a driving 'sub-platter' mounted on a high quality oil-lubricated bearing, which is fixed directly to a medite (MDF) plinth supported by three simple rubber feet. A heavy glass platter sits atop the sub-platter, which is driven by a mechanically isolated 24V synchronous motor through a rubber belt. A 2mm-thick mat sits on top of the glass platter. The turntable is without suspension, and the rubber feet provide limited mechanical isolation from floor-transmitted vibrations. A perspex cover is provided for some isolation against airborne vibrations. The record deck is single speed – it runs at 33 rpm, and the user must physically remove the platter to reposition the drive belt to play 45 rpm records.

The two major changes to the Planar 3 during its life were firstly the inclusion of the higher quality Rega RB300 tonearm in the 1980s, and the change to a new AC synchronous motor more recently in 2007P3-24. The motor, which had been tuned for lower vibration, allowed for the elimination of the old motor's compliant mounting.

==== 'RB' tonearms ====
The Planet was supplied with an Acos-manufactured R200 tonearm; and until 1983 Planar 3s came with a built-to-order variant of the same tonearm. In 1983, Rega introduced the RB300 tonearm on the Planar 3 turntable whose one-piece die-cast aluminium-alloy tube is the core of all Rega arms. It has higher-tolerance bearings, a decoupled counterweight, a coil-spring–type tracking force adjustment, and higher-quality interconnect cables compared to the RB250 fitted to the Planar 2. The P3-24, (launched in 2007) was fitted with a RB301, which had a new anti-skate mechanism, external tonearm cable, an improved vertical bearing and a new three-point attachment to the plinth instead of a single pillar.

Considered by some to be classics, the Rega tonearms are regarded as offering high value by many reviewers, in the context of the price of the deck. Its high price–performance ratio made the RB300 popular for use with other manufacturers' decks, including, for example, the Linn Sondek. It earned its place as the most widely used OEM tonearm on the market.

=== Comparison with Planar 2 / P2 ===
The Planar 2 was supplied with a RB250 tonearm as against a RB300 on the Planar 3, and is available only in black finish. Earlier models had a glass platter, wood surround-frame plinth and S-shaped arm; Rega changed to using a fibreboard platter on the P2 which it describes as being "CNC machined HDF which is then metalised [sic], giving a platter with good mass and accuracy." Compared to the Planar 2, the Rega Planar 3 has a thicker, heavier plinth; the drive motor is mounted on the plinth using a rubber suspension for improved isolation. The glass platter is also thicker, as is the felt mat.

In 2003, Lim Juan of The Star speculated that the revised P2 looked "a lot less substantial than its ancestor", because of cost-cutting. Whilst the platter of the costlier Rega decks, P3 and P25, continued to be of glass, reviewers derided the fibreboard platter of the P2 as "not inspiring much confidence". The plinth, which the Rega website described as a low mass particulate core sandwiched by highly rigid phenolic laminates, "looks like any plain cheap medite board", according to Lim. The badly toleranced medite platter proved unpopular with prospective buyers so Rega reverted to glass platters for a while, until the P2 was discontinued in 2005.

On the discontinuation of the P2, the P3 became Rega's entry-level turntable until the company relaunched the P1 in 2006 (at $350 including arm and cartridge) to compete with offerings from Music Hall and Pro-Ject. In late 2006 / early 2007, the P2 was resurrected once again, with different platter – thicker than before at 22mm, and weightier. When giving their verdicts, audio reviewers often advised readers to pay a little extra for the P3 over the P2.

=== Evolution ===
RP3

Elevated frontal view

Close-up showing its phenolic resin brace

The Rega Planar 3 was updated and renamed the P3 in 2000, and started being made available in a range of bright colours. The P3-24, in the name of the 24-pole AC synchronous motor used – same for the costlier P5 and P7 decks, was released (in 2007). A separate power supply drives the "very low vibration" motor directly mounted on the table. The P3-24 may be used with an optional external power supply designed for the P7 that gives a stable voltage to drive the motor and which allows for two-speed operation (33 and 45 rpm) without requiring manual speed change. The plinth of the P3-24 and more recent models, constructed of laminates with a 0.9mm phenolic resin skin instead of MDF, is custom-made by a Scottish kitchen cabinet supplier.

In superseding the Rega P3-24 with the RP3, Rega made improvements to the bearing, arm, and plinth. Rega co-founder and chief designer Roy Gandy realised the plinth could be made lighter if thicker bracing was installed at key points to make the structure stronger and stiffer. It was found that after a 2mm-thick brace was incorporated on the top and bottom of the plinth, the phenolic skin could be dispensed with. The RB301 tonearm fitted to its predecessor was changed to the RB303, which has a now tapered cast alloy tube that offered greater rigidity and better control of resonance.

The latest generation Planar 3, released in 2016, is a wholesale improvement on the classic. Rega reports that only 2 part assemblies remain unchanged from the prior RP3 model, the dustcover and dustcover hinges. Significant revisions to plinth, platter, tonearm show net improvements in fit and finish, as well as performance. The new plinth is an MDF core with a high-pressure acrylic laminate finish, and thicker braces, for improved strength and aesthetics, lowering noise floor and improving response. The main bearing well has been completely redesigned to reduce pressure on the ball bearing and hub, while allowing for a higher tolerance assembly, netting smoother operation and lower noise. A new hub (subplatter) is constructed of polycarbonate, reshaped to improve contact with the platter and lower overall resonance of the main bearing/hub/platter assembly. The 12mm platter is a new glass material, dubbed Optiwhite, is noticeably clearer in appearance and is said to be machined to higher tolerance which improves rotational stability. The old RB303 tonearm has been replaced by a new RB330 version of the classic, with patent pending "zero-tolerance" bearings, stiffer vertical bearing housing, redesigned bias (anti-skate) housing, improved three-point plinth mounting, a new arm tube coating, and new arm wiring. The 24V AC synchronous motor has a new control PCB and housing cover for greater consistency during assembly and improved reliability, and the power switch has been relocated under the plinth for better ergonomics. New feet are said to lower noise transfer into the turntable, via a new stiffer, wider, hollow cone design constructed from Santoprene rubber. As always, the Planar 3 is still produced in Rega's UK manufacturing plant located in Southend-on-Sea, Essex UK. Remarkably, the 2016 Planar 3 only rose in price nominally from its predecessor, revealing the benefits of Rega's increased manufacturing capacity and popularity.

== Reception ==
=== Sound quality ===
Ross at Vinyl Asylum regarded the original Rega's overall sonic presentation as "much more refined than a typical Dual" (referring to the Dual 505) or similarly priced Japanese turntables. He found fault, however, in a number of parameters, such as average transient response, not enough sense of depth, a higher than expected noise floor, and some slurring of musical notes and details – such as individual voices among a small group of singers.

In the mid-1980s, Sam Tellig wrote in Stereophile that the Rega 3 "is a good-sounding turntable and a good value—at the UK price ... it's a miracle that the Rega sounds as good as it does" compared with the apparently better built Harman-Kardon T60. From a sound quality viewpoint, Tellig noted "a very dynamic sound with powerful, punchy bass—the table conveys the music's excitement... [but with] too much emphasis of the mid- to upper-bass [and] tends to sound a little muddy in bass detail". He added that the deck's pitch instability was audible "every so often, particularly with woodwinds". Szabady, in Stereo Times, also agreed that musical expressiveness was the classic Planar 3 strength; its weaknesses included occasional speed inconsistency and slurring of heavily modulated bass transients.

HiFi Choice said in 1984 that the Planar 3 sounded "nicely musical in a balanced and coherent manner. Presentation of detail was considered well above average"; in 1992 it asserted that the Rega Planar 3 has been "a long time leader" under £250. Michael Fremer wrote in December 1996 that "while the 2 did nothing really wrong, the 3 offered somewhat deeper and tighter bass, better dynamics at both ends of the scale, a better sensation of 'quiet', and smoother overall performance". Considered on its own terms, the Rega 3 was "quiet, dynamic, free of obvious tracking distortion or other supposed analog problems, extremely well-balanced top to bottom, offers very deep and reasonably tight bass". In comparison with the $9000 TNT Mk.3/Immedia RPM, recordings sounded "more like a recording and less like real life on the Rega 3".

Brent Burmester said in Audioenz in 2005 that, compared to the already discontinued Rega 2, the Rega 3 is "tauter, faster, just a little quieter... and better in all the dimensions in which the P2 is already strong. My only niggle was the slight hollowness invested in the lower-midrange". Burmester described the P3 sound as "dynamic, expressive ... fresh and enthusiastic feel, not quite but nearly weaving the illusion that you're sitting in the third row of the auditorium or the engineer's booth at the recording studio. [It] sounded 'newer', more together, sharper, more focused. It's a contemporary sound, not a million miles from well sorted CD players of three times the price".

Writing in Secrets of Home Theater and High Fidelity in 2012, Jim Clements said of the RP3 that it has "several meaningful advances over the P3-24 [that] help the RP3 operate with low background noise and an innate ability for detail retrieval. This table also conveys above average dynamic shadings while providing a solid foundation to support the whole frequency balance of your cartridge." Writing in The Absolute Sound, Wayne Garcia appraised that "the RP3 is sonically superior to its predecessor in every way." Stereophile said it "retained the P3-24's fast, forgiving sound, but added tighter and better-controlled low frequencies".

=== Popularity and accolades ===
The Regar Planar 3 is one of the better-known turntables in the history of hi-fi. Jim Clements said that the Rega 3 in its various incarnations "is probably one of the best-selling turntable lines in the history of the world". Audiogon notes that "the Planar 3 or the current P3 it has remained a bedrock of analog playback for well over 30 years". Techradar notes that "Few hi-fi components have lived longer or exerted greater influence than Rega's Planar 3 turntable". Jeff Dorgay said that "P3 is not only the 'table that put Rega on the map in the US but the one that gave the company the widest brand identity".

The P3-24 was both a "Joint Analog Source" and a "Joint Budget Component" for 2008. In 2012, the RP3 won Stereophile's "Analog Source Component of the Year" and What Hi-fi? voted it Product of the Year in the category of Best Turntable £500-£750.

Various aspects of a slightly modified Rega Planar 3 without its standard felt mat

Arm/cartridge (Ortofon cartridge) and logo

On–off switch

Platter and RB300 arm (modified counterweight)

Side view (modified feet)
