= Inspector Morse (TV series) =

British television detective series (1987–2000)

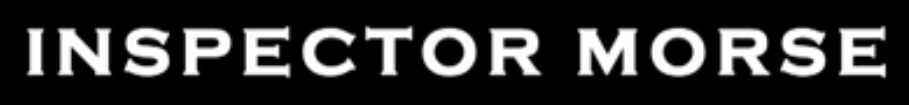
- Logo used from Series 4
- Genre: Crime drama Murder mystery Detective fiction
- Created by: Colin Dexter
- Based on: Inspector Morse by Colin Dexter
- Developed by: Anthony Minghella; Kenny McBain
- Starring: John Thaw; Kevin Whately; James Grout
- Theme music composer: Barrington Pheloung
- Country of origin: United Kingdom
- Original language: English
- No. of series: 7 series (1987–1993) and 5 specials (1995–2000)
- No. of episodes: 33 (list of episodes)

Production
- Executive producer: Ted Childs
- Running time: 98–105 minutes
- Production companies: Zenith Productions; Central Independent Television; Carlton Television

Original release
- Network: ITV
- Release: 6 January 1987 – 15 November 2000

Related
- Lewis; Endeavour

Inspector Morse is a British detective drama television series based on a series of novels by Colin Dexter. It stars John Thaw as Detective Chief Inspector Morse and Kevin Whately as Sergeant Lewis. The series comprises 33 two-hour episodes (100 minutes excluding adverts) produced between 6 January 1987 and 15 November 2000. Dexter made uncredited cameo appearances in all but three of the episodes.

In 2018, the series was named the greatest British crime drama of all time by Radio Times readers. In 2000, the series was ranked 42 on the 100 Greatest British Television Programmes compiled by the British Film Institute.

It was followed by the spin-off Lewis, and the prequel Endeavour.

== Overview ==
The series was made by Zenith Productions for Central Independent Television, and first shown in the UK on the ITV network of regional broadcasters. Between 1995 and 1996 the commissioning company was Carlton Television, and towards the end of the series it was a joint venture by Carlton and WGBH.

Every episode involved a new murder investigation and depicted a complete story. Writer Anthony Minghella scripted three, including the first, "The Dead of Jericho", which aired on 6 January 1987 and featured guest actors Gemma Jones, Patrick Troughton, and James Laurenson. Its other writers included Julian Mitchell (10 episodes), Daniel Boyle (five), and Alma Cullen (four), and its directors included John Madden (four episodes), Herbert Wise (three), Peter Hammond (three), Adrian Shergold (three), and Danny Boyle (two).

Inspector Morse is frequently repeated on the subsidiary ITV channel ITV3 in the UK, although repeat broadcasts also aired on Channel 4 during the show's original run. Repeats are also shown on television channels in other European countries, Australia and the United States.

== Episodes ==
Series	Episodes	Originally released	
Series	Episodes	First released	Last released
1	3	6 January 1987	20 January 1987
2	4	25 December 1987	22 March 1988
3	4	4 January 1989	25 January 1989
4	4	3 January 1990	24 January 1990
5	5	20 February 1991	27 March 1991
6	5	26 February 1992	15 April 1992
7	3	6 January 1993	20 January 1993
8	5	29 November 1995	15 November 2000

== Cast and crew ==
Main characters

- John Thaw as Detective Chief Inspector Endeavour Morse
- Kevin Whately as Detective Sergeant Robbie Lewis
- James Grout as Chief Superintendent Strange

Other recurring characters

- Peter Woodthorpe as Dr Max DeBryn (pathologist) in series 1–2
- Amanda Hillwood as Dr Grayling Russell (pathologist) in series 3
- Clare Holman as Dr Laura Hobson (pathologist) in specials
- Norman Jones as Chief Inspector/Superintendent Bell in series 1
- Judy Loe as Adele Cecil in series 8

Main production credits

- Kenny McBain, producer of series 1–2
- Chris Burt, producer of series 3, 7 and specials
- David Lascelles, producer of series 4–5
- Deirdre Keir, producer of series 6
- Ted Childs, executive producer
- Rebecca Eaton, American executive producer of episodes 31–33
- Laurie Greenwood, associate producer

== Notable guest cast and future stars ==
Episode	Actors
"The Dead of Jericho" (1987)	Gemma Jones, Patrick Troughton, James Laurenson, Spencer Leigh, Annie Lambert, Richard Durden
"The Silent World of Nicholas Quinn" (1987)	Michael Gough, Clive Swift, Frederick Treves, Barbara Flynn, Roger Lloyd-Pack, Anthony Smee
"The Service of All the Dead" (1987)	Angela Morant, John Normington, Maurice O'Connell, Judy Campbell, Michael Horden
"The Wolvercote Tongue" (1987)	Simon Callow, Kenneth Cranham, Roberta Taylor, Robert Arden, Christine Kavanagh
"Last Seen Wearing" (1988)	Peter McEnery, Suzanne Bertish, Glyn Houston, Frances Tomelty, Fiona Mollison, Philip Bretherton, Elizabeth Hurley, Julia Sawalha
"The Settling of the Sun" (1988)	Anna Calder-Marshall, Derek Fowlds, Robert Lang, Robert Stephens, Avis Bunnage, Amanda Burton
"Last Bus to Woodstock" (1988)	Anthony Bate, Terrence Hardiman, Fabia Drake, Jill Baker, Holly Aird, Paul Geoffrey
"Ghost in the Machine" (1989)	Patricia Hodge, Clifford Rose, Bernard Lloyd, Michael Godley, Michael Thomas, Patsy Byrne, Irina Brook
"The Last Enemy" (1989)	Barry Foster, Michael Aldridge, Tenniel Evans, Beatie Edney, Siân Thomas
"Deceived by Flight" (1989)	Norman Rodway, Sharon Maughan, Daniel Massey, Jane Booker, Nicky Henson, Bryan Pringle, Geoffrey Beevers, Nathaniel Parker
"The Secret of Bay 5B" (1989)	Mel Martin, Marion Bailey, Andrew Wilde, Philip McGough, George Irving
"The Infernal Serpent" (1990)	Cheryl Campbell, Barbara Leigh-Hunt, Geoffrey Palmer, Tom Wilkinson, Pearce Quigley, Irene Richard, George Costigan
"The Sins of the Fathers" (1990)	John Bird, Isabel Dean, Lisa Harrow, Lionel Jeffries, Alex Jennings, Betty Marsden, Paul Shelley, Kim Thomson
"Driven to Distraction" (1990)	Patrick Malahide, David Ryall, Christopher Fulford, Mary Jo Randle
"Masonic Mysteries" (1990)	Diane Fletcher, Richard Kane, Ian McDiarmid, Iain Cuthbertson, Mark Strong
"Second Time Around" (1991)	Kenneth Colley, Pat Heywood, Ann Bell, Oliver Ford Davies, Christopher Eccleston, Adie Allen
"Fat Chance" (1991)	Maurice Denham, Zoë Wanamaker, Maggie O'Neill, David Gant, Kenneth Haigh, Peggy Mount, Nicholas Selby, Tilly Vosburgh
"Who Killed Harry Field?" (1991)	Geraldine James, Freddie Jones, John Castle, Nicola Cowper, Ronald Pickup, Trevor Byfield
"Greeks Bearing Gifts" (1991)	Martin Jarvis, Jan Harvey, James Hazeldine, James Faulkner, Richard Pearson, Eileen Way, Andrew Kazamia, Eve Adam, Carole Ashby, Jonny Lee Miller
"Promised Land" (1991)	Rhondda Findleton, John Jarratt, Max Phipps, Con O'Neill, Noah Taylor, Peter Browne
"Dead on Time" (1992)	Joanna David, Samantha Bond, David Haig, Adrian Dunbar, Richard Pasco, Dominic Keating
"Happy Families" (1992)	Anna Massey, Gwen Taylor, Alun Armstrong, Rupert Graves, Charlotte Coleman, Andrew Ray, Sukie Smith, Martin Clunes, Jonathan Coy, Jamie Foreman
"Death of the Self" (1992)	Frances Barber, Michael Kitchen, Georges Corraface, Alan Rowe, Jane Wenham, Peter Blythe
"Absolute Conviction" (1992)	Diana Quick, Sean Bean, Jim Broadbent, Suzanna Hamilton, Richard Wilson, Tony Steedman, Robert Pugh, Cheryl Hall, James Aubrey, Steven Mackintosh, Pete Lee-Wilson, Jonathan Firth, Phil Davis, Sue Johnston
"Cherubim & Seraphim" (1992)	Isla Blair, Sorcha Cusack, Jason Isaacs, John Junkin, Paul Brightwell, Liza Walker, Charlotte Chatton, Anna Chancellor, Christopher Benjamin, Larrington Walker
"Deadly Slumber" (1993)	Brian Cox, Janet Suzman, Penny Downie, Jason Durr, Carol Starks, Ian McNeice, Robert Swann, Patrick Godfrey, Penny Downie, Su Elliot
"The Day of the Devil" (1993)	Harriet Walter, Richard Griffiths, Keith Allen, Gilly Coman, Patrick O'Connell, Lloyd McGuire, Richard Graham, Patrick Drury, Jacqueline Leonard, Michael Culver, Gavin Richards, Kevin Stoney
"Twilight of the Gods" (1993)	Sir John Gielgud, Robert Hardy, Sheila Gish, Jean Anderson, Alan David, Rachel Weisz, John Bluthal, Julian Curry, Don Fellows, Joan Blackham, Allan Corduner, Brian Bovell, Julie Legrand, Doug Bradley, Billy Hartman, Iain Rattray
"The Way Through the Woods" (1995)	Nicholas Le Prevost, Malcolm Storry, Neil Dudgeon, Michelle Fairley, Gary Powell, Christopher Fairbank, John Malcolm, Robin Soans, Neil Dudgeon, Kay Stonham, Simon Scott, Alex Giannini, Shaun Williamson
"The Daughters of Cain" (1996)	Phyllis Logan, Gabrielle Lloyd, Tony Haygarth, Benjamin Whitrow, Amanda Ryan, Bernard Brown, Dominic Brunt, Lynn Farleigh, Nadim Sawalha
"Death is Now My Neighbour" (1997)	Richard Briers, Maggie Steed, John Shrapnel, Roger Allam, Mark McGann, Julia Dalkin, Susan Engel, Colin McCormack, Ben Caplan, Ashley Gunstock
"The Wench is Dead" (1998)	Lisa Eichhorn, Matthew Finney, Philip Quast, Jeff Nuttall, Michael Culkin, Juliet Cowan, Sarah Lam, Roger Llewellyn, Osmund Bullock
"The Remorseful Day" (2000)	Paul Freeman, T. P. McKenna, Anna Wilson-Jones, Jesse Birdsall, Helen Pearson, Aidan J. David, Colin Spaull, Barbara Lott, Annette Ekblom, Sharon Maiden, Barrington Pheloung

== Production ==
Sergeant Lewis (left) and Inspector Morse

This television adaptation of the Inspector Morse novels was brought to the screen by Scottish producer Kenny McBain, who had previously produced the series Boon for Central Independent Television. He brought in a team of writers including Charles Wood, Anthony Minghella and Julian Mitchell, and insisted that the series occupied a two-hour slot in the schedule, making it the first British drama to try a two-hour feature-length format. Morse was played by John Thaw and his assistant, Detective Sergeant Lewis, by Kevin Whately. The character of Lewis was transformed from the elderly Welshman and ex-boxer of the novels to a much younger Geordie police sergeant with a family, as a foil to Morse's cynical streak. Morse's first name, Endeavour, is revealed on only one occasion, when he explains to a lady friend that his father was obsessed with Captain James Cook, so he was named after HMS Endeavour. On other occasions, he usually answers, "Morse. Everyone just calls me Morse", or dryly replies "Inspector", when asked what his first name is.

Thaw appreciated that Morse was different from many other classic detectives such as Hercule Poirot and Sherlock Holmes. Morse was brilliant, but he was not always right. He often arrested the wrong person or came to the wrong conclusion. Morse was also a romantic, frequently mildly and gently flirting with or asking out colleagues, witnesses, or suspects — occasionally bordering on the unprofessional — but he had little success in love.

Morse is a character whose talents and intelligence are being wasted in positions that fail to match his abilities. It is mentioned several times that Morse would have been promoted above and beyond Chief Inspector at Thames Valley Police CID, but his cynicism and lack of ambition, coupled also with veiled hints that he may have made enemies in high places, frustrate his progression despite his Oxford connections. In the episode "Second Time Around", it is revealed that Morse opposed capital punishment and long sentences, which was upheld by his former superior who later became assistant commissioner of the Metropolitan Police, and his former colleague thought of him as "a poor policeman and a very good detective".

Morse's eventual death in the final episode "The Remorseful Day" is caused by heart problems exacerbated by heavy drinking, although in the books his death is diabetes-related.

Inspector Morse was filmed for ITV using 16 mm film stock. Since its production, a number of releases of the show on DVD have been made using various remastered editions of the episodes in the 4:3 ratio. In recent years, ITV has overseen a high-definition restoration of the drama from the original 16 mm negatives so as to boost the HD content on ITV3 HD. Many of these HD episodes retain the original 4:3 ratio, though some of the later episodes (including the series finale) have been opened into a 16:9 widescreen frame. These more recent remastered editions have not been released on Blu-ray.

== Morse's interests ==
Morse had diverse passions: music (especially opera, with Wolfgang Amadeus Mozart and Richard Wagner among his favourite composers), poetry, art, the classics, British real ale, classic cars and cryptic crossword puzzles. When seen at home, Morse is usually listening to music on his Roksan Xerxes record player, solving a crossword, reading classic literature - for instance, Jude the Obscure in season 2, episode 2's Last Seen Wearing - or drinking ale. In his home, the living room had a chess set containing classical Staunton chess pieces, while the art on the walls includes etchings of Roman ruins by G.B. Piranesi from his Vedute di Roma series. While working, Morse subsists on quickly downed pints of ale (preferably real ale) in pubs, usually bought by Lewis, who struggles to keep up. Many of his cases touch on Morse's interests and often his knowledge helps him solve them.

In "The Death of the Self", the episode ends with Morse seeing one of the characters, an opera singer recovering from a long absence due to stage fright, make her "comeback" performance at the amphitheatre in Verona, while, in "Twilight of the Gods", he investigates the life of one of his opera idols, Gwladys Probert, a world-famous soprano. In "Who Killed Harry Field?", the murder victim is a painter and in "The Way Through the Woods", Morse researches the Pre-Raphaelite movement to aid his investigations.

In several episodes, Morse's crossword-solving ability helps him to spot people who have changed their identities by creating a new name using an anagram. In "Masonic Mysteries", he is maliciously implicated in the murder of a woman when his Times newspaper with the crossword puzzle completed in his handwriting is placed in the victim's house. In that same episode, the writer names Morse's old inspector from when he was a detective sergeant as "Macnutt", an homage to D.S. Macnutt, the famous and influential Observer puzzle setter 'Ximenes'.

In "The Sins of the Fathers", he investigates a murder in a brewery-owning family and, in the first episode of the series, "The Dead of Jericho", he compares the life of a dead woman with that of Jocasta, the mother of Oedipus. The same episode also introduced his Jaguar Mark 2 automobile, which is damaged at the beginning and the end of the story, being used to prevent the escape of the perpetrators. His interest in classic cars is also explored in "Driven to Distraction", in which he suspects a car salesman of murder. He seems to dislike Jeremy Boynton so strongly that, when he refers to Morse's own Jaguar as "she", this convinces Morse of his guilt.

In "Cherubim and Seraphim", he investigates the suicide of his niece and discusses with her English teacher her interest in the poet Sylvia Plath, who also killed herself. The teacher defends the teaching of Plath's poetry to students, saying that her suicide would not influence students to do the same. Investigating the killing of a retired detective in "Second Time Around", Morse is haunted by an early case of his in which a young girl had been murdered and an obvious suspect could have very well been innocent.

== Music ==
Music used during the end credits
Sample of the music used during the end credits of Inspector Morse, including the Morse code motif.

The theme and incidental music for the series were written by Barrington Pheloung and used a motif based on the Morse code for "MORSE": (--/---/.-./.../.). The composer works the five letters into four three-beat bars as follows :

The motif is played solo at the beginning and recurs all the way through. In the documentary, The Mystery of Morse, Pheloung states that he occasionally spelled out the name of the killer in Morse code in the music, or alternatively spelled out the name of another character as a red herring. The series also included opera and other classical genres as part of its soundtrack, most notably pieces by Richard Wagner and Wolfgang Amadeus Mozart, whose Magic Flute is a significant plot device in one episode.

== Locations ==
Beaumont College (in the TV episode "The Last Enemy") and Lonsdale College (in "The Riddle of the Third Mile", the book on which "The Last Enemy" was based) are both fictional Oxford colleges. The real Brasenose College and Exeter College were used to represent Lonsdale, while Corpus Christi was used for Beaumont. Both fictional names are from real streets in Oxford; a real Lonsdale College exists at Lancaster University (named after the adjacent Lancashire region of Lonsdale Hundred, as is the Oxford street) but has no relation to Dexter's fictional Lonsdale. St Saviour's College in the episode "Fat Chance" is also fictitious; New College was used as the location for it. Merton and University College were used for the fictional Beaufort College in the episode "The Infernal Serpent". Christ Church appears in "The Daughters of Cain" as the fictional Wolsey College; it was founded by Thomas Wolsey. In a number of episodes, the main quad at Wadham College is used, especially the classic view as seen from the main entrance — unlike the students, the actors were allowed to walk on the grass. Eton College was used to depict various parts of Oxford through the series, notably the county court in the episode "The Silent World of Nicholas Quinn", while St John's Beaumont School, Old Windsor, became the Foreign Examinations Syndicate in the same episode, with both external and internal filming taking place there. Many of the generic locations used throughout the series, including Morse's house, were situated in Ealing, London, amongst the residential streets to the north of Ealing Broadway. Some scenes were also filmed at Brunel University and Hillingdon Hospital, both in west London. The Port of Dover was used for the "Deceived by Flight" episode.

== Props ==
The Regency red 1960 Jaguar Mark 2 2.4L car (with number plate 248 RPA) used by Morse throughout the television series became synonymous with the main character, despite Morse's driving a Lancia in the early novels. (After the start of the TV series, the novels changed to the Jaguar, but no reference is made in the books as to why or when Morse changes cars. However, Colin Dexter was impressed by the idea of the Jaguar, suggested by John Thaw, and had the Lancia changed to a Jaguar in subsequent reprints of his stories.) The Jaguar was given away in a competition a year after filming ended and in 2002, it was auctioned for £53,200, many times the going rate for a "normal" 2.4. In November 2005, it was sold again for more than £100,000.

== Spin-offs ==
=== Lewis ===
The spin-off Lewis, starring Kevin Whately as the now promoted (and widowed, making the character's situation closer to Morse's) Inspector Lewis, premiered in 2006 on ITV. Nine series were made, with the last concluding in November 2015. It was broadcast in the United States on PBS under the title Inspector Lewis. On 2 November 2015, ITV announced that the show would end after its ninth series, following the decision made by Kevin Whately and Laurence Fox to retire from their roles in the series. Whately announced that the show had "gone on long enough", with his character having done many stories between Morse and Lewis after he took on the role thirty years prior.

=== Endeavour ===
In 2012, ITV aired a two-hour special prequel film, Endeavour, portraying a young Morse, with author Colin Dexter's participation. It is set in 1965, with Shaun Evans playing the young Detective Constable Morse, who is preparing to hand in his resignation when he becomes involved in an investigation into a missing schoolgirl. This was followed in 2013 by the first series, consisting of four episodes. Filming for the ninth and last series, set in 1972, began on 22 May 2022 and ended on 26 August 2022. In the UK, the three episodes of the final series were broadcast between 26 February and 12 March 2023. In the United States the episodes were broadcast by the Public Broadcasting Service between 18 June and 2 July.
