= Ivor Tiefenbrun =

Scottish Conservative Party politician

Ivor Sigmund Tiefenbrun
- Born: March 1946; Glasgow
- Occupations: Engineer, businessman

Ivor Sigmund Tiefenbrun MBE (born March 1946) is the founder and chairman of Linn Products Ltd, Glasgow-based manufacturers of high-fidelity audio equipment and home theatre equipment. He was influential in the manufacture and retail of British audio in the 1970s and 1980s, and was appointed MBE by Elizabeth II in 1992.

== Biography ==
Tiefenbrun was born in the Gorbals area of Glasgow, the oldest of three children, to Jan (also known as Jack, but originally Hansel) Tiefenbrun and Leah Katzenell Tiefenbrun, a Jewish couple. Jack was born in Kraków and arrived in Glasgow as a Kindertransport refugee from Austria in 1939.

Tiefenbrun dropped out of a mechanical engineering degree from the University of Strathclyde in Glasgow, and developed his engineering and business skills in his late father's company, Castle Precision Engineering, now run by his nephew (also named Jan).

Linn Products Limited was started by Tiefenbrun in the city's Castlemilk district near Linn Park in 1972 to manufacture a hi-fi turntable, developed from his personal interest in music reproduction, based on contemporary models. His approach was to strive to extract much more information from the long-play gramophone record (otherwise known as the LP), and to make the turntable immune to audio feedback. He thought that precision engineering of the turntable would prove to be far more important than many other designers believed The end product was the Linn Sondek LP12 which remains in production after nearly five decades.

In the early years, Tiefenbrun took the turntable around shops trying to prove that not all turntables sounded the same. Tiefenbrun also argued against industry notables like Edgar Villchur, who felt that loudspeakers were the most important aspect of the audio playback chain, instead asserting the primacy of "the front end" (that the quality of the source was key to hi-fidelity music reproduction). He said that once information was lost, distorted or corrupted, it was gone forever and could never be retrieved.

Many of the dealers who auditioned the turntable felt they heard an improved sound when compared to other brands. By the end of the 1970s, Tiefenbrun's views had gained significant ground and large numbers of dealers and audiophiles had accepted "primacy of the source" as the norm in the United Kingdom and then around the world.

Ivor is outspoken, irreverent, highly opinionated, a brilliant and original thinker, and one of the most fascinating conversationalists either of us has met.

— John Atkinson & Robert Harley

Tiefenbrun had been suffering from a serious illness, and in May 2006, it was announced that Ivor Tiefenbrun had stepped aside as Linn's managing director, but would assume the role of Executive chairman. The business suffered considerably during his absence, and the bank put Linn on their "special measures" list in 2006 and a massive restructuring plan was ordered. His son Gilad was appointed managing director, and Ivor was brought back in an executive role.

=== Personal life ===
Tiefenbrun married Evelyn Stella Balarsky in 1969, and has three children – Natan (born 1970), who had 3 children - Ely (2002), Ava (2005) and Lyla (2008). His siblings are Gilad (1972) and Sara (1978). And while Gilad is Ivor's successor at Linn, Natan works for Cboe Europe, a global exchange operator. Sara moved to Australia in 2008 and runs The School of Life in Melbourne

Ivor revealed that he was suffering from Crohn's colitis, a debilitating autoimmune bowel disorder. His realisation that research into this condition was seriously underfunded led him to found Cure Crohn's Colitis, dubbed C^{3}.

He is founder member of the Entrepreneurial Exchange.

The outspoken Tiefenbrun, a long-time ardent supporter of Margaret Thatcher, was selected to contest the Glasgow Maryhill seat at the 2011 Scottish Parliament elections for the Scottish Conservative Party. He withdrew upon the uproar after it was reported in The Scotsman that he had said "you would have to be thick to accept that [Margaret Thatcher] was evil force" in Scotland.

== Recognition and awards ==
- MBE for his services to the Electronics Industry (1992)
- Invited to serve on the Design Council (1995–1999)
- Honorary Fellowship from the Glasgow School of Art (1999)
- Scottish Entrepreneur of the Year Award (2001)
- Visiting Professor of Mechanical Engineering, Strathclyde University (2004)
