= Monitor Audio =

British audio equipment manufacturer

- Type: Private
- Industry: Consumer electronics
- Founded: 1972; 54 years ago in Cambridge, England
- Founder: Mo Iqbal
- Headquarters: Rayleigh, Essex, England
- Area served: Worldwide
- Products: Hi-fi, loudspeakers, subwoofers, audiovisual
- Website: www.monitoraudio.com

Monitor Audio is a British company that specialises in designing and manufacturing loudspeakers and sound systems.

== History ==
The company was founded in 1972 by Mo Iqbal. Monitor Audio started life in a factory in Teversham near Cambridge, England. In 1976, Monitor Audio brought its manufacturing process in-house and moved to a factory in the heart of Essex. In 2000, it moved to a larger facility in nearby Rayleigh, where it remains. Monitor Audio made the manufacturing move to China in 2004. In November 2016, Monitor Audio acquired British Hi-Fi manufacturer Roksan. In April 2019, Monitor Audio acquired British Hi-Fi furniture manufacturer Blok. Monitor Audio Ltd is a British privately owned company. Robert Barford was appointed CEO in 2022.

== Technology ==
Since launch, Monitor Audio has operated with in-house design and technology teams.

Technologies brought to the market by Monitor Audio include:

- C-CAM Drivers: C-CAM stands for Ceramic-Coated Aluminium/Magnesium. Conventional speaker cones are liable to flex in operation, which can result in a significant level of audible distortion. Using a material originally developed by the aerospace industry, Monitor Audio created loudspeaker cones, which have a high resistance to bending stress, resulting in a smooth transition of audio frequencies.
- Damped Concentric Mode (DCM): Finite Element Analysis has been used to optimise the geometry where the driver cone and surround overlap with the intention of decreasing the amplitude and decay of the first concentric mode of the diaphragm, producing a more accurate time response from the speaker.
- DCF (Dynamic Coupling Filter): DCF replaces the customary rigid coupling of a driver and voice coil with a pliable unit. In doing so, DCF helps to dampen surplus energy produced by the driver, resulting in a more natural sound.
- Force-Cancelling Bass Drivers: Face two bass drivers in pairs and the reaction force of one will be the same as the other – equal and opposite. This means there is little, or no vibration force from the drivers, either within themselves or passed through into the cabinets. The result is a cabinet that is almost vibration free, with all the listener hearing is the sound; pure, clean and detailed.
- Gold Dome C-CAM: First introduced in the latter half of the 1980s, the Gold Dome Tweeter is built on its maker's 1985 metal dome tweeter technology. Monitor Audio anodises its ceramic-coated aluminium/magnesium alloy, creating a thinner, lighter more rigid dome, one which is extremely efficient and less prone to audio distortion.
- Hive II Port: This proprietary speaker port technology accelerates airflow and reduces turbulence, resulting in fast, powerful bass coupled with a superior transient response.
- HDT, C-CAM Cone: FEA-optimised surround and spider designs, plus increased voice coil length, the new Gold Series 6G’s 6- and 8-inch bass drivers exhibit greater linearity, reducing distortion for cleaner and punchier low end. Rigidly secured in place by a new cast aluminium, light-weight chassis design, it provides the optimum structure with maximum airflow around the drive unit.
- IDC: The Inverted Dual Concentric midrange/tweeter module offers up to 18 degrees of play, enabling in-ceiling and in-wall speakers to be discreetly positioned, yet still direct sound towards the listening zone.
- M-Array: The unique M-Array configuration features a single Micro Pleated Diaphragm III (MPD III) Transducer surrounded by no fewer than six, 2-inch Rigid Diaphragm Technology III (RDT III) dedicated midrange drivers to deliver sensational acoustic transparency alongside improved off-axis performance.
- MMP II: Metal Matrix Polymer driver cones have a polypropylene base loaded with metallic particles to offer a rigid and responsive structure. They are manufactured using a sophisticated high-pressure injection process, which modulates cone thickness at critical points to optimise stiffness and consistency, resulting in superior sonic performance.
- MPD III: The 3rd generation Micro Pleated Diaphragm (MPD III) high-frequency transducer redefines what is achievable for high-end home audio. Developed by Monitor Audio’s acoustic engineers when creating the company’s ground-breaking ‘Concept 50’ prototype, this breathtakingly accurate tweeter was unveiled for Monitor Audio’s 50th Anniversary celebrations.
- MPD: Developed over many months of intensive testing and listening, the MPD High-Frequency Transducer is a landmark achievement by the engineering team for Platinum II. It represents an imaginative re-working of existing technology, transforming a successful idea into an audiophile super-driver, having greater accuracy and efficiency than ever before. Using a new, proprietary low-mass pleated diaphragm with a surface area eight times larger than that of a traditional dome tweeter, the MPD transducer works like a super-fast accordion by rapidly squeezing the pleats to produce a smooth, wide, naturally fast response up to 100 kHz. As a result, it sounds more lifelike, releasing the high harmonic spectrum of every note without the distortion that blurs definition.
- MTM Driver Array: The MTM (Mid-Tweeter-Mid) Driver Array offers advantages of vertical symmetry. Also, increased bass-mid driver cone surface and voice coils mean improved dynamic capability and better in-room floor and ceiling interaction. Working like a point source, the sound dispersion is large, spacious and enveloping.
- Point Source Driver Array: The unique M-Array configuration features a single Micro Pleated Diaphragm III (MPD III) Transducer surrounded by no fewer than six, 2-inch Rigid Diaphragm Technology III (RDT III) dedicated midrange drivers. Hyphn’s point-source driver array is located squarely between the twin pillars, each of which houses a pair of powerful 8-inch (203mm) bass drivers.
- Radius Series 4G C-CAM Tweeter: A newly engineered, fully vented C-CAM Gold Dome Tweeter with external magnet architecture and an optimised UD Waveguide. The advanced design delivers smooth, open high frequencies with exceptionally low distortion and wide dispersion.
- RDT III: Super light, yet super strong, the Rigid Diaphragm Technology III (RDT III) cone works like a perfect piston. The ideal technology for elevating both midrange and bass performance, the drivers produce mid frequencies with dexterity, and bass is tight and articulate.
- RDT II: The second generation of Rigid Diaphragm Technology (RDT) bonds an ultra-thin composite structure to a honeycomb Nomex® core material. Using C-CAM for the front skin and woven carbon fibre for the rear, the RDTII structure reduces distortion by over 8 dB above 300 Hz, making RDTII the lowest distortion cone technology in Monitor Audio's history.
- RST: Rigid Surface Technology (RST), inspired by the Japanese art of Origami, strengthens the speaker cone, letting Monitor Audio speakers use thinner, lighted and more responsive C-CAM cones, meaning greater speed and accuracy, as well as greatly reduced distortion.
- RST II: Rigid Surface Technology (RST) II pattern has been evolved to give a more rigid profile with a new hexagonal dimpled structure, derived from Gold Series 5G’s RDT II development.
- RST III: The all-new RST III bass/mid drivers combine lightweight, rigid C-CAM cone technology with redesigned surrounds, improved venting and optimised motor systems.
- Silver Series 7G C-CAM Tweeter: The Silver Series 7G C-CAM tweeter features a completely new magnet structure, rear chamber design and surround, as well as taking our Uniform Dispersion Waveguide technology and further refining it
- Tri-Grip Dog Fixings: All current Monitor Audio custom install models use this fixing design. This three-position ‘dog’ style fix enables great contact surface area over other designs, whilst also saving installation time.
- Uniform Dispersion (UD) Waveguide: The curved profile of the waveguide has been optimised with the help of Finite Element Analysis in order to give benefits such as a controlled directivity pattern and increased radiation efficiency.
- Uniform Dispersion (UD) Waveguide II: Building on the UD Waveguide, this new development adds a compression ring above the surround and dome (Blue) increasing the tweeters sensitivity above 10 kHz. The increased sensitivity helps to flatten the frequency response whilst also reducing the distortion. Big and wide for the soundstages when position followed instructed by Monitor Audio.

== Products ==
- Monitor Audio Hyphn
- Monitor Audio Studio 89
- Monitor Audio Platinum Series 3G
- Monitor Audio Gold Series 6G
- Monitor Audio Silver Series 7G
- Monitor Audio Bronze 7G Series
- Monitor Audio Anthra Subwoofer Series
- Monitor Audio Vestra Subwoofer Series
- Monitor Audio Apex 1G Series
- Monitor Audio Radius Series 4G
- Monitor Audio Architectural Speakers & Electronics
- Monitor Audio Creator Series
- Monitor Audio Climate Series 3G
- Monitor Audio IMS-4 Streamer
- Monitor Audio IA40-3 Amplifier
- Monitor Audio Installation Amplifiers 2G

== See also ==
- List of loudspeaker manufacturers
