= Regas =

Regas is a surname. Notable persons with that name include:

- Dimitrios Regas (born 1986), Greek sprint athlete
- George Regas (1890–1940), Greek-American actor
- George F. Regas (1930–2021), American Episcopal priest
- Pedro Regas (1897–1974), Greek-American actor
- Rosa Regàs (born 1933), Catalan writer
