= Linn Sondek LP12 =

Prominent audiophile turntable from Scotland

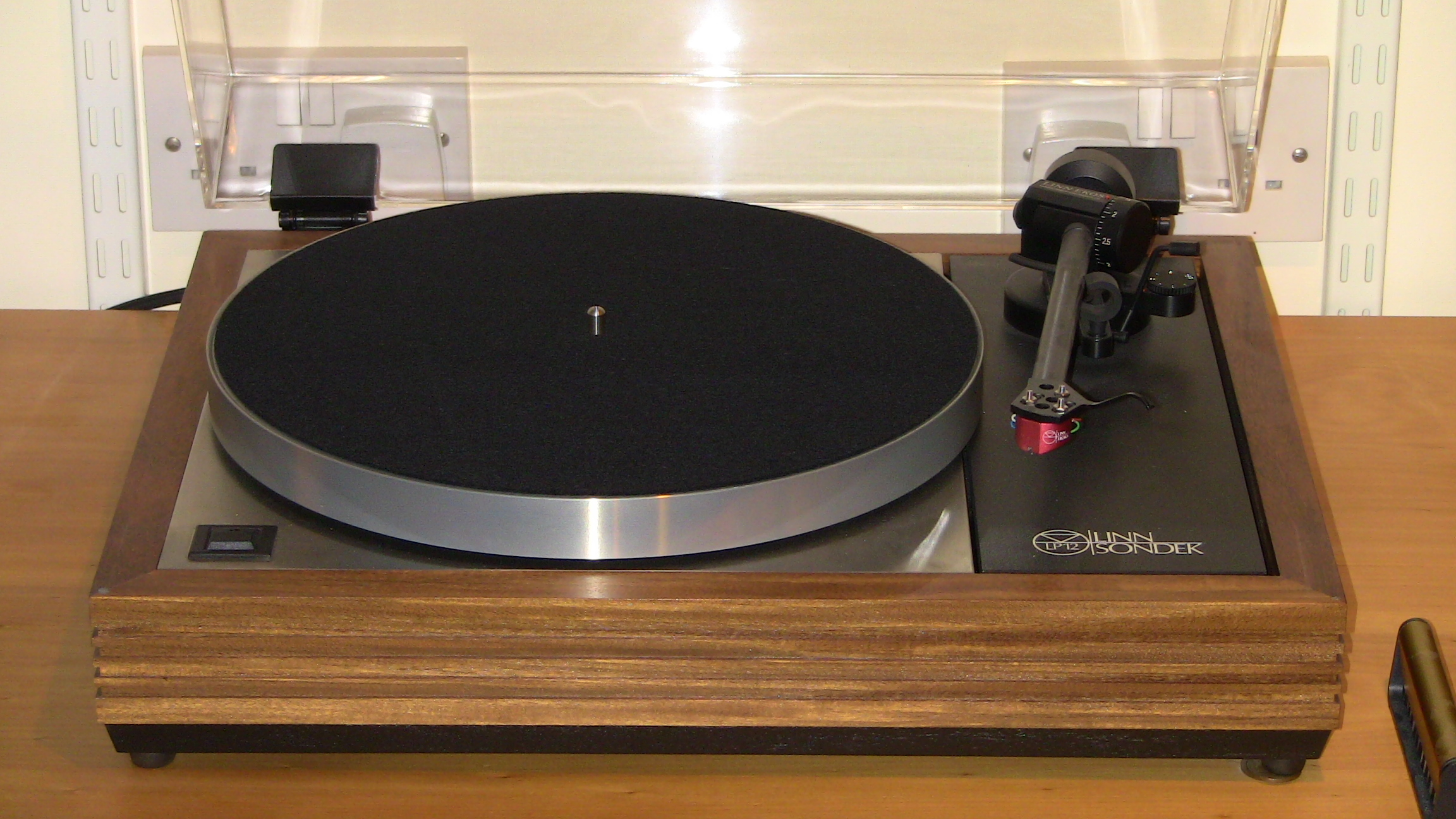
- Linn Sondek LP12 with Ekos arm and Troika cartridge
- Inception: 29 July 1972
- Manufacturer: Linn Products
- Website: Official product page

The Linn Sondek LP12 (often shortened to Sondek or LP12) is a transcription turntable produced by Glasgow-based Linn Products, manufacturer of hi-fi, home theatre, and multi-room audio systems. Its name is derived from the 12-inch vinyl LP (long play gramophone record).

Hi-Fi Choice reviewers voted the LP12 "the most important hi-fi component ever sold in the UK" and The Absolute Sound ranked it the second most significant turntable of all time in 2011. (Note: After the Acoustic Research XA.) Linn named their flagship CD player the Sondek CD12.

== History ==
The Sondek LP12 turntable, introduced in 1972, uses a suspended sub-chassis design and a patented tightly toleranced single-point bearing. The LP12 has evolved since its introduction, but its basic suspended sub-chassis design has remained. The design was identical to the Ariston RD11 and similar to the Thorens TD150, both in turn based on the Acoustic Research XA turntable that was launched in 1961. The XA was created by renowned audio pioneer Edgar Villchur.

The thinking at the time was that the most important component of a high-end audio system is the loudspeakers. Linn presented an important challenge to that by claiming that the source (i.e. the turntable) was the most important part of the system.

Ivor Tiefenbrun has talked about how Sondek derives from the term "sound deck" to emphasise the revolutionary concept that the turntable, the "deck", is responsible for the sound quality. Some report the original name was just Sondek without the LP12.

Linn didn't invent the turntable, we simply understood that there was more information on an LP record than people were capable of accessing, so we applied our understanding of engineering to extracting it.
Ivor Tiefenbrun, 2007

Early versions were a platform for mounting third-party tonearms, had a basic power supply arrangements, and would only revolve at 33 1/3 rpm. Those users requiring a 45 rpm option would have to purchase a special adaptor to increase the diameter of the motor pulley and platter speed accordingly.

Throughout the years, there have been many changes resulting from development efforts to improve this table. These changes include modifications to components such as the subplatter and bearing, rubber feet, baseboard, armboard, suspension springs and grommets and reinforced plinth. A much improved on-board PSU, the Valhalla, was marketed as an upgrade option. Later, external power supplies became de rigueur firstly with the introduction of the Linn Lingo, and later the Radikal.

The LP12 working with a Linn Ekos tonearm

== Partnered tonearms and power supplies ==
Like most turntable units, many options to partner the LP12 are available (including Linn's own) for tonearms, cartridges and, to a much lesser extent, power supplies. Although Linn constantly espouses the virtues of a "pure" Linn system, and there is much talked about synergies with other Linn components, the LP12 user has the option of a number of third party options. Before the existence of Linn-branded tonearms, Linn was the importer for Grace, and used their 707 tonearm. The Sumiko tonearm and later the Mission 774 arm were also popular choices and much spoken of. The first Linn-badged arm, the Ittok LVII, was in production 1979–93. A 3-point-mounted arm with a large-bore arm tube designed and manufactured in Japan. It was gradually superseded by the Ekos ("Ecosse"). A budget arm, the Basik LVX, was produced from 1983 to 1986, and replaced by the Akito. For today's demanding audiophile, LP12 is commonly partnered with the Linn Ekos SE tonearm; the unipivot ARO tonearm from Naim Audio is also very popular.

External power options include Linn's own top-of-the-line Radikal power supply featuring an auto-calibrating speed management system; Naim Audio manufactures the Armageddon power supply for the LP12, based on its own Hi-Cap power supply unit.

Linn were distributors for Grace and Supex Corporation at the time, and thus the Grace G-707 tone arm and Supex SD900 and SD1000 phono cartridges were also frequently partners for the deck. Early Linn-branded cartridges, such as the Asak and Asaka, and the three-point mounted Troika (now discontinued, and replaced by the Krystal, which is built by Goldring), were produced by Supex for Linn. Linn's later subcontracted cartridge manufacture to Lyra Corporation in Japan. Paul Messenger, writing in Stereophile, credits Linn's endorsement and importation of the Supex brand for the resurgence of audiophile interest in moving coil cartridges.

Naim Audio manufactured the Linn-branded head amplifier (phono amplifier), the Linnk. Linn today manufacturers the Uphorik ("euphoric"), and Urika ("eureka") phono pre-amplifier that can be powered by the Radikal. Urika II connects the LP 12 with Linn's proprietary digital Exakt technology, and handles most of the RIAA compensation and amplification in the digital domain.

Linn capitalised on the success of the Sondek LP12 by introducing the more affordable Basik and Axis turntables, complementary tonearms for the Sondek and cartridges at different price points.

== Popularity ==
The LP12 is popular with many audiophiles around the world for its excellent ability to play music with "pace, rhythm and timing". It is sometimes used by hi-fi reviewers as a reference turntable.

It's impossible to imagine the high-end industry without the LP12".

— Robert Harley

It was at its most popular in the golden age of vinyl playback, principally the 1970s through to the 1980s. David Thompson, writing in Record Collector News, said that the LP12 enjoyed a "stranglehold on the qualities of LP reproduction for many years". Its closest competitors were probably the Roksan Xerxes, the Well Tempered Table, several Thorens decks (TD125/126, TD160, TD2001/3001). the Michell GyroDec, the Dunlop Systemdek, the Logic DM-101 and the Pink Triangle PT1. However, the LP12 outsold them all in the United Kingdom. In fact, TNT asserts that "most foreign manufacturers of hi-end turntables didn't even bother to import" because they were faced with an uphill fight. Critics and reviewers would all too frequently conclude of any imported competitor that "an LP12 is better and you could buy two Linn's [sic] for that money".

The LP12 has acquired such cult status amongst audiophile turntables that many seek to knock it off its pedestal. Although the design has not been fundamentally revisited, there have been improvements to the turntable's design since its launch using advances in material science, over 40 years ago. It remains possible to buy a Sondek LP12 in a configuration not dissimilar to one made in 1973. In 2004, Stereophile said it was "a classic, a revolutionary, an iconoclast, a survivor." In 2011, ranking the LP12 the second "Most Significant Turntables of All Time" for The Absolute Sound, Robert Harley said: "It’s impossible to imagine the high-end industry without the LP12".

== Product history ==
Changes thereto are elaborated below. related serial numbers in square brackets

- 1972, LP12 turntable introduced.
- 1974, Main bearing liner changed. Sub-chassis strengthened by addition of strap, spot welded in place. Motor control circuit changed from terminal strip to small PCB. Mains switch changed from two buttons to single with mains neon. [s/n 2,000]
- 1978, Top plate modified adding two holes for 6 x 0.5 self tappers into wood block. [23,000]
- 1979, Lid prop removed, hinges changed to spring loading. [27,000]
- 1981, February. Nirvana mechanical components. [32,826]
- 1982, May. Valhalla crystal-driven electronic power supply made standard. [38,794]
- 1984, New clear lid. [~52,600]
- 1984, Enlarged plinth corner bracing. [53,000]
- 1984, June. Sub-chassis strengthening bar epoxy glued instead of spot welded. [54,101]
- 1985, August. Cap head screws on bearing housing. [60,383]
- 1985, September. Diode modification to Valhalla board [61,090]
- 1985, December. Strengthening blocks on corners of plinth.
- 1986, Suspension springs improved.
- 1987, March. New bearing housing, New Formica and MDF armboard. [69,161]
- 1987, April. New springs. [69,591]
- 1987, Bearing improved with better lining material and tighter tolerances. Change to black oil. Suspension springs ground to improved tolerance. Arm board composition improved. [70,000]
- 1989, Motor thrust pad changed. Valhalla surge guard modification. PCB mains lead (UK). [79,700]
- 1989, New MDF armboard, laminated top and bottom. [79,160]
- 1989, Harder suspension grommets fitted. [81,000]
- 1990, External Lingo power supply available as add-on.
- 1991, motor thrust pad cap added to Lingo models. [87,047]
- 1991, Valhalla board prototype with 45 rpm (never went into production, codename "Wakonda") [87,047]
- 1991, motor thrust pad cap added to Valhalla models. [87,206]
- 1991, Introduction of LP12 Basik, a stripped-down version of the turntable [87,672]
- 1991, Solid base board replaces hardboard. [87,672]
- 1991, Trampolin base board with isolating feet available as an option [87,672].
- 1992, Improved top plate fixing. [88,950]
- 1993, Cirkus upgrade (larger and better machined inner platter and new bearing, new springs, armboard, belt) fitted as standard. [90,582]
- 1997, a limited edition commemorative LP12 was created to mark the 25th anniversary of the LP12. Amongst other features, it bears a plaque etched with the signature of Linn's founder Ivor Tiefenbrun.
- 2001, New motor used (first new motor since original 1972).
- 2002, Maple plinth introduced adding to existing black, walnut, rosewood and afromosia options.
- 2013, Full-spec limited-edition (40 in all) 40th anniversary LP12, plinth made from oak casks from Highland Park distillery, priced at £25,000.
- 2018, Lingo 4 power supply introduced with dual-speed AC motor.
- 2020, March. Karousel single-point bearing introduced and Cirkus bearing discontinued. Custom painted plinth option now available with all new LP12 turntables.

== Important upgrades ==
(in chronological order)

Lingo Power Supply (Introduced: 1990) Linn describes the LINGO as a "high precision, direct coupled, power supply designed to sit alongside the LP12 turntable". Prior to the Lingo, speed accuracy for 33 rpm (and 45 rpm) rotation was determined by the Valhalla power supply board.

The Lingo generates two 50 Hz sinusoidal waveforms which it amplifies and sends to the turntable motor – the Valhalla generates a single sine wave. Using crystal oscillators, one for 33 1/3 rpm and one for 45 rpm, the two speeds are made possible. When depressed, the switch on the turntable supplies the start-up torque with which the deck's desired rotation speed is achieved. It also allows selection of the appropriate oscillator, the output of which is fed into a synchronous counter to produce a 50 Hz or 67.5 Hz square wave for 33 1/3 rpm and 45 rpm respectively. The square wave is filtered into a clean sine wave to minimise motor vibration, and amplified to 120 V to feed the turntable.

The Cirkus upgrade (Introduced: 1993) The Cirkus kit aims to provide the LP12 with greater stability and ensure the bearing sits perfectly true to the chassis, through a redesigned bearing and stronger sub-chassis assembly.

The bearing housing height has been increased to improve lubrication; its mounting flange thickness has been substantially increased; the geometry of the top and bottom liners in the bearing housing has been altered to further reduce incidence of rocking. Thickness of the sub-chassis was doubled to improve rigidity, reduce flexing and improve control of the relationship between turntable platter and arm. With the new bearing comes a new sub-platter.

Keel (Introduced: 2006) The Keel upgrade to the LP12 is a replacement subchassis, machined from solid aluminium. It builds on the Cirkus upgrade (now fitted as standard to new LP12s) but is not included as standard in 'regular' production LP12s. Linn claims that the Keel is an application of its "close-tolerance aluminium machining", first seen in the ingot casing of the Sondek CD12 CD player. The Keel, along with the Ekos SE tonearm and Trampolin Mk.2 were three Special Edition upgrades for the turntable's 33⅓ birthday, 33⅓ being the standard rotational speed when playing LPs. Keel offers integrated armboard and tonearm collar and with its varying 'pocket' depths for consistent centre of gravity. Keel upgrade is available for Ekos SE & Ekos tonearms only. Although Keel upgrade is possible for Akito tonearm but not recommended due to collar limitation.

Trampolin Mark 2 (Introduced: 2006) The original Trampolin baseboard was made from MDF, rather than masonite, incorporating damping feet which were optimised for LP12 to be placed on heavy furniture. The Trampolin II is made from aluminium.

Radikal (Introduced: 2009) The 'Radikal' system, priced at £2,500, comprises a "control box", DC motor and power supply which, according to Linn, offers more accurate speed control, and reduced vibration and resonance. This is achieved by using on-board speed management system with automatic calibration, and use of a new motor with low magnetic field and electrical noise, located within a machined housing. It can be used to power the Urika phono amplifier or the Linn phonostage mounted inside the turntable.

Karousel (Introduced: 2020) The Karousel is a new single point bearing which replaces the Cirkus bearing in all new LP12 turntables. Karousel is also retrofittable to any existing LP12 as an upgrade. According to Linn: 'The substantial lock-nut fastening on the stainless steel housing increases rigidity at the critical point where bearing and sub-chassis come together.' Karousel has been reported by forum users to bring a big improvement to the sound quality of the LP12. The upgrade kit for existing LP12 is supplied with an inner platter, new springs, grommets and lock nuts.

== Recognition ==
- Named No. 1 of 'The Hot 100 Products, 2002' by Stereophile.
- Named '2004 Analogue source component of the year' by Stereophile.
- In May 2006, Hi-Fi Choice reviewers voted the LP12 "the most important hi-fi components ever sold in the UK".
- Named '2007 Analogue source component of the year' by Stereophile.
- In 2011, The Absolute Sound named the LP12 No. 2 in its ranking of "Most Significant Turntables of All Time"
