= Helical armature =

A helical armature is a form of air-gap electric motor or generator armature wound in a helical fashion as opposed to a conventional random or orthocyclic winding. Such a design is of interest in superconducting motor and generation technology, though comparatively little research has been done on the subject. An important and remarkable feature of helical armature windings is that they have no end windings. Moreover, as each conductor follows a helical path of constant pitch, helical windings are not easily divided into active and end regions. An important downside, though, is that such armatures provide poor winding factors.

An illustration of a helically wound armature.

== Use in motors ==
Motors of helical armature design have a lower winding resistance, allowing the motor to run more efficiently, and giving it a longer lifespan. Helical windings also provide low inertia and smooth torque for low-speed DC motors. A disadvantage is that they have relatively low winding ratios.

== Use in generators ==
An advantage of helical armature windings in superconducting generators is that they have higher VA ratings, lower armature resistance, and lower synchronous reactance. Future superconducting generators would benefit from a helical winding because due to the absence of active and end zone it can be supported uniformly, unlike a conventional winding. There is a <10% loss in motor flux though, but this would be compensated for by the various advantages in this design.

== See also ==
- Coil winding technology
