= American Journal of Audiology =

- Discipline: Audiology
- Language: English
- Edited by: Erin M. Picou

Publication details
- History: 1991–present
- Publisher: American Speech-Language-Hearing Association (United States)
- Frequency: Quarterly
- Impact factor: 1.4 (2023)

Standard abbreviations
- ISO 4: Am. J. Audiol.

Indexing
- ISSN: 1059-0889 (print); 1558-9137 (web)
- OCLC no.: 24477823

Links
- Journal homepage; Online access; Online archive

The American Journal of Audiology is a peer-reviewed medical journal published biannually by the American Speech–Language–Hearing Association. It publishes articles related to clinical practice in audiology, including various clinical techniques, professional issues, and administration.

According to the Journal Citation Reports, the journal has a 2023 impact factor of 1.4.
