= Rega Research =

British audio equipment manufacturer

Rega Research Ltd.
- Company type: Private
- Industry: Consumer Electronics
- Founded: 1973
- Headquarters: Essex, England
- Key people: Roy Gandy, Phil Freeman, Terry Bateman
- Products: Hi-fi equipment, turntables
- Website: http://www.rega.co.uk

Rega Research Ltd. is a British audio equipment manufacturer. Rega was founded in 1973. The company's name was formed of the initials of its two founders (RElph & GAndy). Rega are widely known for their turntables – most notably the iconic Rega Planar 3, cartridges and tonearms, and has produced award-winning amplification and speakers for over 20 years. In addition to manufacturing products under their own brand name, they have also served as an original equipment manufacturer of turntables and tonearms for other companies such as NAD and Rotel.

== History ==
The Rega RP3 record player

In addition to making its own brand products, Rega is an OEM supplier. For example, Rega arms or variants are found in numerous other audiophile turntables. It also manufactured a slightly modified version of its Planar 2 with a RB250 arm for NAD that was marketed under the NAD533 model number.

In 2014, Rega maintains a custom-built factory and has over 140 employees. It has no marketing department, but produces every model in the UK, and tries to maintain UK-based parts suppliers as well. Rega has advertised once, stating that it does not advertise as it prefers to invest the money saved in research and product development. The Rega factory is located in Southend-on-Sea, Essex.

== Products ==
- Turntables (and related components)
- CD players
- Amplifiers
- Loudspeakers
- List of phonograph manufacturers
