= Linn Products =

Engineering company, manufacturer of hi-fi equipment

Linn Products Limited
- Type: Private limited company
- Industry: Audiovisual equipment manufacturing and distribution
- Founded: 19 February 1973; 53 years ago
- Headquarters: Waterfoot, East Renfrewshire, Scotland, United Kingdom
- Key people: Ivor Tiefenbrun; Gilad Tiefenbrun
- Products: High fidelity equipment Audiovisual equipment
- Number of employees: 160
- Subsidiaries: Linn Records
- Website: linn.co.uk

Linn Products is an engineering company that manufactures hi-fi and audio equipment. Founded by Ivor Tiefenbrun in Glasgow, Scotland, in 1972, the company is best known as the manufacturer of the Linn Sondek LP12 turntable.

From 2007 Linn was one of the first audio manufacturers to introduce digital music streaming using the home network and Internet. This has become the focus of the company's strategy leading to audio systems to support digital music playback of 24bit/192 kHz studio master quality recordings using a digital stream over a home network.

Linn Records was the first to sell DRM-free 24-bit studio master quality tracks downloaded over the internet.

This network approach was extended in 2013 with the introduction of the Linn Exakt technology to retain the 24-bit lossless signal in the digital domain to the active crossover.

In late 2014 Linn announced the integration of TIDAL's lossless music streaming service into Linn DS digital players enabling access to over 25 million audio tracks at CD-quality over the Internet.

Originally based in the Castlemilk suburb of south Glasgow (opposite Linn Park), it is now based just outside the city, between Waterfoot and Eaglesham, East Renfrewshire. The factory is the only building in Scotland designed by the architect Richard Rogers.

== Company history ==
=== Origins ===
Linn was founded by Ivor Tiefenbrun to produce the Sondek LP12 turntable. The company's logo is the simple geometric representation of the 'single point' bearing which was the unique selling point of the LP12 turntable.

Hamish Robertson designed the Ariston RD11 in 1971 with Castle Precision Engineering Ltd machining many of the parts. Robertson left Ariston, which had been taken over by Dunlop Westayr Ltd and reorganised as Ariston Audio Ltd. In February 1973 Linn Products Ltd. was formed to sell turntables made by Castle Precision Engineering. This was officially announced in an advertisement in Hi-Fi News & Record Review, with the following text: "The turntable previously available under the name Ariston RD11 is now available under the name Linn LP12." There were claims, and even patent litigation at the time, that the first Linn Sondek LP12 was a carbon copy of the RD11, and many parts interchangeable. Ultimately, the patent was awarded successfully to Linn.

The company's philosophy is as controversial as its founder, who is known for his believing in only two ways of doing things – the Linn way and the wrong way. Whilst many in the industry speak of them in strictly reverential terms, notable critic Ken Kessler accuses the company (with a touch of hyperbole) of being doctrinaire, prone to "propaganda, brainwashing, historical revisionism and other ways of interpreting reality". As such, and because Linn supposedly design their products within the context of an all-Linn system, they try to ensure that all the variables are covered in a "proper demonstration".

=== Sondek LP12 ===
The LP12 working with a Linn Ekos tonearm

The Sondek LP12 is a suspended sub-chassis turntable with a single-point platter bearing. From its introduction in 1973, there have not been any radical changes to the turntable design, which remains in production. However, the LP12's sound quality has been improved through retrofittable upgrade kits. The successive upgrades consist mostly of refinements in materials used and improved manufacturing tolerances.

In 2011, some thirty years after the birth of the compact disc, sales of the LP12 and accessories still accounted for 10 percent of the company's turnover.

Initially Linn manufactured the LP12 itself, but not any other components such as tonearms and cartridges. This gap was filled with a largely complementary range from, amongst others, Supex cartridges, Grace and Sumiko tonearms, and Naim Audio amplification.

=== 1975 Speaker ===
In 1975, Linn patented its isobaric loading principle, and launched the Linn Isobarik loudspeaker.

=== 1993 Digital compact disc ===
Linn's first CD player, the Karik, was released in 1993 – 11 years after the CD format itself.

The Sondek CD12, pioneered by Alan Clark, was launched in 1997. In 2005 it was discontinued when Philips ended production of the laser around which the player was designed.

On 20 November 2009, Linn said it would stop making CD players to focus on digital streaming products instead.

=== 2006 crisis ===
In May 2006, Linn announced that founder Ivor Tiefenbrun would relinquish the position of Linn's managing director in favour of finance director and company secretary Peter Murphy, an 8-year veteran of the firm. As part of his succession planning, Tiefenbrun had appointed him to the Linn board in November 2004 as "the obvious successor in the short term", along with his elder son Natan. Ivor's other son, Gilad, had already joined the company in 2002 and had, perhaps contentiously, quickly risen to become head of R&D. At around that time, Tiefenbrun executed a share swap with his brother Marcus in exchange for his shares in Castle Precision Engineering, consolidating his stake in Linn to 60%. Marcus was to remain a non-executive director. Ivor Tiefenbrun had given up executive duties after being diagnosed with a serious illness.

The company faced its most significant crisis since its founding when it plunged into the red in 2006, due to escalating costs and weighed down by up to £6.8 million in short term debt. The distribution deal with Loewe television and the partnership to supply Aston Martin with in car entertainment (ICE) systems were terminated. The company's turnover declined by £15.5 million. Lloyds TSB, the company's bank, put Linn on its "special measures" list, and installed a troubleshooter on the board to redress and restructure the business.

In 2007, the bank ordered asset disposals; all properties except the headquarters was earmarked for sale. Linn shed two-thirds of its staff, including then managing director Peter Murphy and some senior managers. At some point (after March 2007) Linn closed the original factory that was next door to Castle Precision Engineering (run by Ivor's brother) on Drakemire Drive. Thus the metalworking and training facility were moved into the Eaglesham facility.

=== 2007 – DS (digital streaming) becomes new company strategy ===
Linn was one of the first audio manufacturers to understand the likely impact of the internet and the future importance of the network, which became the focus of the company's new strategy under its DS - Digital Streaming – product development plan. The first product to be introduced under the new strategy was the Klimax DS network music player, Linn's first product to support the playback of 24bit/192 kHz studio master quality recordings from a digital stream over a home network. The Linn Records website – www.linnrecords.com - was the first site to sell DRM-free 24-bit Studio Master quality tracks, downloaded over the internet. The pioneering availability of Studio Master 24bit/192 kHz and introduction of the first Linn DS network music player combined to set the company's path for the future.

Ivor's son Gilad was promoted from Head of Engineering to managing director in April 2008 and Ivor was brought back with executive responsibilities. In February 2009, Gilad Tiefenbrun was officially named Managing Director of the company. Ivor remains Executive Chairman.

=== 2010 – DS-I & Label of the year ===
The Majik DS-I was launched as the first Linn DS player to integrate a pre-amplifier allowing connected sources to be streamed onto a network and received by any other Linn DS player located throughout the home. As a result, Linn retired the dedicated Knekt multi-room system. In October Linn Records was awarded Label of the Year by Gramophone magazine- referencing the company's ongoing commitment to improving the quality of the recording process and distributing music online at studio master quality.

=== 2012 - Kiko System ===
Linn launched its first compact lifestyle system called Kiko. Available in five colours but only as a complete system comprising a DSM and dedicated active speakers. Critical reaction confirmed that the combination offered the performance of much larger systems. Kiko was awarded Best Music System £1500+ in both 2012 and 2013 by What Hi-Fi? magazine.

=== 2013 - 40th anniversary ===
Linn celebrated its 40th anniversary with a limited edition Sondek LP12 launched in partnership with specialist whisky distiller Highland Park. The 40th Anniversary LP12 was produced as limited run of 40 individually numbered units featuring Linn's highest Sondek specification and including a plinth sourced from 100-year-old Highland Park whisky barrels. The anniversary Sondeks were also supplied with a dual branded bottle of 40-year-old Highland Park single malt whisky.

=== 2013 - Exakt - the source is in the speaker ===
Exakt technology has been described by the company as its most important development since the introduction of the original Sondek turntable. Exakt was designed to eliminate many of the sources of loss inherent in the traditional analogue hi-fi chain by keeping the 24-bit lossless signal in the digital domain all the way to the loudspeaker; and converting to analogue at the latest possible stage.

Exakt effectively turns the speaker into an intelligent, network connected, software upgradeable product. Inside each Exakt loudspeaker is a proprietary digital platform - called the Exakt engine by Linn - that allows the company to claim such performance-enhancing capabilities as the complete elimination of phase and magnitude distortion plus the ability to also offer room optimisation.

Exakt was initially launched as a Klimax (top) level system to the highest critical acclaim.

In 2015 the room optimisation capabilities of Exakt were released as a free software upgrade to all non-Exakt products under the name Space Optimisation.

=== 2014 Exakt range extended ===
The Exakt range was extended to include two new systems: Exakt Akubarik and the first stand mount speaker version, Exakt Akudorik which also received the highest critical acclaim.

=== 2014 TIDAL Integration with Linn DS players ===
In late 2014 Linn announced the availability of lossless music streaming service (TIDAL) on Linn DS digital players to provide access to a CD-quality library of over 25 million audio tracks using the Internet.

=== 2008 - 2014 - The return to sustained profitability and growth ===
In November 2014 Linn announced its sixth continuous year of profitability with revenue also continuing to grow in five of the previous six years. The company had continued to allocate a significant percentage of its turnover to R&D throughout the previous eight years with the focus on the DS strategy of studio master quality audio delivered over the network, extended more latterly with the development of Exakt technology. All have combined to have a positive impact on turnover and profitability

== Partnerships ==
During much of the 1970s and 1980s, Linn adopted a tight working relationship with Naim Audio. It all started in about 1974 when Linn was looking for suitable amplifiers to drive their Isobarik loudspeaker and came across Vereker's NAP 200. Their product ranges were complementary, and their names were often mentioned together. Linn focused on the electromechanical parts while Naim worked exclusively on the electronics. During this time, the Linn/Naim system was a preferred combination for many audiophiles. The two companies advocated a 'source-first' philosophy based on the same principle as garbage in, garbage out – that an amplifier that correctly performed its role would only faithfully amplify a signal, but that all things being equal, a superior source component would allow the recorded music to better connect with the listener on an emotive level. It followed that a superior source signal paired with lesser amplification would sound better than an inferior source through high-quality amplification and speakers. This flew in the face of conventional wisdom that had been made prevalent by Edgar Villchur. In line with the philosophy of the comparative demonstration, the companies' dealers eschewed multi-speaker demonstrations with switched comparators to "single-speaker dem rooms". The two companies had almost the same sales and marketing strategy, and shared many of the same retailers/dealers. Since many of the principles the two companies subscribed to were thought to be heretical, or flying in the face of conventional wisdom, Linn/Naim aficionados were nicknamed "flat Earthers" sometimes affectionately, sometimes derogatorily. The two companies diverged during the 1980s, at the dawn of digital audio.

In 2002 Linn formed a brand partnership to supply audio systems to Aston Martin cars. Linn supplied amplification and loudspeaker systems for the Vanquish and DB9 models but three years later was replaced by Alpine Electronics, the previous supplier.

== Awards and recognition ==
- Ivor Tiefenbrun was awarded the MBE by HM Queen Elizabeth II in for "his and his company's engineering achievements and outstanding service to the electronics industry."
- As of 1 January 2002, Linn Products Ltd has been awarded The Royal Warrant of Appointment as a Tradesman to His Royal Highness, Charles, Prince of Wales, as a provider of Entertainment Systems.
- Linn was awarded the Queen's Award for Enterprise in Innovation in 2012.

== Products and trademarks ==
Linn have a number of trademarks for their products, many of which have the characteristic "k" in place of a hard "c". Ivor Tiefenbrun has stated that the name of the “Sondek” turntable, the company’s first product, is a contraction of 'sound deck', emphasising the (at the time) revolutionary concept that the turntable, the “deck”, was primarily responsible for sound quality, with each following component successively less important. The use of the single “k” in their product naming stuck, as it gave them a slightly mystical touch. Several of the names have Scottish origins, e.g. Kairn, Keltik, Ekos, Keilidh (cairn, Celtic, Ecosse, Ceilidh), some have relevance to the function they perform e.g. Knekt (a system to connect many rooms together) or Klout (a powerful amplifier), more recently some names are derived from descriptives of quality (Exakt, Klimax, Akurate, Dynamik, Kandid). Some products have had relatively simple names, such as the Index loudspeaker.

=== Integrated products ===
- Streamers: Selekt DSM, Majik DSM, Majik DS-I, Sneaky DSM, Sneaky DS, Kiko DSM
- Disc players: Classik Movie, Classik Music, Classik
- Amplifier: Intek, Majik-I

=== Multistage products ===
- Streamer/preamp/digital-crossover: Klimax Exakt DSM
- Streamer/preamp: Klimax DSM, Akurate DSM
- DVD/CD/AVprocessor: Unidisk SC

=== Sources ===
- Digital Streamers: Klimax DS, Akurate DS, Majik DS, Kivor
- CD: Sondek CD12, Akurate CD, Majik CD, Ikemi, Genki, Karik, Numerik (DAC), Mimik
- DVD/CD: Unidisk 1.1/2.1
- Tuners: Kremlin, Pekin, Akurate, Kudos
- Turntables: LP12, Axis, Basik

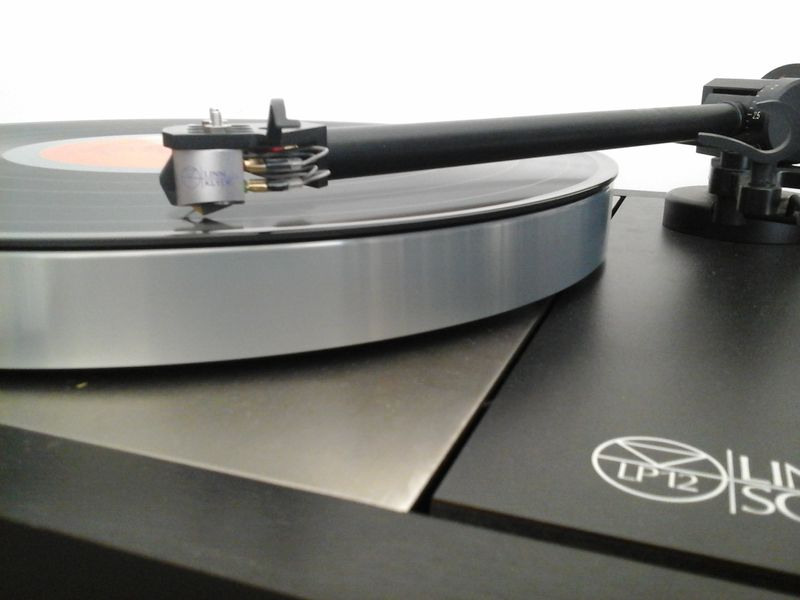
The LP12 working with a Linn Ekos tonearm and Linn Klyde cartridge

==== Sondek LP12 ====
- Power supplies: Radikal (Klimax enclosure), Radikal (Akurate enclosure), Lingo 4/3/2/1, Majik, Valhalla, Basik
- Arm: Ekos SE/1, Ekos SE, Ekos 2/1, Ittok LVII, Ittok LVIII, Akito, Basik Plus, Basik
- Cartridges:
- MC: Kandid, Akiva, Arkiv IV, Arkiv A/B, Troïka, Krystal, Klyde, Karma, Asaka, Asak, Metek, Trak
- MM: Adikt/1 Adikt, Basik, K18 mk1/2, K9, K5
- Phonostages: Urika II, Urika, Uphorik, Linto

=== Control/Preamps ===
- Integrated: Majik, Intek
- Two channel: Klimax Kontrol, Akurate Kontrol, Majik Kontrol, Kairn (Pro), Kollector, Wakonda, Pretek, LK1
- Multi channel: Kisto, Kinos, Exotik, AV5103

=== Power Amplifiers ===
- Klimax Solo, Klimax Chakra Twin, Akurate [234]200, Majik [2345]100, 2250, Klout, AV5125, AV5105, LK240 (single channel), LK140, LK85, LK100, LK2 -> LK 2-75 -> LK 280, Powertek

=== Exakt Digital Crossovers ===
- Klimax Exaktbox
- Akurate Exaktbox
- Akurate Exaktbox-I
- Majik Exaktbox-I
- Aktiv cards: Stereo, Mono (depending on amp or Exaktbox)

=== Speakers ===
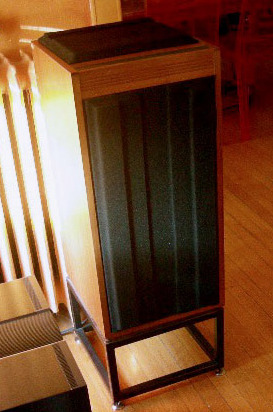
The Linn Isobarik DMS (with in-built crossover) in a domestic setting

- Floorstanding: Klimax Exakt 350A, Klimax 350[AP], Artikulat 350, Akubarik, Akurate 242, 530, 520, Komri, Keltik, Majik 140, Majik Isobarik, Isobarik, Espek, AV5140, Komponent 110, Kaber, Ninka, Keilidh, Nexus
- Bookshelf: Klimax 320[AP], Akudorik, Artikulat 320[AP], Akurate 212, Majik 109, AV5110 (also called Unik), Komponent 104, Sara 9, Sara, Tukan, Katan, Kan, Index, Helix
- Centre: Klimax 340, Artikulat 340[AP], Akurate 225, Majik 112, Komponent 106, Ekwal, AV5120, Trikan, Centrik
- Sub: Klimax 345, Akurate 221, Majik 126, Melodik, AV5150, Komponent 120, Sizmik, Afekt
- In-wall: Sekrit IW10, Custom 2K (106C, 104C), Sekrit LS6000, Diskreet, Sweetspot

=== Cables ===
- Interconnect: T-Kable, silver, black
- Speaker: K200, K600, K400, K40, K20, K10

== See also ==
- List of phonograph manufacturers
- The Linn Rekursiv computer processor
