= Edgar Villchur =

American inventor (1917-2011)

- Born: Edgar Marion Villchur; May 28, 1917; New York, New York, U.S.
- Died: October 17, 2011 (aged 94); Woodstock, New York, U.S.

Edgar Marion Villchur (28 May 1917 – 17 October 2011) was an American inventor, educator, and writer widely known for his 1954 invention of the acoustic suspension loudspeaker which revolutionized the field of high-fidelity equipment. A speaker Villchur developed, the AR-3, is exhibited at The Smithsonian Institution's Information Age Exhibit in Washington, DC.

Villchur's speaker systems provided improved bass response while reducing the speaker's cabinet size. Acoustic Research, Inc. (AR), of which he was president from 1954 to 1967, manufactured high-fidelity loudspeakers, turntables, and other stereo components of his design, and demonstrated their quality through "live vs. recorded" concerts. The company's market share grew to 32 percent by 1966. After leaving AR, Villchur researched hearing aid technology, developing the multichannel compression hearing aid, which became the industry standard for hearing aids.

== Background ==
Villchur received his bachelor's and master's degrees in art history from City College in New York City. He worked in the theater, and had plans to be a scenic designer. During World War II he was trained by the US Army in maintenance and repair of radios, radar, and other equipment. He was stationed in New Guinea, where he rose to the rank of captain and was in charge of the electronic equipment for his squadron.

After the war, Villchur opened a shop in New York's Greenwich Village where he repaired radios and built custom home high fidelity sets. He continued to educate himself in the area of audio engineering, taking courses in mathematics and engineering at New York University. After submitting an article to Audio Engineering magazine (later renamed Audio), he was asked to write a regular column.

Despite having a master's degree was in Art History, Villchur applied for a teaching job at NYU in the mid-fifties, presenting the administration with an outline of a course he titled Reproduction of Sound. His proposal was accepted, and he taught that course at night for several years. At the same time, he worked at the American Foundation for the Blind in Manhattan, organizing their laboratory and designing or redesigning devices to make it easier for blind people to live independently. The tone arm on the turntable made by the Foundation had 12% distortion. Villchur redesigned it so that the distortion was less than 4%.

One of his inventions for the Foundation for the Blind was a turntable tone arm that descended slowly to the surface of a vinyl record. This prevented the possibility that a blind person might drop the arm accidentally and that the sudden fall might damage the stylus or the record. In later years, when he was designing the AR turntable, he added this same feature to the tone arm. In the ads describing the advantages of the product, the photo showed a person accidentally dropping the tone arm, with a caption noting that this turntable was "For butterfingers."

== Acoustic-suspension loudspeaker ==
Villchur recognized that the weak link in home equipment was the loudspeaker. Amplifiers, record players, tape players, and tuners were fairly faithful to the original sound, but speakers of the time were unable to reproduce the bass notes of records or tapes without distortion. He came up with the idea for a new form of audio loudspeaker, one that would greatly reduce distortion by replacing the nonlinear mechanical spring with a linear air cushion. This "acoustic suspension" design demonstrated a greater undistorted SPL (sound pressure level) at 25 Hz than any previous loudspeaker type, including bass reflex, infinite baffle, or large horn designs. Villchur's new and sophisticated understanding of the inexorable relationship among low-frequency extension, efficiency, and cabinet volume was later termed, by Henry Kloss, "Hofmann's Iron Law".

Villchur built a prototype of his new speaker out of a plywood box. The dimensions of the face of the box were taken from a picture frame that Villchur had hanging in his house. His wife, Rosemary, who had been a draftswoman during the war, sewed the pattern for the flexible surround out of mattress ticking. Unable to afford the full services of a patent attorney, he found a patent lawyer who was willing to explain the patent process briefly, and Villchur applied for a patent himself. In 1956, he received U.S. patent 2,775,309 for the acoustic-suspension loudspeaker. He tried to sell the idea to several loudspeaker manufacturers, but his idea was rejected as impossible.

== Acoustic Research, Inc. ==
One of his students at NYU, Henry Kloss, listened to Villchur's explanation of acoustic suspension and agreed that a speaker built on this principle would be a major improvement in hi-fi sound reproduction. Villchur decided that since the established manufacturers were not interested in the invention, the only way to make it available to the public was to go into business producing the new speaker. Kloss had a loft in Cambridge, Massachusetts where he was making loudspeaker cabinets, and the two men became business partners in Acoustic Research, Inc. (AR) in 1954. The partnership lasted until 1957, when Kloss left to form KLH, manufacturing loudspeakers using Villchur's acoustic suspension principle, under license from AR.

Over the next two decades, almost all major loudspeaker manufacturers gradually changed from mechanical to acoustic suspension. At first they did so under license to AR, paying royalties to use the principles of Villchur's patent. When the Electro-Voice Company refused to pay the royalties, AR sued them for patent infringement. Electro-Voice countersued, claiming prior art in the form of a mention of an air spring in a different system. The ensuing lawsuit resulted in the loss of the patent for Acoustic Research, a decision which Villchur chose not to appeal. In an interview about the case, Villchur says that he knew the judge's decision to void the patent was incorrect, but that he felt he had better things to do than to spend his life in litigation. He cited the example of Edwin Howard Armstrong, the inventor of FM radio, whose patent was rendered unprofitable through the actions of RCA. Armstrong spent years unsuccessfully fighting that injustice, and eventually committed suicide. Villchur decided not to contest the loss of his loudspeaker patent, but rather to move on and continue improving the quality of high fidelity equipment.

The first acoustic-suspension loudspeaker, the AR-1, was introduced at the New York Audio Show in 1954, and was an instant success. Villchur continued to improve loudspeakers, coming out with new models roughly every two years. The AR-2, produced in 1956, was a no-frills version of the speaker at a lower price. The independent testing agency Consumers Union, publisher of Consumer Reports magazine, did a report on loudspeakers that year. The AR-2 was one of only four speakers that received the Check Rating for highest quality, regardless of price. Of the four speakers that received the check rating, two were made by AR, and two were made by KLH under license from AR. After the CU rating, sales tripled.

Villchur continued to research improvements in sound reproduction, turning his attention to the tweeter. He received U.S. patent 3,033,945 for his invention of the direct-radiator dome tweeter. This greatly improved high-frequency fidelity by its smooth response and wide dispersion of sound, and complemented the acoustic suspension woofer's improved bass response. The AR-3, which combined the acoustic suspension woofer with the dome tweeter, is considered Villchur's ultimate achievement in speakers. An example of this model is on display in the Information Age Exhibit of The National Museum of American History at The Smithsonian Institution in Washington, DC. Virtually every loudspeaker today uses Villchur's innovations: Acoustic Suspension Woofers and Dome Tweeters.

Villchur continued to do research, production design, and technical writing during his tenure as president of AR. One of his strongly held views was that the only appropriate criterion to determine the quality of high-fidelity components was comparison with the actual live music in performance. In keeping with that philosophy, AR produced a series of "Live versus Recorded" concerts in which live performances by musical ensembles were compared with previously taped performances played through AR stereo equipment. Musicians participating in these concerts included the Fine Arts String Quartet and classical guitarist Gustavo Lopez, as well as performances on a thirty-two foot pipe organ and an old-fashioned nickelodeon. The Washington Post featured the Live vs. Recorded concerts with a half-page article with pictures, providing free publicity for AR, in which they said that audiences were fooled over and over by the seamless transitions between live performance and sound reproduced through the AR speakers.

As president of AR, Villchur was known for progressive employment practices and innovative advertising techniques. AR used equal opportunity employment practices, and employees received health insurance and profit sharing—benefits which were highly unusual in any but the largest firms in the 1950s and 1960s. The company was also known for its liberal repair policies, fixing most products for free no matter how old they were, and in general providing excellent customer service.

AR's advertising was distinct from the sensationalistic ads of its competitors, instead concentrating on technical information, reviews by impartial critics, and endorsements from well-known musicians and other personalities who actually used Acoustic Research components. Villchur believed that each ad should provide accurate information and unsolicited endorsements in order to convince the reader of the quality of the product. The list of well-known artists who appeared with their AR stereo equipment in print advertisements included Virgil Thomson, Miles Davis, and Louis Armstrong.

In addition, the company established locations called "Music Rooms" where the public could listen to music through AR components and could ask questions of knowledgeable hosts, but where no selling took place. The most famous of the Music Rooms was in Grand Central Station, and became known as a quiet haven in the middle of the noisy terminal. During one year the New York Music Room counted over one hundred thousand visitors. Another Music Room was located in Cambridge, Massachusetts at Harvard Square.

In 1961, Villchur designed a turntable (record player), and published an article explaining its several innovations. The tone arm and turntable platen were mounted together and suspended independently from the body of the turntable, so that a shock to the body of the turntable would have little effect on the playing of the record. Indeed, Villchur was fond of demonstrating this independent suspension by hitting the wooden base of the turntable with a mallet while the record played on flawlessly. The mechanical isolation of the tone-arm-platen assembly from the base had a further advantage. It eliminated the "muddy" bass sound that often resulted when vibrations from the loudspeaker were conducted through the floor and caused feedback through the pickup into the amplifier.

The low mass and damped suspension of the tone arm itself compensated for any irregularities on the surface of the disk so that even warped records could often be played without distortion. When released, the tone arm floated down to the record, so that if it were dropped, it would not crash into the disc (which could harm both the needle and the record). With its quiet motor and precision-ground rubber drive belt, the turntable had extremely low wow and flutter (the lowest of any turntable on the market at that time), and far exceeded the National Association of Broadcasters (National Association of Broadcasters) standards for turntable measurements. The overall look of the turntable was given an award by Industrial Design magazine.

Acoustic Research continued to expand its loudspeaker line, producing the smaller "bookshelf" speaker, the AR-4, which was popular among college students and younger families. In 1966, Stereo Review's yearly summary of the high-fidelity equipment showed that AR's loudspeaker sales represented almost one-third of the entire market, a share that had never been achieved by any hi-fi company before that, and which has never been equalled since.

In 1967, Villchur sold AR to Teledyne, and signed an agreement not to go into business in the field of sound reproduction equipment. Teledyne kept the AR name, and continued to produce stereo equipment. Although it was Villchur's plan for the company to produce a complete set of sound reproduction components, he sold the company before the amplifier and receiver became part of the line.

== Hearing aid research and development, and death ==
After selling AR, Villchur turned to hearing aid research, feeling there was considerable room for improvement with the devices. He pointed out to an interviewer that when you see a person with eyeglasses, you assume that whatever vision problem they might have is fully corrected by their glasses. But when you see a person with a hearing aid, you assume that the person still has hearing difficulties. He set out to change that, and spent several years investigating the problem in his home laboratory in Woodstock, NY.

Villchur worked with many volunteer subjects to analyze the various types of hearing loss. He discovered that traditional hearing aids of the day amplified loud sounds to the same extent as quiet sounds. He quickly realized, however, that quiet sounds needed more amplification than loud sounds. In fact, loud sounds might need no amplification at all. Many of his subjects complained that their hearing aids made soft sounds audible, but amplified moderately loud sounds to a painful level.

By 1973, he had come up with a concept based on the early work of Steinberg and Gardner on loudness recruitment, proposing multi-channel compression to make up for the variable loss of loudness compression (recruitment). Each patient's audiogram, combined with individual testing, would determine a custom gain-map program keyed to the individual person. The multi-channel system was adapted to an individual's hearing losses in specific frequency ranges, providing amplification where needed. Equally important, one band would not "pump" another. For example, the bass would not control the gain in the mid and high frequency bands. More importantly, he used "wide dynamic range compression" (WDRC). Unlike the previous "compression limiting" circuits, which limited loud sounds to a certain level but did nothing to increase the gain for quiet sounds, Villchur's WDRC amplifiers increased gain for softer sounds without excessively amplifying louder sounds.

Rather than apply for a patent, he decided to publish his findings and make them freely available. Fred Waldhauer of Bell Labs heard Villchur lecture on this new hearing aid system, and started a Bell Labs project to develop a hearing aid. Bell Labs assigned a team of experts, including Jont B. Allen, David A. Berkley, Joseph L. Hall and Harry Levitt (City University of NY, Graduate center). Bell Labs developed the first analog circuit, a three-band WDRC, at Allentown PA. This development circuit and effort was then purchased by Rodney Perkins, who created ReSound. Several of the Bell Labs development team from the Holmdel facility went on to work for ReSound, and bought the rights from them for the technology. Based on the AT&T design, and manufactured by AT&T, a programmable hearing aid based on Villchur's principles was marketed under the ReSound label. This effort has been documented in the article by Jont Allen. Over the next twenty-five years, Villchur's innovations became the industry standard for hearing aid design. It is nearly impossible to find a hearing aid today – digital or analog – that does not use multi-channel wide dynamic range compression.

Edgar Villchur has written three books and over one hundred and fifty articles on high fidelity, sound reproduction, audio engineering, and hearing aid technology in both peer-reviewed scientific journals and popular magazines, including two articles written when he was ninety years old. At the 1995 meeting of the Acoustical Society of America he received the Life Achievement Award from the American Auditory Society.

Edgar Villchur died on Monday, October 17, 2011 of natural causes at his Woodstock, New York home, his daughter, Miriam Villchur said. He was 94.

== Books by Edgar Villchur ==
- Villchur, Edgar (1999). Acoustics for Audiologists. Singular Publishing Group. ISBN 0-7693-0064-2.
- Villchur, Edgar (1965). Reproduction of Sound. Dover Publications. ISBN 0-486-21515-6.
- Villchur, Edgar (1957). Handbook of Sound Reproduction. Radio Magazines. ISBN 1-114-68559-3.

== Bibliography ==
=== Sound reproduction ===
Articles by Edgar Villchur

- Villchur, E. (1954) "Revolutionary Loudspeaker and Enclosure," Audio 38, October 1954, p. 25-27, 100.
- Villchur, E. (1957) "Problems of Bass Reproduction in Loudspeakers" Journal of the Audio Engineering Society Vol. 5, No. 3, July 1957, pp. 122–126.
- Villchur, E. (1958) "New High-Frequency Speaker," Audio 42, October 1958, p. 38.
- Villchur, E. (1961) "High Fidelity to What?" Saturday Review, November 25, 1961.
- Villchur, E. (1962) "A New Turntable-Arm Design," Audio, September and October 1962.
- Villchur, E. (1962) Reproduction of Sound in High-Fidelity, rev. ed., New York: Dover Publications, 1965; 1st published in Cambridge, Mass.: Acoustic Research, 1962.
- Villchur, E. (1962) "A Method of Testing Loudspeakers with Random Noise Input", Journal of the Audio Engineering Society, October 1962, Vol. 10, No.4, 306–309.
- Villchur, E. (1964) "High Fidelity Measurements - Science Or Chaos?" Electronics World, August 1964 p. 33-35, 54,
- Villchur, E. (1964) "Techniques of Making Live-Versus-Recorded Comparisons," Audio, October 1964.
- Villchur, E. (1986) "Comments on 'Theory, ingenuity, and wishful wizardry in loudspeaker design—A half-century of progress?'" [Journal of the Acoustical Society of America 77, No. 4, April 1985, p. 1303-1308] Journal of the Acoustical Society of America 79, No. 1, January 1986 [Letter].
- Villchur, E. (2000) "A Short History of the Dynamic Loudspeaker," Voice Coil, July 2000, p. 26-32, paper presented at the 133rd meeting, Acoustical Society of America, June 1997.

=== Hearing aids ===
Articles by Edgar Villchur

- Villchur, E. (1973) "Signal processing to improve speech intelligibility in perceptive deafness," Journal of the Acoustical Society of America, 53, No. 6, 1646–1657.
- Villchur, E. (1974) "Simulation of the effect of recruitment on loudness relationships in speech," Journal of the Acoustical Society of America, 56, 1601–1611. (Recording bound in with article).
- Villchur, E. (1977) "Electronic models to simulate the effect of sensory distortions on speech perception by the deaf," Journal of the Acoustical Society of America, 62, 665–674.
- Villchur, E. (1987) "Multichannel Compression processing for profound deafness," Journal of Rehabilitation Research and Development, 24, 135–138.
- Villchur, E. and Waldhauer, F. (1988) "Full Dynamic Range Multiband Compression in a Hearing Aid," The Hearing Journal, Sep. 1988.
- Villchur, E. (1989) "Comments on 'The negative effect of amplitude compression in multichannel hearing aids in the light of the modulation-transfer function,'" Journal of the Acoustical Society of America, 86, 425-427 [Letter]
- Villchur, E. (1993) "A Different Approach to the Noise Problem of the Hearing Impaired" American Journal of Audiology July 1993, 47–51. Transcription of a presentation made at the Mayo Clinic. Online at:
- Villchur, E. (1996) "Multichannel Compression in Hearing Aids," in Hair Cells and Hearing Aids, C. Berlin ed., Singular Publishing Group, Inc. San Diego, 1996.
- Villchur, E. (2004) "Elements of Effective Hearing-Aid Performance," Audiology Online, February 2004. Online at: https://www.audiologyonline.com/articles/article_detail.asp?article_id=565
- Villchur, E. (2008) "Compression in Hearing Aids: Why Fast Multichannel Processing Systems Work Well." Hearing Review, June 2008.
