= Prefab Sprout discography =

- Studio albums: 10
- EPs: 1
- Compilation albums: 3
- Singles: 28
- Video albums: 2
- Box sets: 4

This is the discography of British pop band Prefab Sprout.

== Albums ==
=== Studio albums ===
Title	Album details	Peak chart positions											Certifications
Title	Album details	UK	AUS	FIN	FRA	GER	NL	NOR	NZ	SPA	SWE	US	Certifications
Swoon	Released: March 1984; Label: Kitchenware, Epic; Formats: LP, MC	22	—	—	—	—	—	—	—	—	—	—	
Steve McQueen	Released: 10 June 1985; Label: Kitchenware, Epic; Formats: CD, LP, MC; Released in the US and Canada as Two Wheels Good	21	48	—	—	—	34	—	33	—	—	178	BPI: Gold
From Langley Park to Memphis	Released: 14 March 1988; Label: Kitchenware, Epic; Formats: CD, LP, MC	5	58	40	—	—	49	—	34	29	18	—	BPI: Gold
Protest Songs	Released: 19 June 1989; Label: Kitchenware; Formats: CD, LP, MC	18	—	—	—	—	—	—	—	—	—	—	BPI: Silver
Jordan: The Comeback	Released: 28 August 1990; Label: Kitchenware, Epic; Formats: CD, LP, MC	7	148	—	—	—	69	—	—	—	17	—	BPI: Gold
Andromeda Heights	Released: 2 May 1997; Label: Kitchenware; Formats: CD, MD, MC	7	—	37	35	83	—	28	—	—	9	—	
The Gunman and Other Stories	Released: 18 June 2001; Label: Liberty EMI; Formats: CD, MC	60	—	—	—	74	—	—	—	—	—	—	
I Trawl the Megahertz	Released: 27 May 2003; Label: Liberty EMI; Formats: CD; Released as a Paddy McAloon solo album; reissued under the band name in 2019	54	—	—	—	—	—	—	—	—	—	—	
Let's Change the World with Music	Released: 7 September 2009; Label: Kitchenware; Formats: CD	39	—	—	—	46	—	16	—	92	28	—	
Crimson/Red	Released: 7 October 2013; Label: Icebreaker; Formats: CD, LP, digital download	15	—	—	144	42	—	7	—	—	10	—	
"—" denotes releases that did not chart or were not released in that territory.

=== Compilation albums ===
Title	Album details	Peak chart positions	Certifications
Title	Album details	UK	Certifications
A Life of Surprises: The Best of Prefab Sprout	Released: 26 June 1992; Label: Kitchenware/Columbia; Formats: CD, LP, MC	3	BPI: Gold
38 Carat Collection	Released: 18 October 1999; Label: Kitchenware/Columbia; Formats: 2xCD, 2xMD	95	
Kings of Rock & Roll – The Best of Prefab Sprout	Released: 26 November 2007; Label: Music Club Deluxe; Formats: 2xCD	—	
"—" denotes releases that did not chart.

=== Box sets ===
Title	Album details
Steve McQueen / From Langley Park to Memphis	Released: March 1995; Label: Kitchenware/Columbia; Formats: 2xCD
Swoon / Steve McQueen	Released: 17 September 2007; Label: Sony BMG/Kitchenware/Columbia; Formats: 2xCD
From Langley Park to Memphis / Jordan: The Comeback	Released: 24 September 2007; Label: Sony BMG/Kitchenware/Columbia; Formats: 2xCD
Original Album Classics	Released: 27 March 2009; Label: Sony Music/Kitchenware/Legacy; Formats: 5xCD

=== Video albums ===
Title	Album details
From Langley Park to Hollywood	Released: 1989; Label: CMV Enterprises; Formats: VHS, LaserDisc
The Best of Prefab Sprout: A Life of Surprises – The Video Collection	Released: 1992; Label: SMV Enterprises; Formats: VHS, LaserDisc

== EPs ==
Title	Album details	Peak chart positions
Title	Album details	UK
Jordan: The EP	Released: 24 December 1990; Label: Kitchenware; Formats: 7", 12", CD, MC	35

== Singles ==
Title	Year	Peak chart positions										Album
Title	Year	UK	UK Indie	AUS	GER	IRE	NL	NZ	SPA	US Dance	US Main	Album
"Lions in My Own Garden (Exit Someone)"	1982	—	16	—	—	—	—	—	—	—	—	Non-album singles
"The Devil Has All the Best Tunes"	1983	—	14	—	—	—	—	—	—	—	—	Non-album singles
"Don't Sing"	1984	62	—	—	—	—	—	—	—	—	—	Swoon
"Couldn't Bear to Be Special"	1984	—	—	—	—	—	—	—	—	—	—	Swoon
"When Love Breaks Down"	1984	89	—	—	—	—	—	—	—	—	—	Steve McQueen
"When Love Breaks Down" (remix)	1985	25	—	55	—	26	—	38	—	—	42	Steve McQueen
"Faron Young"	1985	74	—	—	—	—	—	—	—	—	—	Steve McQueen
"Appetite"	1985	92	—	45	—	—	—	—	—	—	—	Steve McQueen
"Johnny Johnny" (called "Goodbye Lucille #1" on the album)	1986	64	—	—	—	28	—	—	—	—	—	Steve McQueen
"Cars and Girls"	1988	44	—	41	—	—	—	—	13	—	—	From Langley Park to Memphis
"The King of Rock 'n' Roll"	1988	7	—	—	—	6	—	—	38	—	—	From Langley Park to Memphis
"Hey Manhattan!"	1988	72	—	—	—	—	—	—	—	—	—	From Langley Park to Memphis
"Nightingales"	1988	78	—	—	—	—	—	—	—	—	—	From Langley Park to Memphis
"The Golden Calf"	1989	82	—	—	—	—	—	—	—	—	—	From Langley Park to Memphis
"Looking for Atlantis"	1990	51	—	145	—	—	—	—	—	—	—	Jordan: The Comeback
"We Let the Stars Go"	1990	50	—	—	—	—	—	—	—	—	—	Jordan: The Comeback
"The Sound of Crying"	1992	23	—	—	79	—	—	—	—	—	—	A Life of Surprises: The Best of Prefab Sprout
"If You Don't Love Me"	1992	33	—	—	60	—	—	—	—	3	—	A Life of Surprises: The Best of Prefab Sprout
"All the World Loves Lovers"	1992	61	—	—	—	—	—	—	—	—	—	A Life of Surprises: The Best of Prefab Sprout
"Life of Surprises"	1992	24	—	—	—	—	—	—	—	—	—	A Life of Surprises: The Best of Prefab Sprout
"I Remember That"	1993	—	—	—	—	—	—	—	—	—	—	A Life of Surprises: The Best of Prefab Sprout
"A Prisoner of the Past"	1997	30	—	—	86	—	—	—	—	—	—	Andromeda Heights
"Electric Guitars"	1997	53	—	—	—	—	—	—	—	—	—	Andromeda Heights
"Where the Heart Is"	2000	151	—	—	—	—	—	—	—	—	—	38 Carat Collection
"Cowboy Dreams"	2001	—	—	—	—	—	—	—	—	—	—	The Gunman and Other Stories
"Wild Card in the Pack"	2001	—	—	—	—	—	86	—	—	—	—	The Gunman and Other Stories
"Let There Be Music"	2009	—	—	—	—	—	—	—	—	—	—	Let's Change the World with Music
"The Best Jewel Thief in the World"	2013	—	—	—	—	—	—	—	—	—	—	Crimson/Red
"—" denotes releases that did not chart or were not released in that territory.
