= 38 Carat Collection =

Compilation album by Prefab Sprout
- Released: October 1999
- Genre: Pop
- Label: Columbia
- Producer: Thomas Dolby, Prefab Sprout, David Brewis, Jon Kelly

Prefab Sprout chronology
Andromeda Heights (1997)	38 Carat Collection (1999)	The Gunman and Other Stories (2001)

Singles from 38 Carat Collection
- 1. "Where the Heart Is" Released: May 2000

38 Carat Collection (released as The Collection in the U.S.) is a compilation album by the English pop band Prefab Sprout, released in October 1999 by Columbia Records. It was issued in a double CD version. Each disc is arranged in chronological order, with most of the group's singles appearing on disc 1 ("The Devil Has All the Best Tunes" is omitted, and "All The World Loves Lovers" and "I Remember That" appear on the second CD) and tracks from their six previous studio albums on disc 2.

"Where the Heart Is", the theme from the TV series of same name, was issued as a single in May 2000.

== Track listing ==
=== Disc 1 ===
1. "Lions in My Own Garden (Exit Someone)" (stand-alone single)
2. "Don't Sing" (from Swoon)
3. "Couldn't Bear to Be Special" (from Swoon)
4. "When Love Breaks Down" (from Steve McQueen)
5. "Faron Young" (from Steve McQueen)
6. "Appetite" (from Steve McQueen)
7. "Johnny Johnny" (from Steve McQueen)
8. "Cars and Girls" (from From Langley Park to Memphis)
9. "The King of Rock 'n' Roll" (from From Langley Park to Memphis)
10. "Hey Manhattan!" (from From Langley Park to Memphis)
11. "The Golden Calf" (from From Langley Park to Memphis)
12. "Looking for Atlantis" (from Jordan: The Comeback)
13. "We Let the Stars Go" (from Jordan: The Comeback)
14. "Carnival 2000" (from Jordan: The Comeback)
15. "The Sound of Crying" (from A Life of Surprises: The Best of Prefab Sprout)
16. "If You Don't Love Me" (from A Life of Surprises: The Best of Prefab Sprout)
17. "Life of Surprises" (from Protest Songs)
18. "A Prisoner of the Past" (from Andromeda Heights)
19. "Electric Guitars" (from Andromeda Heights)

=== Disc 2 ===
1. "Cue Fanfare" (from Swoon)
2. "Cruel" (from Swoon)
3. "Bonny" (from Steve McQueen)
4. "Moving the River" (from Steve McQueen)
5. "Desire As" (from Steve McQueen)
6. "Horsin' Around" (from Steve McQueen)
7. "Pearly Gates" (from Protest Songs)
8. "'Til the Cows Come Home" (from Protest Songs)
9. "Enchanted" (from From Langley Park to Memphis)
10. "I Remember That" (from From Langley Park to Memphis)
11. "Nightingales" (from From Langley Park to Memphis)
12. "Jordan: The Comeback" (from Jordan: The Comeback)
13. "All the World Loves Lovers" (from Jordan: The Comeback)
14. "Jesse James Bolero" (from Jordan: The Comeback)
15. "Doo Wop in Harlem" (from Jordan: The Comeback)
16. "Life's a Miracle" (from Andromeda Heights)
17. "Swans" (from Andromeda Heights)
18. "Andromeda Heights" (from Andromeda Heights)
19. "Where the Heart Is" (theme from the TV series of the same name)
