= Steve Adey discography =

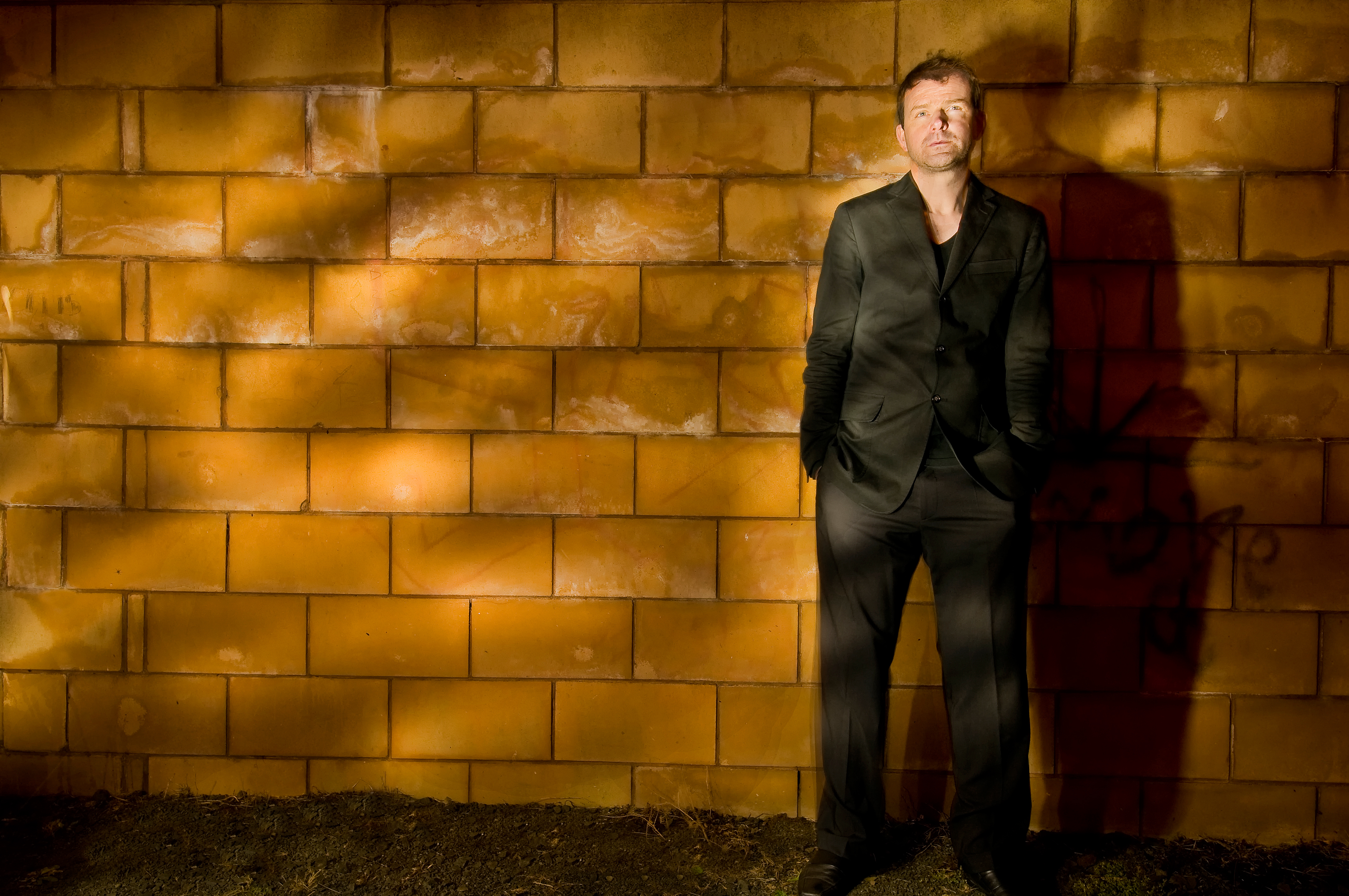
- Studio albums: 2
- Extended plays: 2
- Singles: 4
- Music videos: 3
- Other releases: 2

This is a list of released recordings by English singer, songwriter Steve Adey. To date, Adey has released two studio albums and various EPs and singles.

== Studio albums ==
Title	Album details	Peak chart positions	
Title	Album details	UK	
All Things Real	Released: 6 March 2006; Labels: Grand Harmonium; Formats: CD, LP, DD	165	165
The Tower of Silence	Released: 26 November 2012; Labels: Grand Harmonium; Formats: CD, LP, DD	177	177
TBC	Released: 2015; Labels: Formats:		

== EPs ==
Title	Album details
Mississippi Remixed	Released: Jan? 2007; Label: Grand Harmonium; Format: DD
These Resurrections	Released: May? 2011; Label: Grand Harmonium; Format: CD, DD

== Singles ==
List of singles
Year	Single	Album
2006	"Find the Way"	All Things Real
2007	"Burning Fields" (7")	Non album track
2012	"Just Wait Till I Get You Home"	The Tower of Silence
2012	"Laughing"	The Tower of Silence

== Videos ==
List of music videos with directors
Year	Title	Director	Ref
2006	"Find The Way"	Richard Boa	
2012	"Just Wait Till I Get You Home"	Joachim Vesely	
2012	"Laughing"	Oana Nechifor	

== Other releases ==
List of other appearances and contributions
Year	Song	Release	Label	Ref
2006	Mississippi (A Marble Calm remix)	Blue Turns To Grey (12")	Tonefloat	
2006	"Mississippi"	Mind the Gap nr63	Gonzo Circus	
