= A Prisoner of the Past =

Single by Prefab Sprout

from the album Andromeda Heights
- Released: 21 April 1997
- Recorded: 1997
- Genre: Pop
- Length: 5:03 (album version) 3:51 (single edit)
- Label: Kitchenware
- Songwriter: Paddy McAloon
- Producers: Paddy McAloon, Calum Malcolm

Prefab Sprout singles chronology
"I Remember That" (1993)	"A Prisoner of the Past" (1997)	"Electric Guitars" (1997)

"A Prisoner of the Past" is a single by English pop band Prefab Sprout, released by Kitchenware Records on 21 April 1997. It was the lead single from Andromeda Heights, the band's first studio album in seven years. Frontman Paddy McAloon wrote the song in 1989, inspired by the work of Phil Spector. Upon release, the song received critical acclaim and reached number 30 on the UK Singles Chart. It remains the band's final top 40 hit to date.

== Composition ==
Paddy McAloon originally wrote "A Prisoner of the Past" in the spring of 1989 for a proposed album of songs where he imagined he was writing for Phil Spector, wishing to emulate "all the niceties of Sixties pop music but with a more modern lyrical twist". "River Deep – Mountain High", a 1966 Spector production for Ike & Tina Turner, was a specific inspiration, though McAloon ultimately felt too small a recording space and too few musicians made it "impossible to create the Spector sound". McAloon has described it as a revenge song, with the lyrics being a stalker's threat to a former lover. His "pathetic dream of revenge" is the notion that both of them will become ghosts.

== Release ==
Prefab Sprout performed "A Prisoner of the Past" on BBC1's The National Lottery Live two days ahead of its release date of 21 April 1997. The song was playlisted by British radio stations including BBC Radio 1, BBC Radio 2, Virgin Radio, Heart London and Key 103 Manchester. It made number 35 on Music Week's Top 50 Airplay Hits chart on 26 April 1997. It entered the UK Singles Chart at its peak of number 30 on 4 May 1997, ultimately spending two weeks on the chart. A black and white music video was produced for the song featuring the band in a manor house.

== Reception ==
Amongst contemporary reviews, the song was met with a warm reception. Several reviewers commented on the song's 1960s-inspired sound, and some made comparisons to the work of Scott Walker and The Divine Comedy. The Guardian's Phil Daoust considered the song "beautiful and seductive in a horrible kind of way, not least because it's an unashamed homage to Phil Spector." Writing for the Italian magazine Musica, Enrico Sisti declared "A Prisoner of the Past" "a "Be My Baby" for 2000". Writing for the Sunday Tribune, Colm O'Callaghan highlighted the song's "wash of cinemascope strings and timpani drums over McAloon's lispish reverie", but felt the song could only really measure up in the context of Andromeda Heights. Bob Eborall wrote in the Ealing Leader that the track was "catchy" and "a winner", while an uncredited writer for the Irish Independent praised McAloon's "typically florid melody structures" and described the song as "as exquisite as anything from his glorious past". Mojo's Chris Ingham was unfavourable, describing the song as "over-arranged" and "disappointing".

In 1999, Tom Ewing of Freaky Trigger ranked "A Prisoner of the Past" at number 72 in his list of the "Top 100 Singles of the 90s". Ewing praised the song's "preposterous, sheer melodrama", describing it as "pure diva pop" and "a mock-epic of Broadway proportions, dwarfing everything on its puny parent album Andromeda Heights".

== Track listings ==
CD1

1. "A Prisoner of the Past" (Radio Edit) – 3:51
2. "A Prisoner of the Past" (Album Version) – 5:03
3. "Just Because I Can" – 3:55
4. "Where the Heart Is" – 2:04

CD2

1. "A Prisoner of the Past" (Radio Edit) – 3:51
2. "Just Because I Can" – 3:54
3. The King of Rock 'n' Roll – 4:22
4. Cars and Girls – 4:26
