= Tower of Silence (disambiguation) =

A Tower of Silence, or Dakhma, is a Zoroastrian structure used for excarnation.

Tower of Silence may also refer to:

- Tower of Silence, a 2023 novel by Larry Correia
- The Tower of Silence (album), a 2012 album by Steve Adey
- The Tower of Silence (film), a 1924 German film directed by Johannes Guter
- The Tower of Silence (novel), a 2013 novel by Phiroshaw Jamsetjee Chevalier
- Towers of Silence (film), a 1952 West German adventure film directed by Hans Bertram
- The Towers of Silence, a 1971 novel by Paul Scott
