= The Sound of Crying =

Single by Prefab Sprout

from the album A Life of Surprises: The Best of Prefab Sprout
- Released: June 1992
- Recorded: 1992
- Genre: Pop
- Length: 4:44
- Label: Kitchenware
- Songwriter: Paddy McAloon
- Producer: Steve Lipson

Prefab Sprout singles chronology
"Jordan - The EP" (1991)	"The Sound of Crying" (1992)	"If You Don't Love Me" (1992)

"The Sound of Crying" is a single by English pop band Prefab Sprout, released by Kitchenware Records in June 1992. It was one of two new songs included on their compilation album A Life of Surprises: The Best of Prefab Sprout. It was one of the band's biggest hits, reaching No. 23 on the UK Singles Chart.

== Composition ==
Paddy McAloon originally wrote the song in April 1990 for a proposed biographical album about Michael Jackson, whom he was fascinated by. In this version, the song's verses listed unhappy events in Jackson's life, while the chorus was "only the boogie music will never, ever let you down". McAloon was prompted to rewrite the song by George H. W. Bush's references to a new world order during the Gulf War. The final lyrics concern the plights of people around the world, and ask why they cannot be helped. McAloon felt that "no matter how well-regulated you make the world, no matter how well-regulated our affairs are, disasters are kind of there" and described "The Sound of Crying" as "a 'Why does God allow this?' song".

== Release ==
"The Sound of Crying" received significant airplay on BBC Radio 1, and became Prefab Sprout's first top 30 hit on the UK Singles Chart since "The King of Rock 'n' Roll" reached number 7 four years earlier. It peaked at number 23, and remains the band's second highest-charting single to date. A music video featuring the band was produced and was included on the VHS release "A Life of Surprises: The Video Collection".

== Reception ==
Upon release, Jim Lawn of the Lennox Herald called "The Sound of Crying" "Paddy McAloon's best chance of a hit single in ages". The Times' Alan Jackson commented that the song's "lush production and glorious melody" were used "to sneak one of the oldest debates in Christendom before millions of Radio 1 listeners" while David Cavanagh of Select praised how the song "manages to include ice-cool phraseology like 'the music of the spheres' while still being catchy enough to be this week’s third most played single on Radio 1".

== Track listings ==
=== 7" ===
Side 1

1. "The Sound Of Crying (Edit)"

Side 2

1. "The Sound Of Crying (Full Version)"

=== CD ===
1. "The Sound Of Crying (Edit)
2. "The Sound Of Crying (Full Version)"
3. "Looking For Atlantis"
4. "The Golden Calf"

== Charts ==
Chart (1992)	Peak position
Australia (ARIA)	188
UK Singles (OCC)	23
UK Airplay (Music Week)	2
