= A Life of Surprises: The Best of Prefab Sprout =

Greatest hits album by Prefab Sprout
- Released: July 1992
- Genre: Pop
- Label: Columbia (Europe); Epic (US)
- Producer: Thomas Dolby; Prefab Sprout; Phil Thornalley; Stephen Lipson; David Brewis; Jon Kelly; Paddy McAloon; Andy Richards

Prefab Sprout chronology
Jordan: The Comeback (1990)	A Life of Surprises: The Best of Prefab Sprout (1992)	Andromeda Heights (1997)

Singles from A Life of Surprises: The Best of Prefab Sprout
- 1. "The Sound of Crying" Released: June 1992; 2. "If You Don't Love Me" Released: July 1992; 3. "All the World Loves Lovers" Released: September 1992; 4. "Life of Surprises" Released: December 1992; 5. "I Remember That" Released: March 1993

A Life of Surprises: The Best of Prefab Sprout is a compilation album by English pop band Prefab Sprout, released in July 1992 by Columbia Records in Europe and Epic Records in the United States. The album reached No. 3 on the UK Albums Chart.

== Content ==
The compilation features selections from Prefab Sprout's first five albums and two new songs, "The Sound of Crying" and "If You Don't Love Me", both of which were issued as singles. Three canonical album tracks – "Life of Surprises" from Protest Songs (1989), "I Remember That" from From Langley Park to Memphis (1988) and "All the World Loves Lovers" from Jordan: The Comeback (1990) – were also released as singles to promote the compilation.

== Critical reception ==
Professional ratings
Review scores
Source	Rating
AllMusic	4.5/5 stars
NME	8/10

In a review of the album for AllMusic, Michael Sutton said that Prefab Sprout created "gorgeously crafted pop songs" and that "A Life of Surprises is an engaging introduction to a group that is nowhere near as bizarre as its name." He described frontman Paddy McAloon as having a "warm, comforting voice [whose] soothing croon can sometimes hide some pretty depressing lyrics. Sutton went on to opine that despite this, "Prefab Sprout isn't one of those grim British raincoat bands", with the group having "a number of wonderfully upbeat moments".

== Track listing ==
All tracks composed by Paddy McAloon.

No.	Title	Original album	Length
1.	"The King of Rock 'n' Roll"	From Langley Park to Memphis, 1988	4:23
2.	"When Love Breaks Down"	Steve McQueen, 1985	4:08
3.	"The Sound of Crying"	previously unreleased	4:44
4.	"Faron Young"	Steve McQueen	3:47
5.	"Carnival 2000"	Jordan: The Comeback, 1990	3:21
6.	"Goodbye Lucille #1 (Johnny Johnny)"	Steve McQueen	4:27
7.	"I Remember That"	From Langley Park to Memphis	4:15
8.	"Cruel"	Swoon, 1984	4:18
9.	"Cars and Girls"	From Langley Park to Memphis	4:26
10.	"We Let the Stars Go"	Jordan: The Comeback	3:34
11.	"Life of Surprises"	Protest Songs, 1989	4:04
12.	"Appetite"	Steve McQueen	3:56
13.	"If You Don't Love Me"	previously unreleased	3:43
14.	"Wild Horses"	Jordan: The Comeback	3:41
15.	"Hey Manhattan!"	From Langley Park to Memphis	4:46
16.	"All the World Loves Lovers"	Jordan: The Comeback	3:51

== Personnel ==
Adapted from the liner notes of A Life of Surprises and corresponding studio albums.

Prefab Sprout

- Paddy McAloon – lead vocals, various instruments
- Wendy Smith – backing vocals, guitar, keyboards
- Martin McAloon – bass guitar
- Neil Conti – drums (except track 8)

Additional musicians

- Stephen Lipson – additional instruments (tracks 3, 13)
- Peter-John Vettese – organ (track 13)
- Paul Harvey – guitar (track 13)
- Richard Cottle – keyboards (track 3)
- Wil Malone – strings arrangements (track 13)
- Gavyn Wright – strings leader (tracks 13, 15)
- Graham Lant – drums (track 8)
- Thomas Dolby – keyboards (tracks 1, 7)
- Gary Moberley – keyboards (track 9)
- Paul "Wix" Wickens – keyboards (track 9)
- Andy Richards – keyboards (track 15)
- Luís Jardim – percussion (tracks 9, 15)
- Pete Townshend – acoustic guitar (track 15)
- The Andraé Crouch Singers – vocals (track 7)
- John Altman – string arrangement, conductor (track 15)
- The Phantom Horns – horns (track 5)

Technical

- Thomas Dolby – producer (tracks 1, 4–7, 10, 12, 14, 16), remixer (track 2)
- Phil Thornalley – producer (track 2)
- Stephen Lipson – producer (tracks 3, 13), additional production (track 16), additional mixing (track 16)
- David Brewis – producer (track 8)
- Prefab Sprout – producer (tracks 8, 11)
- Jon Kelly – producer (track 9)
- Paddy McAloon – producer (track 9)
- Andy Richards – producer (track 15)
- Heff Moraes – engineer (tracks 3, 13, 16)
- David Leonard – mixing (tracks 1, 7)
- Richard Moakes – mixing (track 9)
- Tony Philips – mixing (track 15)
- Lance Phillips – mixing (track 11)
- Tim Young – mastering (tracks 1, 7, 9, 15)
- Peter Barrett – sleeve design
- Andrew Biscomb – sleeve design
- Douglas Brothers – photographs

== Charts ==
Chart (1992)	Peak position
UK Albums (OCC)	3

== Certifications ==
Region	Certification	Certified units/sales
United Kingdom (BPI)	Gold	100,000^{^}
^{^} Shipments figures based on certification alone.

== Video selection ==
As well as the popular audio formats of the time (LP, CD and cassette), A Life of Surprises was also released as a 45-minute-long VHS video with a slightly different track listing. The video features only 11 songs and does not include the title track, "A Life of Surprises", "Faron Young", "Wild Horses", "All the World Loves Lovers", "Goodbye Lucille #1", "I Remember That" or "Cruel". However, it does feature videos for "The Golden Calf" and "Looking for Atlantis". Thus only nine songs are common to both audio and video releases.

== Video track listing ==
1. "The King of Rock 'n' Roll"
2. "The Sound of Crying"
3. "Cars and Girls"
4. "We Let the Stars Go"
5. "The Golden Calf"
6. "Looking for Atlantis"
7. "Hey Manhattan!"
8. "If You Don't Love Me"
9. "When Love Breaks Down"
10. "Carnival 2000"
11. "Appetite"
