= The Gunman and Other Stories =

Studio album by Prefab Sprout
- Released: 18 June 2001
- Genre: Pop
- Label: EMI Liberty
- Producer: Tony Visconti

Prefab Sprout chronology
38 Carat Collection (1999)	The Gunman and Other Stories (2001)	I Trawl the Megahertz (2003)

Singles from The Gunman and Other Stories
- 1. "Wild Card in the Pack" Released: October 2001

Professional ratings
Review scores
Source	Rating
AllMusic	3/5 stars

The Gunman and Other Stories is the seventh studio album by the English pop band Prefab Sprout. Released in June 2001, it was the band's only album issued through the EMI Liberty label.

== Album history ==
Following the release of Andromeda Heights in 1997 and the compilation 38 Carat Collection in 1999, Prefab Sprout undertook their first UK tour in a decade. The tour's success prompted frontman Paddy McAloon to consider recording a new album. Rather than concentrating on new material, he chose to record songs he had previously written for other artists as a means of clearing his backlog before moving on to newer compositions.

Although drummer Neil Conti (who had left the band in 1992) participated in the tour, the studio recordings featured only Paddy and his brother Martin. Vocalist Wendy Smith was absent, having given birth the previous year and having other professional commitments in music therapy.

The album was produced by Tony Visconti, and made use of session musicians including Carlos Alomar, Jeff Pevar and Jordan Rudess. Eric Weissberg of "Duelling Banjos" fame, played the banjo on "Cowboy Dreams". Mixes were approved via e-mail between Visconti in New York and the McAloon brothers' base in County Durham.

The album included versions of five songs which Paddy McAloon originally wrote for other performers. "Cowboy Dreams", "I'm a Troubled Man", "Love Will Find Someone for You" and "Blue Roses" were originally recorded by Jimmy Nail in 1994 and 1996, respectively, while title track "The Gunman" was originally recorded by Cher on her 1995 album It's a Man's World.

The album was the least successful of the band's output, stalling at No. 60 in the UK Albums Chart.

One single was released from the album, "Wild Card in the Pack", in October 2001.

== Track listing ==
All songs written by Paddy McAloon unless noted otherwise:

1. "Cowboy Dreams"
2. "Wild Card in the Pack"
3. "I'm a Troubled Man"
4. "The Streets of Laredo" / "Not Long for This World" (traditional; arranged and adapted by Paddy McAloon/Paddy McAloon)
5. "Love Will Find Someone for You"
6. "Cornfield Ablaze"
7. "When You Get to Know Me Better"
8. "The Gunman"
9. "Blue Roses"
10. "Farmyard Cat"

The Japanese CD release also featured the "Cowboy Dreams" video as a CD extra as well as footage of the music video shoot and liner notes by Paddy McAloon.
