= Crimson/Red =

Studio album by Prefab Sprout
- Released: 7 October 2013
- Recorded: Autumn 2012
- Studio: Andromeda Heights Studio
- Genre: Pop
- Labels: Icebreaker; Kitchenware
- Producers: Calum Malcolm; Paddy McAloon

Prefab Sprout chronology
Let's Change the World with Music (2009)	Crimson/Red (2013)

Crimson/Red is the tenth studio album by English pop band Prefab Sprout, although for this album "Prefab Sprout" consists entirely of singer/songwriter Paddy McAloon, who writes, sings and plays every note on the album. Crimson/Red was released in the United Kingdom by Icebreaker Records and Kitchenware Records on 7 October 2013. The album title is a reference to artist Mark Rothko.

== Critical reception ==
Professional ratings
Aggregate scores
Source	Rating
AnyDecentMusic?	7.5/10
Metacritic	81/100
Review scores
Source	Rating
AllMusic	4/5 stars
The Guardian	4/5 stars
The Independent	4/5 stars
The Irish Times	4/5 stars
Mojo	4/5 stars
The Observer	4/5 stars
Q	4/5 stars
Record Collector	4/5 stars
The Times	4/5 stars
Uncut	8/10

In Mojo magazine, critic Danny Eccleston called Crimson/Red "the welcome return of Durham's song-craftsman supreme". The Observer's Phil Mongredien praised the album as "charming, articulate and urbane" (a lyric from "Devil Came a Calling"). Four-star ratings appeared in both The Independent and The Times, with the former describing Crimson/Red as a "lovely album from a true one-off".

David Jeffries of AllMusic said, "The music throughout is just as beautiful and bold as the lyrics", with "immaculate production and an overall classic album flow".

== Commercial reception ==
Crimson/Red was a chart success for Prefab Sprout. The album debuted at No. 15 in the UK Albums Chart, giving the band their highest-charting record since Andromeda Heights in 1997.

Crimson/Red debuted at No. 10 in Sweden and No. 21 in Norway, giving the band their second-highest chart positions ever in both countries. In its second week on the Norwegian charts, "Crimson/Red" climbed to No. 7, an all-time high for the band in Norway.

In Ireland, the album debuted at No. 40 (and No. 9 on the indie chart). In Germany, the album debuted at No. 42, making it Prefab Sprout's highest-charting album there.

Crimson/Red also charted in the Flanders region of Belgium (No. 83) and in Switzerland (No. 92).

== Track listing ==
All songs written by Paddy McAloon.

1. "The Best Jewel Thief in the World"
2. "List of Impossible Things"
3. "Adolescence"
4. "Grief Built the Taj Mahal"
5. "Devil Came a Calling"
6. "Billy"
7. "The Dreamer"
8. "The Songs of Danny Galway"
9. "The Old Magician"
10. "Mysterious"
