= All Things Real =

Studio album by Steve Adey
- Released: 6 March 2006
- Recorded: 2004–06
- Genre: Indie, alternative rock, Americana
- Length: 40:33
- Label: Grand Harmonium Records
- Producer: Steve Adey, Calum Malcolm – (Mastering Engineer)

Steve Adey chronology
| All Things Real (2006) | The Tower of Silence (2012) |

Professional ratings
Review scores
| Source | Rating |
|---|---|
| Americana UK | (8/10) |
| Contactmusic.com | (8/10) |
| Gigwise | 3/5 stars |
| No Ripcord | 8/10 stars |
| Scotsman | favorable |
| Signal to Noise | favorable |
| Stylus Magazine | B |
| Sunday Herald | 4/5 stars |
| Sunday Times | 4/5 stars |
| MusicOMH | 2/5 stars |
| Uncut | 3/5 stars |

All Things Real is the debut album by English singer-songwriter Steve Adey. The album was released on 6 March 2006 through Grand Harmonium Records. The album comprises original compositions, plus covers of Bob Dylan's Shelter from the Storm and Will Oldham's I See a Darkness.

The song "Mississippi" was written about American singer Jeff Buckley, while the song "Mary Margaret O'Hara" is a tribute to Canadian singer/actress Mary Margaret O'Hara.

Two singles from the album were released; Find The Way which included two new acoustic versions of Find The Way and Mississippi and Mississippi: Remixed, a download-only EP featuring Kramer, Sweet Billy Pilgrim and A Marble Calm. The A Marble Calm remix was also released on 12" vinyl through Tonefloat Records).

== Track listing ==
1. "Death To All Things Real" 1.41
2. "I See A Darkness" 4.40
3. "The Lost Boat Song" 4.51
4. "Mary Margaret O'Hara" 1.05
5. "Find The Way" 4.29
6. "Shelter From The Storm" 8.03
7. "Evening Of The Day" 4.24
8. "Tonight" 1.31
9. "The Last Remark" 4.28
10. "Mississippi" 5.12
