= The Headboys =

Scottish band

- Origin: Scotland
- Genres: Power pop, new wave
- Years active: 1977–1980
- Label: RSO Records
- Past members: Lou Lewis; George Boyter; Calum Malcolm; Davy Ross; Bob Heatlie

The Headboys were a Scottish power pop band, formed in 1977 in Edinburgh, originally under the name of Badger.

== Career ==
The band is best known for its single "The Shape of Things to Come", which entered the UK Singles Chart on 22 September 1979. The track spent eight weeks on the chart, reaching number 45. This secured the band an appearance on Top of the Pops on 11 October 1979; the debut show for host Andy Peebles.

The group released an album in 1979 on Robert Stigwood's RSO label, which was produced by Peter Ker (who also worked with the Motors, and Bram Tchaikovsky).

The lack of any other UK chart hit left them labelled as one-hit wonders.

In 2013, the band announced on their Facebook page that the ten tracks they had recorded for a follow-up album, but which remained unreleased, would be issued on CD under the title The Lost Album by the American record label, Pop Detective Records. The album, issued on 1 December that year, was dedicated to the memory of drummer Davy Ross, who died in November 2010. George Boyter died in September 2022. Bob Heatlie died on 8 April 2023, at the age of 76. Lou Lewis died in June 2024. Calum Malcolm now remains as the only living ex-member of the group.

== Band members ==
- Lou Lewis — guitar and vocals
- George Boyter — bass and vocals
- Calum Malcolm — keyboards and vocals
- Davy Ross — drums and vocals
- Bob Heatlie — keyboards, sax, vocals

== Discography ==
=== Albums ===
- The Headboys (1979), US number 113 Canada number 69 AUS number 43
- The Lost Album (2013)

=== Singles ===
Year	Title	UK	US	AUS	NZ	NL	Label catalogue ref
1977	"Biding My Time" / "Stepping Stones" (as Badger)	–	–	–	–	–	MCA 293
1977	"Night of Love" / "Don't Wanna Wait Too Long" (as Badger)	–	–	–	–	–	MCA 318
1979	"The Shape of Things to Come" / "The Mood I'm in"	45	67	89	–	17	RSO 40 – 2090386
1979	"Stepping Stones" / "Before Tonight"	–	–	–	–	–	RSO 49 – 2090404
1979	"Schoolgirls/ Stepping Stones + Double Vision"	–	–	–	–	18	RSO Holland 2252134
1980	"Kickin' the Kans" / "Double Vision + My Favourite DJ"	–	–	–	44	–	RSO 56 – 2090430
1980	"Something's Happening" / "Writing on the Wall"	–	–	–	–	–	Polydor 2040366

== See also ==
- Video Concert Hall
