= Let's Change the World with Music =

Studio album by Prefab Sprout
- Released: 7 September 2009
- Recorded: 1992–2008
- Genre: Pop
- Label: Kitchenware
- Producer: Paddy McAloon

Prefab Sprout chronology
| I Trawl the Megahertz (2003) | Let's Change the World with Music (2009) | Crimson/Red (2013) |

Let's Change the World with Music is the ninth studio album by the English pop group Prefab Sprout. It was released on 7 September 2009 by Kitchenware Records. It was the band's first album of new material since 2001's The Gunman and Other Stories (excluding 2003's I Trawl the Megahertz, which at the time was considered to be a solo album by group leader Paddy McAloon) and marked a return to Sony Music, Kitchenware's parent label. The album reached No. 39 in the UK Albums Chart at the end of the week of its release. Although no singles were technically released, "Let There Be Music" was sent to radio stations, and "Sweet Gospel Music" was due to be a one-track digital release to highlight the album, but received no airplay and therefore was pulled.

== Background ==
The album title was known among the band's fans as being one of the "lost" albums recorded in demo form in 1992 by Paddy McAloon. The album was originally intended to be the successor to 1990's Jordan: The Comeback and was to have been produced by Thomas Dolby.

In an interview with Craig McLean of The Independent, McAloon observed that the prime mover behind the album was his longtime manager, Keith Armstrong. McAloon stated that "Keith was trying to help me, to make some money. When I finish something I listen to it intensively for a short period, then never look at it again. And I'm not really that interested. But when I heard this I thought, 'Oh boy, this is good.'"

During a September 2009 interview on BBC Radio 2's Radcliffe & Maconie, McAloon explained that in 1993, during a meeting with Sony, he presented a tape of about 14 songs as the follow-up to the lengthy Jordan: The Comeback. Apparently, there were too many people in the room and the meeting did not go well. Although Sony A&R man Muff Winwood wanted him to trim the record down to a more manageable length, there was a misunderstanding, and McAloon believed that Sony wanted him to expand on just one or two of the ideas (rather than just trim one or two of the songs from the album). He then went away for a year and a half and developed one of the three-minute songs into a 30-song piece of music. He eventually realised that this was not what Sony wanted, but by this point, it was too late.

The album was written, performed and produced by McAloon at his own Andromeda Heights Studio in County Durham around 1993. It was then mixed in Scotland by longtime engineer Calum Malcolm. None of the other band members appear, although McAloon dedicated the album to them.

McAloon wrote two versions of the title track. One was based around the idea of a duet with Barbra Streisand. The phrase "Let's Change the World with Music" is the first line of the chorus. However, neither version of the track was included on the album. Several titles were previously recorded by other artists, including Australian singer Wendy Matthews on her album The Witness Tree ("Ride", "God Watch Over You"). "God Watch Over You" was also recorded by British theatrical star Frances Ruffelle on her debut album, Fragile. The release was also accompanied by several promotional interviews, including The Sunday Times and Mojo.

The album reached No. 39 in the UK Albums Chart at the end of the week of its release. It was released on the same day as a number of the Beatles' reissues, which occupied 11 of the chart places above it.

== Critical reception ==
Professional ratings
Review scores
| Source | Rating |
|---|---|
| AllMusic | 4/5 stars |
| BBC | (positive) |
| Independent | (positive) |
| The Guardian | 4/5 stars |
| Spin | 8/10 stars |
| The Times | 5/5 stars |

Initial reviews in the press were very favourable. In The Times, Dan Cairns described it as a "heartbreakingly good record" and gave it 5 out of 5. Dave Simpson of The Guardian gave it 4 out of 5 and called it an "aural treat" which showed McAloon "at the top of his game". The review in The Independent was positive, describing the album as "lyrical and lush". It was also given 4 out of 5 in Record Collector and Observer Music Monthly. The latter described the album as "fantastically dated" because of the 17-year delay in release. However, it also called it "fantastically glorious" and an "enchanting return".

== Track listing ==
All songs written by Paddy McAloon.

1. "Let There Be Music"
2. "Ride"
3. "I Love Music"
4. "God Watch Over You"
5. "Music Is a Princess"
6. "Earth: The Story So Far"
7. "Last of the Great Romantics"
8. "Falling in Love"
9. "Sweet Gospel Music"
10. "Meet the New Mozart"
11. "Angel of Love"
