= I Trawl the Megahertz =

Studio album by Paddy McAloon
- Released: 27 May 2003
- Recorded: 1999–2002
- Genre: Classical; ambient; chamber pop
- Length: 52:29
- Label: Liberty Records
- Producer: Paddy McAloon, Calum Malcolm

Paddy McAloon chronology
The Gunman and Other Stories (2001)	I Trawl the Megahertz (2003)	Let's Change the World with Music (2009)

Prefab Sprout reissue cover art

I Trawl the Megahertz is an album originally released as a Paddy McAloon solo album in May 2003 on Liberty Records. It was later reissued in February 2019 on Sony Music under the Prefab Sprout name, as originally intended, with new artwork, and retroactively considered the eighth Prefab Sprout album.

McAloon was rendered nearly blind for a period in 1999 due to detached retinas; housebound, he found comfort in listening to shortwave radio transmissions like chat shows, phone-in programs and documentaries. He recorded conversations from these programs, fragmented them, and introduced new words and lines from other sources, generating source material for the album.

The largely instrumental album marks a notable stylistic change from previous Prefab Sprout work, featuring classical passages and orchestration reminiscent of Claude Debussy and Maurice Ravel, McAloon's two favourite composers. Writing much of the music on his computer, McAloon was given help by co-producer Calum Malcolm and composer David McGuinness in translating his original versions into the final recordings, with live orchestration provided by Mr McFall's Chamber. McAloon's radio-sourced material was then integrated with the songs, with spoken word vocals from Yvonne Connors on the title track, TV and radio dialogue samples on "I'm 49" and McAloon's own singing on "Sleeping Rough".

With themes of old memories and time passing, I Trawl the Megahertz is a highly personal work, dominated by its poignant title track, in which Connors intones "the story of her life", largely created by excerpts of radio conversation, over an orchestral motif. Despite concerns the album would alienate fans, I Trawl the Megahertz was belatedly released to positive critical reception, with many finding the album powerful and poignant. In the year end polls for 2003's albums of the year it featured at number 22 in Uncut Magazine and number 50 in Mojo, who later included the album in their 2005 list of the top 50 'most out there' albums. The magazine would later describe I Trawl the Megahertz as an "unlikely orch-pop masterpiece."

== Genesis and concept ==
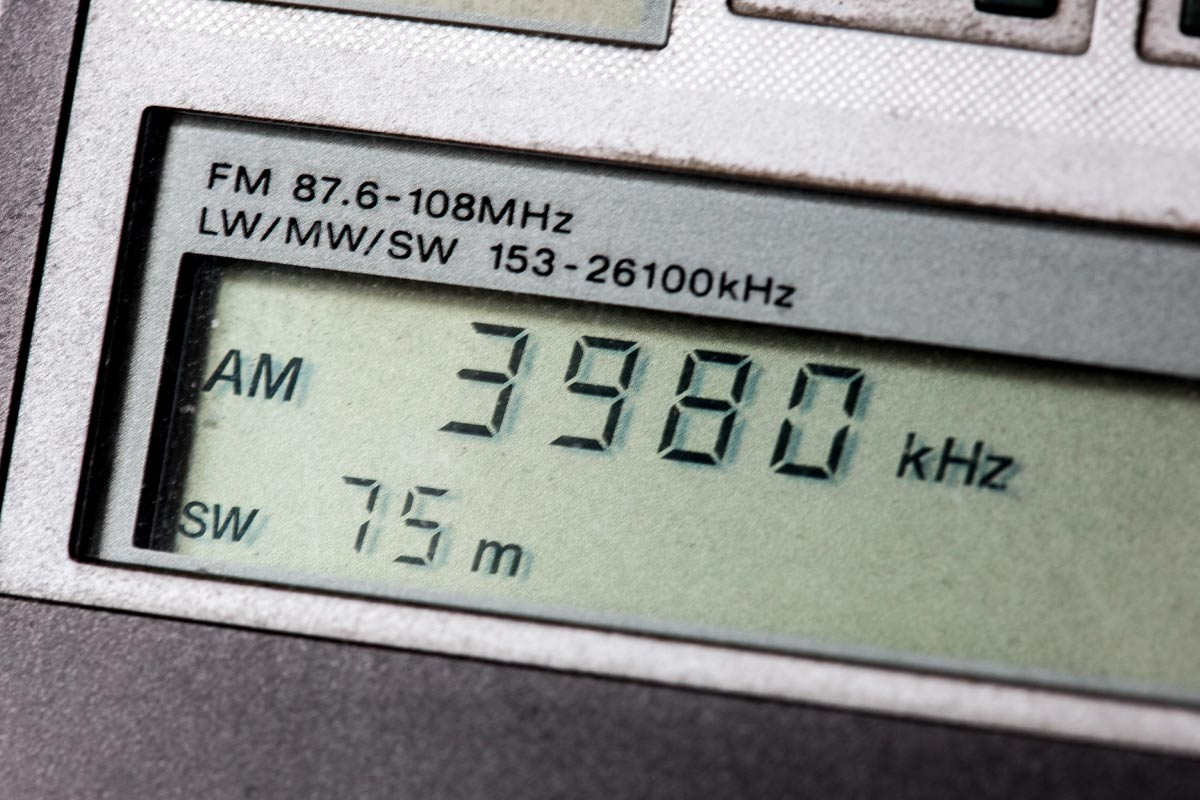
Paddy McAloon listened to short wave radio programs and sampled them for the album.

In 1999, Paddy McAloon, front man of British pop band Prefab Sprout, suffered detachment from both retinas in his eyes in quick succession, possibly due to congenital factors, which needed extensive surgery and left him nearly blind for some time. As such, he was left housebound, and rendered unable to write songs in his usual fashion, namely "hunched over a keyboard," and he found it particularly frustrating as he found himself subject "to itchy, unpleasant withdrawal symptoms if [he] cannot work." As a result of this, and being unable to read, McAloon passed the time by listening to, and recording, various television and radio programs, especially chat shows, phone-in radio shows, citizens band conversations and "military encryptions – you name it, I was eavesdropping on it." Much of his listening was to late night radio shows, in particular short wave radio transmissions.

McAloon found solace in various shows and documentaries transmitted over radio. Inspired by what he heard, he used raw material from these radio programs as source material for a new solo album, I Trawl the Megahertz. He began taping the programs he listened to: "chat shows and things like that, people phoning in with their complaints to various DJs." By his own admission, he found 90% of what he recorded "boring", but began to "mentally edit" some of the things he heard: "Odd words from documentaries would cross-pollinate with melancholy confidences aired on late night phone-ins; phrases that originated in different time zones on different frequencies would team up to make new and oddly affecting sentences. And I would change details to protect the innocent (or guilty), to streamline the story that I could hear emerging, and to make it all more ... musical, I suppose."

== Writing and recording ==
Using the radio recordings he made, and developing on his "mental edits", he sequenced the various complaints he heard on radio shows and crossed them with things he heard on documentaries—sometimes specific words like "anesthetic" or "ether"—and used them as the starting point of the album. After gathering enough sampled, fragmented conversation, he found he would not be able to "finish the thought" by listening to the rest of the transmissions, and instead "finished off the ideas" by adding in a lot of the details himself. He later claimed he made up a lot of the quotations used in the title track himself, having been unable to find the right words on the radio that he needed.

He wrote and shaped the entirety of the album's music on a computer, with the album's existence becoming the most dependent on technology in McAloon's whole career; McAloon later noted "without [technology] I simply have no means of road-testing certain ideas." He spent a long period of time working on the music on the album, particularly the title track, as "just as a computer piece, using the same old rubbishy synth sounds." Collaborators including co-producer Calum Malcolm and composer David McGuinness aided McAloon, helping to bridge the gap between McAloon's original MIDI versions of the tracks and their final recordings, which incorporate live strings recorded by Mr McFall's Chamber, a classical crossover ensemble. McAloon thanks Malcolm and McGuinness in the liner notes "for helping to translate my illiterate ideas into scores that professional musicians could read without laughing." The voice on the title track is that of an American commodities broker based in London, Yvonne Connors, who recorded her contribution between 6.15pm and 8.45pm in room 551 of The Royal Garden Hotel, Kensington, London, on October 25, 1999. McAloon chose her for the song because he felt his own voice would not suit the song; "I'm making a Prefab Sprout record which I can bear to listen to because it's not me singing."

== Music ==
I Trawl the Megahertz is a heavily orchestrated and largely instrumental work, documenting "a personal journey with grace and feeling". Washes of orchestration that have been compared to Leonard Bernstein and passages said to evoke Claude Debussy and Maurice Ravel, McAloon's favourite composers, are coupled "with words of intelligence and desperate sadness." The usage of strings and "a mournful horn section" helps distance the album from the plaintive melodies and witty wordplay of Prefab Sprout's music. The Scotsman even described the album as "less an album than a largely-instrumental suite." The tracks feature an array of voices representing those McAloon heard on the radio, mostly during phone-in radio conversations, "swimming in and out of earshot as the dial spins through the frequencies." Entertainment.ie felt the weaving of fragments of radio show conversations into "a series of compelling narratives against a lushly orchestral background" defines the album's sound.

Many critics described the album as a very personal and poignant work with dark themes. Indeed, the album's original release under McAloon's name, as opposed to Prefab Sprout, was due to the album's highly personal content and uncharacteristic sound. At the time, McAloon felt that if he were to release it under the Prefab Sprout name, fans would be disappointed to find a lack of single material. At the centre of the album are themes of time passing and the revisitation of old memories.

=== Title track ===
"Yvonne Connors speaks matter-of-factly–yet dramatically enough to be poignant–as she rifles through fragments of her memory."

— Andy Kellman of AllMusic.

The album is dominated by its symphonic, 22-minute opening track, "I Trawl the Megahertz," which gives the album its name. Featuring a recurring motif played by swaying, lush string arrangement, as well as "weeping" trumpet, the song takes on "an almost dream-like state." Throughout the track, Yvonne Connors, speaking in a soft spoken word voice, intones poetry regarding "the story of [her] life." She follows her introduction with a splicing together and anecdotes and stories inspired by the aforementioned late night radio talk shows, mostly taken from phone-ins and documentaries, which are displayed as fragments of the narrator's memory. "Once contextualized this becomes a deeply moving autobiographical ode to isolation, loss and heartache," according to Chris Jones of the BBC, "it's as if McAloon's well-proven gift for aching melody and erudite love songs has, due to his enforced immobility, been subsumed into a purer and more abstract medium." The lines veer "from heartbreaking sadness to contemplations on time passed," according to Guy Collier of The Digital Fix, McAloon compared the song to a short film.

Connors's narration is heartfelt, yet off-hand, and is as "bitter as all the best tales of loss," according to The Independent. The line "I said your daddy loves you, I said your daddy loves you very much. He just doesn't want to live with us anymore" was often singled out by reviewers for its disarming poignancy. MusicOMH compared the song to "a less cynical Black Box Recorder." McAloon was concerned about finding the correct narrator, saying "I wanted to make a record I could listen to, so it couldn't be me singing, because I can't stand my voice." He later told The Scotsman, "It has a woman speaking and it sounds like she's speaking about her voice. I loved that distance." McAloon explained the title song was 22 minutes long because it is "the length you'll get on an Atari [ST computer]." He later felt it was a poor reason, "but in the end when I figured out the structure of it it was just gonna fall within what an Atari could do." He later explained the length of the song to watching a film:

"It should probably have been shorter, I know that, that opening track. On the other hand I thought it's a little bit like going to see a film. You wouldn't want to do it all the time, you wouldn't want to see the same film all the time, but while you're there you'll give it your attention and you won't think in the middle of it you'll go and do something else. You'll watch the film and then you put it away. That was my idea with Megahertz. So I knew at the outset that it might have a limited appeal to people, because nowadays you can't give them more than a couple of minutes in one song."

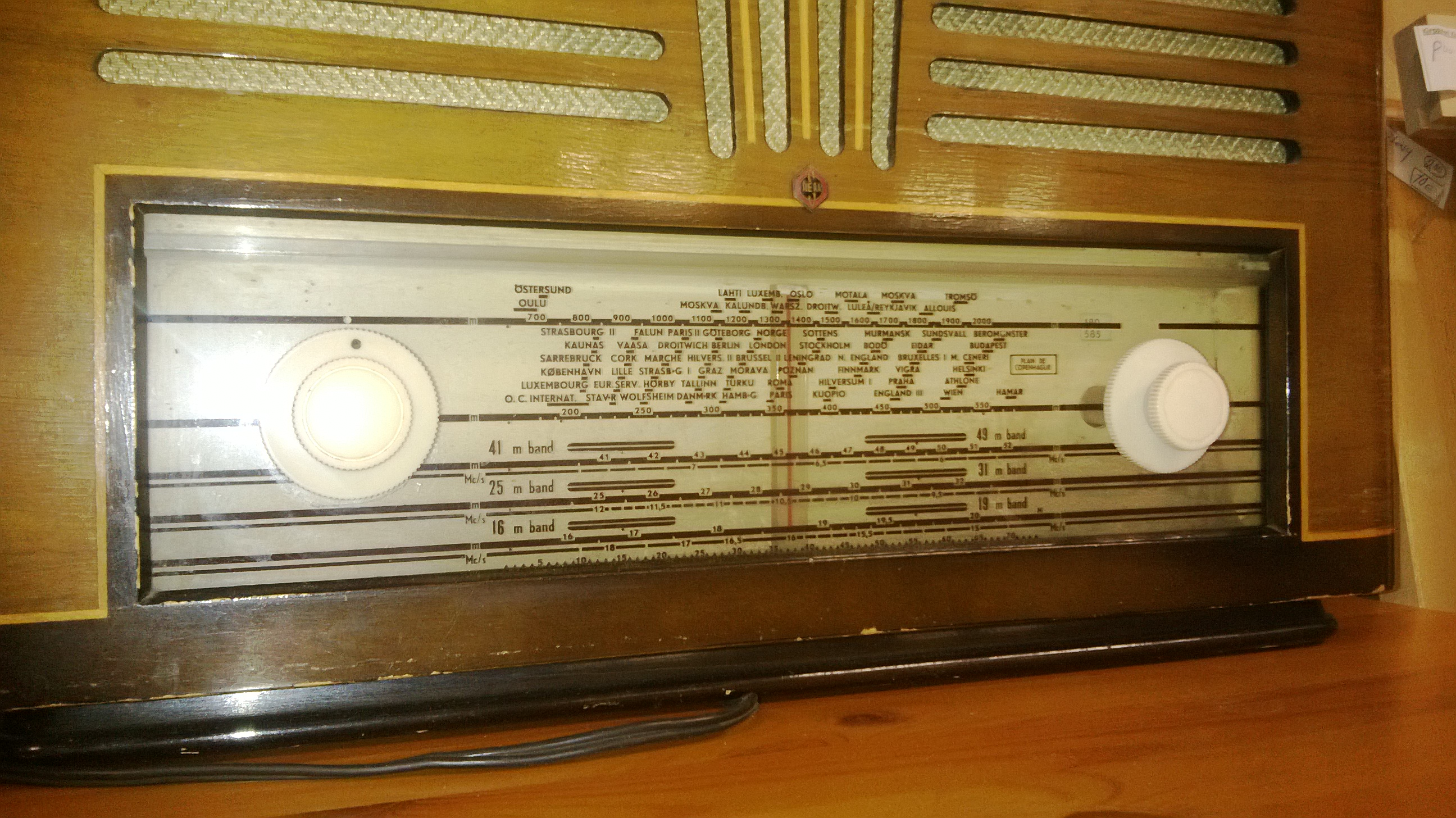
The change between fragmented conversations on the album gives the illusion of someone "with their hand on a radio dial."

In the album's liner notes, McAloon said the song "seems to be a portrait of a woman who is trying to make sense of her life by reviewing selected memories. She is like someone with their hand on a radio dial, turning into distant stations, listening to fragments of different broadcasts. I say 'seems to' because a degree of vagueness suits my purpose and reflects the tentative way in which 'Megahertz' was written."

=== Tracks 2–9 ===
The eight remaining tracks are mostly instrumental, described by one reviewer as reminiscent of "a soundtrack for an imaginary film." The pace remains consistent, with the string section "threatening to become overpowerful" in the album's later tracks. Snippets of radio phone-in voices and war reporting appear on some tracks. According to one reviewer, these snippets are among those "trying to make sense of age and time" in keeping in with the album's theme. The instrumentals include "We Were Poor..." and its companion piece "...But We Were Happy," which are lushly orchestrated reiterations of the album's main theme, the jazzy vamp of "Fall from Grace", and "Esprit De Corps", a technical exercise that has been compared to Frank Zappa.

"I'm 49", meanwhile, is a discourse on a near-breakdown which features the album's underlying theme of loneliness and separation with lines like "What's wrong? I'm 49 and I'm divorced," containing samples from McAloon's exploration of radio transmissions. Chris Jones felt the song served as one of the album's several reminders that "you are never far from the sadness and regret that suffuses the mind of the composer." The autumnal "Sleeping Rough" is the only song to contain McAloon's singing. He mournfully croons on the sad song, exuding a somewhat sad but generally content view on coming to grips with age, with lyrics like "I'll grow a long and silver beard and let it reach my knees." Andy Kellman of AllMusic felt the song was "almost as emblematic of the album" as its title track. The Independent felt that, "even now, though, he's racked about it all, convinced there's so much wrong."

== Release ==
Given I Trawl the Megahertz's unusual content, McAloon suspected the album would be "too unusual for a major label to release," although the album was ultimately released by EMI-owned label Liberty Records, the same label that Prefab Sprout were signed to at the time, on 27 May 2003, almost five years after the songs on the album were written, and by which point McAloon had completed the lyrics for the next Prefab Sprout album, and whose eyesight had largely improved thanks to the extensive surgery. Critics speculated that the album would confuse longtime McAloon fans; Kellman felt the album was "as likely to perplex and infuriate as it is likely to stun and spellbind," whereas Jones felt, despite Prefab Sprout's increasing eccentricity over time, "nothing will have prepared [McAloon's] fans for this."

On November 8, 2018, Rough Trade Records announced pre-order for a new remastered edition of the album on limited edition white vinyl double album, in a standard black edition, and in CD and digital download formats. The double vinyl album comprises one side with the full title track, one side of "etched vinyl", and the remaining tracks split across the second disk. For this release, I Trawl the Megahertz was reclassified as a Prefab Sprout album.

== Critical reception ==
Professional ratings
Review scores
Source	Rating
AllMusic	4/5 stars
Entertainment.ie	4/5 stars
Pitchfork	8.5/10

Critical reception concentrated on the stylistic change of I Trawl the Megahertz compared to his earlier work. However, reviewers were universally favourable. Chris Jones of the BBC called the album "gorgeous" and "a work of troubling beauty," speculating that "such a deeply personal project will probably never recapture those people that bought Steve McQueen the first time around. But for all of us at a particular stage in life this is a poignant reminder of the healing power of music. One can only hope that it worked for McAloon himself." Andy Kellman of AllMusic made the record an "Album Pick", rating it four stars out of five and saying "the record is incredibly powerful -- almost too powerful -- even when held up against everything from Prefab Sprout's past." While noting the album was written when McAloon temporarily lost his eyesight, "it's plain to hear that his vision remains."

Describing the album as "the result" of McAloon's "late night experiments" with radio recording, Entertainment.ie rated the album four stars out of five, calling the record "an exceptional work from an exceptional talent" that, while bordering "on the self-indulgent at times, much of the material is absolutely fascinating - despite, or perhaps because of the fact that it's been taken completely out of its original context." The reviewer cited the album's title track as the highlight, "a 22-minute tale of loss narrated by an American female vocalist that builds into an unbearably moving symphony of sadness." John Murphy of musicOMH, said that I Trawl The Megahertz "won't be to everyone's taste – in fact you get the feeling that most people will probably be a bit baffled by the whole thing. However anyone looking for intelligent, rewarding listening can't go far wrong with this – it's good to have McAloon back." He also highlighted the title track, saying "it should be a mess, but it works beautifully."

The Independent hailed the "extraordinary" album, calling it "unspeakably poignant," while a reviewer for The Scotsman wrote: "Encroaching blindness, seclusion, the loneliness of the short-wave aficionado - I can't think when I last heard a sadder record." During an interview with McAloon, one writer wrote how the album was a contemporary classical experiment that "really worked." Guy Collier of The Digital Fix "highly recommended the album," asking for listeners to allow themselves "time to listen to what's being said though and anyone who has contemplated his or her own life can't fail to be ensnared by the timeless grace of it all." In their year end polls for the best albums of 2003, Uncut ranked the album at number 22, while Mojo ranked the album at number 50. in 2005, Mojo included I Trawl the Megahertz in their list of "Top 50 'Most Out There' Albums", and in 2014, they ranked the album at number 50 in their list of "The 50 Weirdest Albums Ever," quipping: "Steve McQueen, we hardly knew you." The magazine also called the album an "unlikely orch-pop masterpiece."

== Track listing ==
All songs written by Paddy McAloon.

1. "I Trawl the Megahertz" – 22:06
2. "Esprit de corps" – 4:51
3. "Fall from Grace" – 3:38
4. "We Were Poor..." – 4:49
5. "Orchid 7" – 4:20
6. "I'm 49" – 3:48
7. "Sleeping Rough" – 3:34
8. "Ineffable" – 2:42
9. "...But We Were Happy" – 3:48

== Personnel ==
Credits adapted from liner notes.

- Paddy McAloon – writing, lyrics, music, production
- David McGuinness – arrangements
- Gerard Presencer – brass, flugelhorn, trumpet, woodwind
- Robert Irvine – cello
- Julian Argüelles – clarinet, saxophone
- Rick Standley – double bass
- Johann Sebastian Barcode – keyboards, programming
- Calum Malcolm – mixing, recording, producer
- Corky Anderson – percussion
- The Robert McFall Orchestra – strings
- Brian Schiele – viola
- Greg Lawson – violin
- Robert McFall – violin
- Yvonne Connors – vocals (on track one)

== Charts ==
Chart (2019)	Peak position
Scottish Albums (OCC)	16
UK Albums (OCC)	54
