= Steve Adey =

English musician, singer-songwriter

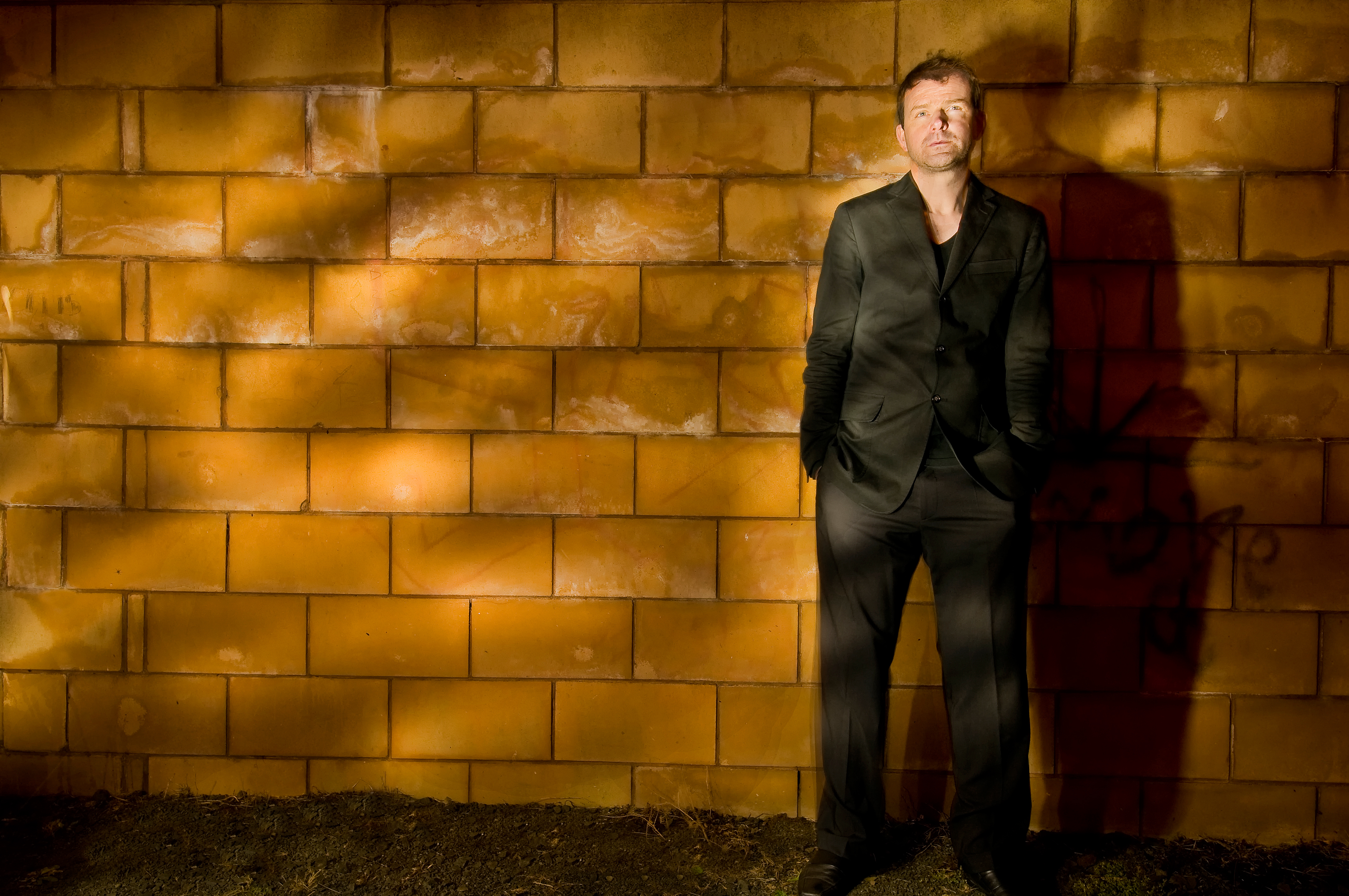
- Promo image for The Tower of Silence LP

Background information
- Origin: Birmingham, England
- Genres: Alternative rock, art rock, avant-garde, experimental rock, folk, baroque pop
- Years active: 2006–present
- Label: Grand Harmonium
- Website: steveadey.com

Steve Adey (born in Great Barr, Birmingham) is an English musician and singer-songwriter. His music is characterised by slow tempos, minimalist arrangements, underpinned by piano and a rich baritone vocal. As of 2018 Adey has released three studio albums and various EPs and singles.

Adey released his critically well received debut album All Things Real in 2006 through independent record label Grand Harmonium Records. Music journalists often categorise his piano, vocal led songs as folk and singer-songwriter, but also acknowledge a harder, less generic, left of mainstream approach; No Ripcord's Simon Briercliffe writes "His voice is rich and carries on long after it's comfortable, at times far louder and more in your ear than is comfortable, leaving you hanging on every word." Writers generally warmed to the album's introspective songs and well chosen covers. US journal for improvised and progressive music 'Signal to Noise' heralded the album as "haunting folk into straight-up epic territory." Many reviews picked up on the integration of hi-fidelity crossed with a lo fi, homemade approach. Sunday Times critic Mark Edwards: "The secret lies in the gap between Adey’s main influences: on the one hand, the mournful, home-made alt-country of Oldham and Smog; on the other, the pristine atmospheres of the Blue Nile and Talk Talk." Critic Leon McDdermott (Glasgow Herald) writes "Adey channels the spirit of Smog, minus Bill Callahan's caustic take on dysfunctional relationships; elsewhere, there are hints of the late Jeff Buckley's mournful tenderness."

Grand Harmonium released lead single "Find the Way" (31.06.06), containing two new acoustic recordings of "Find the Way" and "Mississippi". Mississippi: Remixed, a download only EP, featuring Kramer, A Marble Calm, Black Sheep and Sweet Billy Pilgrim was released (14.05.07). The Marble Calm remix was also released on 12" vinyl via Tonefloat Records. A limited 7" single and download, "Burning Fields" b/w "Everything in its Right Place" followed in September 2007.

Adey (with full band) played several festivals around Europe in 2007, and in August 2007 headlined his debut UK tour.

In 2010, a new Steve Adey track (excerpt) was featured in an advert for Mercedes-Benz.

A five-song EP entitled These Resurrections was released in May 2011.

A new studio "long player" The Tower of Silence was released in November 2012 to positive critical response. The Tower of Silence made The Sunday Times Album of the Week and Q Magazine cited the album as "beautiful and grandly". MusicOMH garnered the album "a meticulously crafted, sparse and funereally paced soundscape on which every note seems to have to earn its place; an eerie, sweeping soundtrack of grand orchestration."

A new album of covers entitled "Do Me a Kindness" was released on 4 August 2017. The album includes takes on David Bowie, Nick Cave, Bob Dylan, PJ Harvey and more.

== History ==
=== 2003–2006: All Things Real ===
All Things Real was recorded between September 2003 and April 2005, at Longformacus Parish Church, and a rented cottage in Longformacus, Scottish Borders. The recording was "fixed" and mastered by Calum Malcolm. The album consists of both original compositions and cover versions of Bob Dylan's "Shelter from the Storm" and Will Oldham's "I See a Darkness".

All Things Real was critically well received. Sunday Times journalist Mark Edwards on Shelter from the Storm: "You'd have to be a fool to cover one of Dylan's best-loved songs. Either that, or a singer with the presence — and presence of mind — to slow it right down, exposing the beauty of every syllable."

Ian Mathers from Stylus Magazine: "Never has Dylan's 'creature void of form' sounded so wracked, so stricken".

The album includes the song "Mary Margaret O'Hara", a tribute to the Canadian singer/actress Mary Margaret O'Hara. An initial album recording, featuring choral singers and members of the Royal Scottish National Orchestra was abandoned, due to the wrong feel and a less personal sound.

=== 2012: The Tower of Silence ===
It was announced via Steve's official website over the summer of 2012 that a new album will be available from September as a special LP bundle direct from the artist. An official release was to follow in November through the Grand Harmonium label. Adey worked on The Tower of Silence for several years, mostly mixing and editing early band recordings that were "laid down" in a church. No computers were used and Adey wanted to mix to tape in "an old school" style. "The songs were all written at the piano, but from that point, the direction and possible trajectory could be anything." Each song was approached differently, although the overall sound of the album is seamless and has a continuous mood. A full string section was employed during the initial recording. The sound is more "live" with more emphasis on a stronger "band feel." Album two was recorded, for the most part in a church, using the natural acoustic and room noise.
The album received critical acclaim across the board, including positive reviews from The Sunday Times, Q Magazine and Uncut Magazine, who also included the track "Laughing" on a best of 2012 covermount CD.

== Influences ==
Writers consistently reference Smog, the Blue Nile and Talk Talk as influences.
In various interviews, Adey has said that the Bonnie Prince Billy, a.k.a. Will Oldham albums I See a Darkness and Master and Everyone are very important and influential records. Also, Oldham's 'I See a Darkness' was covered on All Things Real. Uncut magazine cited that "Adey is clearly in thrall to the folk fatalism of Will "Bonnie Prince Billy" Oldham along with Dylan and the knotty American pre-war minstrels that inspired him." Talk Talk lead man Mark Hollis is a major influence. Hollis released his only solo, eponymous album in 1997. Adey commented the album was "Uncompromising and in a different league."

== Recording ==
Adey has previously engineered and mastered recordings for classical labels, recorded various types of music from heavy rock to folk, both in the US where he lived for several years, and his current home city of Edinburgh. He has recorded and self-produced both solo albums All Things Real and The Tower of Silence.

== Discography ==
- All Things Real (2006)
- The Tower of Silence (2012)
- Do Me a Kindness (2017)
