= The Tower of Silence (novel) =

2013 novel by Phiroshaw Jamsetjee Chevalier

- Cover of the first edition
- Author: Phiroshaw Jamsetjee Chevalier
- Language: English
- Publisher: HarperCollins
- Publication date: 2013
- Publication place: United Kingdom
- Media type: Print (Paperback)
- Pages: 220pp (first edition, pb)
- ISBN: 9789350296370

The Tower of Silence is a novel by Indian author Phiroshaw Jamsetjee Chevalier, allegedly written in 1927 and recovered from a lost manuscript by historian Gyan Prakash. It was first published in complete form by HarperCollins in 2013.

== Plot ==
An aerial photographer takes a photograph of a Parsi dakhma, also known as a tower of silence, a structure used to expose the bodies of the dead to carrion birds. This is deeply offensive to the Parsi population of Mumbai, and one of their number sets out to exact revenge for this insult. British detective Sexton Blake matches wits with him, and the two are soon engaged in a cat and mouse game across the city.

== Background ==
The events of The Tower of Silence are based upon a real life incident: in August 1923 the British illustrated newspaper The Graphic printed an aerial photograph of a dakhma in Pune, taken from an angle that displayed the corpses inside. The photograph caused such outrage that the Secretary of State for India requested that the editor of The Graphic destroy both the photographic plate and negative.

Gyan Prakash, a professor of history at Princeton University, came across a portion of the manuscript for The Tower of Silence in the British Library while conducting research in 2001. Having read the first half of the novel, and unable to find any information about the author, Phiroshaw Jamsetjee Chevalier, he began a search for the rest of the text. Despite the book never having been published, Prakash was able to locate a complete version of the manuscript in the Secretariat Library in Mumbai three years later.

Mark Hodder, an expert of Sexton Blake, doubts Prakash's claim.

== Reception ==
Much of the coverage of the release of The Tower of Silence focussed on the unique nature of its discovery and publication. In relation to the novel itself, Mumbai Boss stated that it was only an average detective story, but that "it keeps you hooked thanks to the fantastically quirky character that is Beram and the way the book captures the sentiment of the Parsi community at the time."
