= Andromeda Heights =

Studio album by Prefab Sprout
- Released: 2 May 1997
- Genre: Pop
- Length: 47:02
- Label: Kitchenware
- Producer: Paddy McAloon

Prefab Sprout chronology
A Life of Surprises: The Best of Prefab Sprout (1992)	Andromeda Heights (1997)	38 Carat Collection (1999)

Singles from Andromeda Heights
- 1. "A Prisoner of the Past" Released: April 1997; 2. "Electric Guitars" Released: July 1997

Professional ratings
Review scores
Source	Rating
AllMusic	3/5 stars
NME	7/10
Uncut	4/5 stars

Andromeda Heights is the sixth studio album by the English pop group Prefab Sprout. It was released by Kitchenware Records on 2 May 1997. It peaked at number 7 in the UK Albums Chart. "A Prisoner of the Past" and "Electric Guitars" were also released as singles, peaking at number 30 and number 53, respectively, in the UK singles chart.

The high-tech recording studio that Paddy McAloon built for himself at his home in County Durham is also called Andromeda Heights.

== Critical reception ==
Stephen Thomas Erlewine of AllMusic stated that "the album doesn't quite fulfill the hopes of the group's fervent followers." He added, "Andromeda Heights is a solid Prefab Sprout record, filled with elegant melodies, wry lyrics and immaculate production, but after seven years, that nevertheless ranks as a disappointment."

== Track listing ==
All tracks are written by Paddy McAloon.

No.	Title	Length
1.	"Electric Guitars"	3:41
2.	"A Prisoner of the Past"	5:01
3.	"The Mystery of Love"	4:37
4.	"Life's a Miracle"	3:44
5.	"Anne Marie"	4:35
6.	"Whoever You Are"	2:47
7.	"Steal Your Thunder"	3:41
8.	"Avenue of Stars"	3:59
9.	"Swans"	2:36
10.	"The Fifth Horseman"	4:42
11.	"Weightless"	3:36
12.	"Andromeda Heights"	4:03
Total length:		47:02

Japanese edition bonus track
No.	Title	Length
13.	"Just Because I Can"	3:52
Total length:		51:04

== Personnel ==
Credits adapted from liner notes.

Musicians

(billed as "The Andromeda Heights Orchestra")

- Paddy McAloon – vocals, piano, keyboards, programming, "fake mandolin" & acoustic guitar (on "A Prisoner of the Past")
- Wendy Smith – vocals
- Martin McAloon – bass guitar, fretless bass guitar
- David Brewis – guitars, "fake mandolin" & acoustic guitar (on "A Prisoner of the Past")
- Paul Smith – percussion
- Tommy Smith – tenor saxophone, soprano saxophone, flute
- Frazer Spiers – harmonica
- Jim Hornsby – "fake mandolin" & acoustic guitar (on "A Prisoner of the Past")
- Martin Taylor – lead guitar (on "Anne Marie"), rhythm guitar (on "Andromeda Heights")
- Calum Malcolm – piano, keyboards, programming; Hammond organ (on "The Fifth Horseman")
- Alan Clark – Hammond organ (on "The Mystery of Love")

Technical personnel

- Paddy McAloon – production
- Calum Malcolm – recording, mixing
- Stylorouge – sleeve design
- Stuart Douglas – sleeve photography
- Anne Magill – cover painting

== Charts ==
Chart	Peak position
UK Albums (OCC)	7
