= The Tower of Silence (album) =

Studio album by Steve Adey
- Released: 26 November 2012
- Recorded: 2007–2012
- Genre: Alternative rock, baroque pop
- Length: 33.55
- Label: Grand Harmonium
- Producer: Steve Adey

Steve Adey chronology
All Things Real (2006)	The Tower of Silence (2012)

Singles from The Tower of Silence
- 1. "Laughing" Released: 19 November 2012

Professional ratings
Review scores
Source	Rating
The Sunday Times	5/5 stars
Uncut	(8/10)
Q	()

The Tower of Silence is the second studio album by Steve Adey. The album was released in the UK by Grand Harmonium on 26 November 2012.

== Production ==
It was announced via Steve's official website over the summer of 2012 that a new album will be available from September as a special LP bundle direct from the artist. An official release was to follow in November through the Grand Harmonium label. The album was recorded in Edinburgh, Scotland, in Adey's recording studio (a church). A full string section was employed during the initial recording. The sound is more "live" with more emphasis on a stronger "band feel." The album was recorded over five years and when asked why the delay? Adey commented "The album mutates to the point where you become a passenger; an observer – the more you get immersed in the recording process the less control you have over the duration and possible trajectory."

== Artwork ==
The album cover art is an illustration of a whale suspended by balloons and parachutes. The theme continues throughout the LP/CD booklet. Matt Canning contributed all illustrations for the album's artwork and worked with Adey to integrate the visuals and soundscapes.

== Reception ==
The Tower of Silence received critical acclaim including The Sunday Times 'Album of the Week' and Q magazine cited the album as "beautiful and grandly." MusicOMH called the album "a meticulously crafted, sparse and funereally paced soundscape on which every note seems to have to earn its place; an eerie, sweeping soundtrack of grand orchestration." Uncut gave the album 8/10; "Highlights are the wintery 'Just Wait Till I Get You Home' and a cover of Alasdair Roberts' maudlin ballad 'Farewell Sorrow', which Adey renders as a tremulous reply to Will Oldham's 'I See a Darkness.' With added darkness." Mojo's Andy Cowen writes "There's a breathtaking sonic purity to Adey's second album. Stripped down to the barest of bones, the songwriters heartfelt paeans, delivered in his beautifully rich baritone, are up there with the best of Bill Callahan and Bonnie 'Prince' Billy."

== Track listing ==
All songs written by Steve Adey except where noted.

1. "A Few Seconds Have Passed"
2. "Laughing"
3. "Just Wait Till I Get You Home"
4. "Army of One"
5. "With Tongues"
6. "Secret Place"
7. "Farewell Sorrow" (Alasdair Roberts)
8. "The Field"
9. "Dita Parlo"
10. "Tomorrow"

== Personnel ==
- Steve Adey – voice, piano, harmonium, melotron, Roland Jupiter 8, additional drums, bass pedals, percussion
- Helena MacGilp – voice
- Doug MacDonald – electric guitars
- Ismael Florit – harmonium, bass, acoustic guitars
- Recorded and produced by Steve Adey
