= Calum Malcolm =

Scottish record producer and keyboardist

Calum Malcolm is a Scottish record producer, sound engineer and keyboardist, who is based in Edinburgh, Scotland.

== Career ==
From 1974, he has worked with bands and musicians such as The Blue Nile, Capercaillie, Clannad, Emily Barker, Fish, The Go-Betweens, Hue and Cry, Maire Brennan, Nazareth, Orange Juice, Aztec Camera, The Fire Engines, Mark Knopfler, Prefab Sprout, Runrig, Steve Adey, Kris Drever, The Silencers, Simple Minds and Wet Wet Wet; whilst Barb Jungr, Claire Martin, the Scottish Chamber Orchestra, Royal Scottish National Orchestra, Mimori Yusa and Carol Kidd are others whom Malcolm has worked alongside in the recording studio.

He started his career in rock music with the band The Headboys in 1977.

His working credits also include The Boys of the Lough, Brian McNeill, It's Immaterial, Josef K, Mike Lindup, Stéphane Grappelli, The Happy Family, Tom Anderson, Tommy Smith, William Jackson and on Black's 2015 album, Blind Faith.

Malcolm "refurbished" Prefab Sprout's 2009 album, Let's Change the World with Music, and both mixed and produced their Crimson/Red album in 2013.
