= Cars and Girls =

Single by Prefab Sprout

from the album From Langley Park to Memphis
- B-side: "Vendetta"; "Nero the Zero" (12" single only)
- Released: February 1988
- Recorded: 1988
- Genre: New wave, indie pop
- Length: 4:27
- Label: Kitchenware
- Songwriter: Paddy McAloon
- Producer: Jon Kelly

Prefab Sprout singles chronology
"Johnny Johnny" (1986)	"Cars and Girls" (1988)	"The King of Rock 'n' Roll" (1988)

"Cars and Girls" is a single by English pop band Prefab Sprout, released by Kitchenware Records in February 1988. It was the first single taken from their album of that year, From Langley Park to Memphis. The single failed to reach the top 40 of the UK Singles Chart, reaching a peak of number 44 over five weeks on the chart. It has nevertheless become one of Prefab Sprout's most popular songs.

== Composition and recording ==
The song was written by Paddy McAloon in February 1985, after the completion of the Steve McQueen album the previous month. At the same time, McAloon wrote "The King of Rock 'n' Roll" which would also appear on From Langley Park to Memphis and would follow "Cars and Girls" as a single. The musically straightforward nature of these songs was, in McAloon's words, "a reaction in a way to the idea people have of my work being very precise and delicate. I thought, people are going to be surprised by this. How will they react to me having a bit of fun? Will they think it’s a bit like Julie Andrews taking her bra off in S.O.B.?". The song was first performed by Prefab Sprout in live appearances in 1985.

Lyrically, "Cars and Girls" is a comment on Bruce Springsteen's use of romantic metaphors in his songs. McAloon felt Springsteen utilised "a poetry that an Englishman can’t understand". The song is often seen as indicating a personal distaste for Springsteen, but McAloon elaborated on the lyrics in a 1992 interview; "The point of the parody is this: not that I think Bruce Springsteen is crap, it's that I think a lot of his audience get into him on a patriotic level that he doesn't intend. They misinterpret him, their enjoyment of him is inaccurate, all very imperialist American. I wanted to write a song about someone who was thick white trash, listening to Springsteen, and saying 'But our lives aren't like that'".

"Cars and Girls" is one of four tracks on From Langley Park to Memphis produced by Jon Kelly. Steve McQueen producer Thomas Dolby declined to produce the song as he felt any producer could do the job as well or better than him.

== Release ==
The band's first single for two years, "Cars and Girls" was released in February 1988, a month before the release of From Langley Park to Memphis. An effigy of Bruce Springsteen made of matches with its head on fire adorns the single sleeve. The single spent five weeks on the UK Singles Chart but failed to enter the top 40, reaching a peak of number 44. McAloon would describe himself as "shocked and stunned" at the song not being a hit, saying in a 1992 interview "I always liked that song. I thought it was really cute. I woke up then and I’ve never had such high expectations since". In August 1988, the band were reported to have persuaded CBS to rerelease the single but this did not come to pass.

Three new Prefab Sprout songs were released as B-sides for the "Cars and Girls" single, all recorded quickly in a Newcastle studio with minimal production. Two of the songs, "Vendetta" and "Nero the Zero", date to the band's early years. They are known to have been played live as early as 1980.

== Reception and legacy ==
Ian Dickson of Record Mirror praised the song as "one of the most commercially accessible Prefab Sprout singles to date" while the NME's Len Brown singled it out as a highlight of From Langley Park to Memphis. "Cars and Girls" has become one of Prefab Sprout's most well-known songs in spite of its disappointing chart performance. Despite the sentiments of the lyric, the song has been included on "driving rock" compilation albums such as Summer Cruisin' and Top Gear 2: 36 Classic Driving Tracks. The song was also included in the highly anticipated Grand Theft Auto VI Extended Look gameplay preview on Netflix.

== Track listings ==
=== 7" vinyl single ===
Side 1

1. "Cars and Girls"

Side 2

1. "Vendetta"

=== 10" vinyl single ===
Side 1

1. "Cars and Girls"

Side 2

1. "Real Life (Just Around The Corner)"
2. "Vendetta"

=== 12" vinyl single ===
Side 1

1. "Cars and Girls"

Side 2

1. "Vendetta"
2. "Nero the Zero"

=== CD single ===
1. "Cars and Girls"
2. "Faron Young (Truckin' Mix)"
3. "Real Life (Just Around The Corner)"
4. "Vendetta"

== Charts ==
Chart (1988)	Peak position
Australia (Kent Music Report)	41
France (IFOP)	83
Italy Airplay (Music & Media)	19
United Kingdom (Official Charts Company)	44
