= Prefab Sprout =

English pop band

- Prefab Sprout in 1988

Background information
- Origin: Witton Gilbert, County Durham, England
- Genres: Pop; sophisti-pop; jazz-pop; new wave; art rock
- Years active: 1978–present
- Labels: Kitchenware; EMI Liberty; Epic (US)
- Members: Paddy McAloon
- Past members: Martin McAloon; Michael Salmon; Wendy Smith; Feona Attwood; Graham Lant; Steve Dolder; Neil Conti

Prefab Sprout are an English pop/rock band from Witton Gilbert, County Durham who rose to fame during the 1980s. Formed in 1978 by brothers Paddy and Martin McAloon and joined by vocalist, guitarist and keyboard player Wendy Smith in 1982, they released their debut album Swoon to critical acclaim in 1984. Their subsequent albums, including 1985's Steve McQueen and 1990's Jordan: The Comeback, have been described by Paul Lester of The Guardian as "some of the most beautiful and intelligent records of their era". Frontman Paddy McAloon is regarded as one of the great songwriters of his time and the band have been credited with producing some of the "most beloved" pop music of the 1980s and 1990s.

Nine of their albums reached the top 40 on the UK Albums Chart and one of their singles, "The King of Rock 'n' Roll", peaked at number seven on the UK Singles Chart. The band's other popular songs include "When Love Breaks Down" and "Cars and Girls". The band have not played live since 2000. Starting from 2003, Paddy McAloon has retained the Prefab Sprout name as a solo project.

== Career ==
=== Early days (1977–1983) ===
In 1977, brothers Paddy and Martin McAloon formed the Dick Diver Band. By 1978, the name had changed to Prefab Sprout, a name McAloon had created years earlier when, as he has said, "all the groups had names like that". The band first played live in 1979, having been joined by drummer Michael Salmon.

The band recorded their first single "Lions in My Own Garden (Exit Someone)" b/w "Radio Love" on 25 February 1982, and self-released it on their own Candle Records (slogan: "The wax that won't get on your wick"). Songwriter Paddy McAloon wanted a song title where the first letters of the words spelled out Limoges, the French city where his former girlfriend was studying at the time. Music journalist Stuart Maconie described the track as "enigmatic, melancholy, tuneful and therefore perfect for a jobless literature graduate with girlfriend problems". Their lineup expanded shortly after to incorporate vocalist Wendy Smith, and they recorded a second single "The Devil Has All the Best Tunes / Walk On" that September.

=== Peak commercial success (1983–1992) ===
Prefab Sprout were signed by Keith Armstrong's Kitchenware Records in March 1983, after Armstrong heard their music played in the Newcastle branch of HMV he managed. Their two singles were reissued by Kitchenware and attracted notice including praise from Elvis Costello.

Following the departure of Michael Salmon as drummer, the band recorded their debut album with session drummer Graham Lant (brother of Venom frontman Cronos aka. Conrad Lant) in a 24-track studio in Edinburgh on a budget of £5,000. Entitled Swoon (an acronym for Songs Written Out Of Necessity), it was released on the Kitchenware label in March 1984. It was critically acclaimed, with several reviewers highlighting its unorthodox musical style and unconventional lyrics. and it reached No. 22 on the UK Albums Chart. The album attracted the attention of musician Thomas Dolby, who began producing a new batch of what McAloon would describe as simpler songs with the band. Graham Lant's relationship with Prefab Sprout ended soon after recording of Swoon, so Neil Conti joined the band as drummer. The resulting album, 1985's Steve McQueen (released in America as Two Wheels Good in anticipation of displeasure from McQueen's estate), was highly praised by critics and gave the band its first hit single on the UK Singles Chart, "When Love Breaks Down".

The band's next project was Protest Songs, a sparsely-produced and quickly recorded album intended for a limited release in late 1985. The album was put on hold by CBS so as not to stunt sales of Steve McQueen, finally seeing release in 1989. In 1988, the band released their follow-up to Steve McQueen, From Langley Park to Memphis. The album gave the band their biggest commercial success in the UK with the single "The King of Rock 'n' Roll". The song is written from the perspective of a washed-up singer who had a one-hit wonder in the 1950s with a novelty song featuring the chorus "Hot dog, jumping frog, Albuquerque". It reached No. 7 in the UK Singles Chart, their only single to reach the Top 10. From Langley Park to Memphis included guest appearances from Stevie Wonder and Pete Townshend, and used multiple producers including Thomas Dolby, who could not commit to working on the entire album.

In 1990, Jordan: The Comeback, fully produced by Thomas Dolby, was nominated for a BRIT Award. Though the music was more accessible than their earlier material, the lyrics and subject matter remained characteristically oblique and suggestive. McAloon has alluded in interviews to several albums' worth of songs that he has written but are unreleased/unrecorded including amongst others, concept albums based on the life of Michael Jackson, the history of the world (Earth: The Story So Far) and a fictional superhero (Zorro the Fox).

Their greatest hits, A Life of Surprises: The Best of Prefab Sprout, gave them their biggest US hit, "If You Don't Love Me", which spent several weeks in the Top 10 on the dance chart. McAloon joked in the album liner notes about the band's lack of touring over the past decade.

=== Line-up changes (1997–2001) ===
After a five-year hiatus, Prefab Sprout released their first new studio album since 1990's Jordan, Andromeda Heights, in 1997. After its release, Wendy Smith left the band to pursue a new career as a voice instructor.

A double album anthology, the 38 Carat Collection was released by CBS in 1999 as the group was leaving the record label. The group's US label, Epic, belatedly reissued this set as The Collection in early 2001. To promote the compilation, in 2000 the band embarked on their first UK tour in ten years.

In 2001 the band, now reduced to Paddy and Martin McAloon, released The Gunman and Other Stories, a concept album themed on the American Wild West, produced by Tony Visconti. The opening track "Cowboy Dreams" was a hit for the British actor-singer Jimmy Nail. Though critically acclaimed, neither enjoyed major commercial success.

=== Paddy McAloon solo project (2003–) ===
After being diagnosed with a medical disorder that seriously impaired his vision, Paddy McAloon released the album I Trawl the Megahertz under his own name in 2003 on the EMI Liberty label. Fifteen years later, in autumn 2018, the album was reissued on Sony Music as a Prefab Sprout record, as originally intended.

In early 2007 a remastered edition of Steve McQueen was released in a two-CD package, containing new versions of eight of the songs from the original album, in different arrangements performed by McAloon on acoustic guitar.

Prefab Sprout's first album of new material since 2001, Let's Change the World with Music, was released on 7 September 2009. The album is actually a collection of McAloon solo demos originally recorded in the early 1990s, intended for an unmade full band Prefab Sprout album.

Crimson/Red, consisting of developed versions of tracks from the vaults, was released on 7 October 2013 on vinyl and CD on the Icebreaker records label. A limited edition box set with an interview CD was also released. The lead single was "The Best Jewel Thief in the World". Crimson/Red was a solo project, with Paddy McAloon singing, playing and programming all of the music on the album on his own.

In a 2013 interview, McAloon explained that his health issues (in particular, the deterioration of his hearing and eyesight) now dictated the way in which Prefab Sprout music was recorded, making it impractical and even impossible for any other musicians to be involved, but that he remained fond of and grateful to his former bandmates.

On 3 March 2017, McAloon's manager Keith Armstrong, one-time head of Kitchenware Records, posted a short clip on Instagram of McAloon performing a new song "America" to a camcorder; operated by McAloon himself. A longer version appears on Armstrong's YouTube page.

On 8 November 2018, Rough Trade announced the availability of vinyl LP and CD versions of I Trawl the Megahertz, including a white vinyl special edition of 1000 copies. On the same day, Sony Music announced the release under their "Legacy" brand. The Sony press release notes that although this was originally a solo album, it is now fitting to classify it as a Prefab Sprout record.

Since 2023 bass player Martin McAloon has toured and performed Prefab Sprout material as a solo artist.

=== Unreleased material ===
Several interviews have described a significant vault of unreleased material, credited either to Prefab Sprout or to McAloon himself. Crimson/Red was based on tracks from the vault, and Let's Change the World with Music was released in a form that was substantially similar to its 1993 demo form.

On 10 December 2018, Paddy McAloon did an interview on the Today programme on BBC Radio 4. McAloon said that Sony would be making further releases, and that since 2013 he had been working on an album of unreleased material, Femmes Mythologiques, to be issued in September 2019. During the radio appearance, he played a segment of a song called "Cleopatra".

== Band name ==
Several inaccurate stories have circulated about the origins of the band's unusual name. According to the Guinness Book of British Hit Singles & Albums, the band's name was a mondegreen from the song "Jackson" ("We got married in a fever, hotter than a pepper sprout"), misheard by frontman Paddy McAloon. McAloon has maintained that the name was entirely made-up, stating in a 1984 interview; "I was asked about the name so many times I used to invent stories about it. The truth of the matter is that I made it up. Around that time all the groups were supposed to mean something ... and when you are 13 you think it's profound, that there must be some secrecy. I liked the idea and so thought of two odd words, put them together and have kept it, basically because it reminds me of how I used to look at things".

== Members ==
Current members

- Paddy McAloon – vocals, guitars, keyboards, programming, piano, harmonica, bass guitar (1978–present)

Former members

- Martin McAloon – bass guitar (1978–2001)
- Michael Salmon – drums, percussion (1978–1983)
- Wendy Smith – vocals, guitars, keyboards, piano, tambourine (1982–2000)
- Feona Attwood – vocals (1982)
- Graham Lant – drums, percussion (1983–1984)
- John Hendry – drums, percussion (1984)
- Neil Conti – drums, percussion (1984–1993, 2000)
- Paul Smith – drums, percussion (1997)

Touring musicians

- Kevin Armstrong – guitar (1985)
- Michael Graves – keyboards (1985–1986)

== Discography ==
- Swoon (1984)
- Steve McQueen (1985)
- From Langley Park to Memphis (1988)
- Protest Songs (1989)
- Jordan: The Comeback (1990)
- Andromeda Heights (1997)
- The Gunman and Other Stories (2001)
- I Trawl the Megahertz (2003)
- Let's Change the World with Music (2009)
- Crimson/Red (2013)
