= The King of Rock 'n' Roll =

Single by Prefab Sprout

from the album From Langley Park to Memphis
- B-side: "Moving the River"
- Released: March 1988
- Genre: Pop rock; synth-pop; new wave
- Length: 4:26
- Label: Kitchenware
- Songwriter: Paddy McAloon
- Producer: Thomas Dolby

Prefab Sprout singles chronology
"Cars and Girls" (1988)	"The King of Rock 'n' Roll" (1988)	"Hey Manhattan!" (1988)

"The King of Rock 'n' Roll" is a single by English pop band Prefab Sprout, released by Kitchenware Records in March 1988. It was the second single taken from their album of that year, From Langley Park to Memphis. It remains the band's biggest chart success in their native UK, reaching number 7 on the UK Singles Chart, where it spent 11 weeks.

== Composition ==
Paddy McAloon wrote "The King of Rock 'n' Roll" in February 1985 as a companion piece to another new song he wrote at that time, "Cars and Girls". The lyric was prompted by an NME article about an Edwyn Collins gig where Collins covered Kevin Johnson's "Rock and Roll (I Gave You the Best Years of My Life)". McAloon's dislike for songs with 'rock 'n' roll' in the title compelled him to write one of his own.

The song's lyrics concern a washed-up 1950s star who is only remembered for his one-hit novelty song. McAloon has described "The King of Rock 'n' Roll" as a purpose-built catchy song, and Rolling Stone's David Wild described the song as a "bouncy, seemingly upbeat pop tune" that "actually tells the rather barbed tale of a middle-aged one-hit wonder condemned to sing the same juvenile ditty over and over".

The chorus of "Hot dog, jumping frog, Albuquerque" has been interpreted by some as lyrics from the washed-up character's hit. In a 2019 interview with BBC Newsnight, McAloon described the words as "haiku without the syllabic law" and said the line "hasn’t got any sense other than this vaguely American feeling to it". He had made similar comments in a 1988 interview with Rock & Folk, saying he was "playing with words for their sound" and that the line "doesn’t mean anything. It’s just a series of Americanisms." When then asked what the song was about, he said "...the refrain is a happy contrast to the rest. You might imagine that this is the song he always dreamed of writing."

The song's commercial and singalong qualities are unlike the work Prefab Sprout were known for in 1985, and McAloon initially felt the song was of no use to his band. He changed his mind and felt a lighter song may surprise fans used to his work being "very precise and delicate". That year, he joked in an interview while promoting the album Steve McQueen, "you won’t catch Prefab Sprout with titles like 'Rebel Land' or 'King of Rock ‘n’ Roll'!" (Note: "Rebel Land" was performed during the band's Peel session in August 1985, but a studio recording was never released.)

== Recording ==
The song was recorded with Steve McQueen producer Thomas Dolby for From Langley Park to Memphis, one of four songs Dolby produced for the album. Dolby could not commit to producing the entire album due to his work on the soundtrack for the critical and commercial flop Howard the Duck. Dolby added a synth bass in the verses to mimic the sound of a bullfrog, tying them to the chorus.

== Release ==
The song entered the UK Singles Chart on 23 April 1988 at number 77, eventually reaching two weeks at number 7 from 28 May to 10 June. Ultimately, the song spent 11 weeks in the top 100, and remains the band's only top ten single. Paddy McAloon made an appearance on Channel 4's Wired on 13 May 1988, performing a solo acoustic version of the song in front of Grey's Monument in the centre of Newcastle. The band promoted the single with performances of the song on Top Of The Pops and Wogan. An unusual music video was produced for the song, featuring the band lying beside a pool and attended by a frog butler, a diver who is reluctant to jump into the pool until the end, and dancing human-size hot dogs.

== Reception and legacy ==
Writing for Sound on Sound, Tom Doyle described the song as "naggingly catchy and knowingly daft". In a 2013 Red Bull Music Academy article, Angus Finlayson implored readers to "listen beyond the nonchalant synth pop bounce, you may detect a note of poignancy in this tale of an aging pop star still dining out on the success of his first hit."

Reflecting on the song in the year 2000, Prefab Sprout drummer Neil Conti declared "The King of Rock 'n' Roll" "the f***ing kiss of death for this band because it pushed everything in a poppy direction and the record company just wanted more of that. And that song was a joke! It's a song about a guy who dreams about being a rock 'n' roll star and ends up a one hit wonder – although Prefab were never a one hit wonder, it’s still ironic in a weird sort of way". McAloon has similarly acknowledged an irony in the single's success and related how Paul McCartney told him at one of his Buddy Holly-themed parties that the song was "your "My Ding-a-Ling"". (Note: A ribald novelty song written by Dave Bartholomew in 1952, "My Ding-a-Ling" was a UK and US #1 single for Chuck Berry in 1972.) The song was performed on Prefab Sprout's UK and European tours in 1990, but was notably left out of their 2000 UK tour setlists. McAloon has described himself as "reconciled to being remembered for that song" and "aware that it's a bit like being known for 'Yellow Submarine' rather than 'Hey Jude'."

== Use in other media ==
The song features in "Gatherings", a 1999 episode of Edgar Wright's sitcom Spaced, with Daisy (Jessica Stevenson) singing the chorus as "Hot dog, jumping frog, almond cookies." In 2014, the song was used in a British television advertising campaign by Boots. The 2020 Netflix series I Am Not Okay with This features a scene where Stanley Barber (Wyatt Oleff) lip syncs and dances to the song.

== Track listings ==
=== 7" vinyl single ===
Side 1

1. "The King of Rock 'n' Roll"

Side 2

1. "Moving the River"

=== 12" vinyl single ===
Side 1

1. "The King of Rock 'n' Roll"
2. "Moving the River"

Side 2

1. "Dandy of the Danube"
2. "Tin Can Pot"

=== CD single ===
1. "The King of Rock 'n' Roll"
2. "Moving the River"
3. "Dandy of the Danube"
4. "He'll Have to Go"

== Charts ==
Chart (1988)	Peak position
Denmark (Hitlisten)	7
Europe (Eurochart Hot 100)	25
Ireland (IRMA)	6
Italy Airplay (Music & Media)	17
UK Singles (Official Charts)	7

== Certifications ==
Region	Certification	Certified units/sales
United Kingdom (BPI)	Silver	200,000^{‡}
^{‡} Sales+streaming figures based on certification alone.
