= Paddy McAloon =

English musician

- Born: Patrick Joseph McAloon; 7 June 1957 (age 69); County Durham, England
- Genres: Pop, new wave
- Occupation: Singer-songwriter
- Instruments: Vocals, guitar, keyboards, bass
- Website: sproutology.co.uk

Patrick Joseph McAloon (born 7 June 1957) is an English singer-songwriter best known as a founding member of the band Prefab Sprout.

== Early life ==
McAloon was born and raised in Witton Gilbert in County Durham, England. He initially trained for the Catholic priesthood before pursuing a career in music.

== Career ==
Prefab Sprout achieved commercial success during the 1980s and early 1990s, reaching their highest chart position with "The King of Rock 'N' Roll", which peaked in the top ten of the UK singles chart.

During a 1991 interview with Rolling Stone, while touring internationally in support of Jordan: The Comeback, McAloon stated that he had never received a royalty cheque showing profit from his work with Prefab Sprout.

"We lost money touring England. We’ll lose money touring Europe. And I nearly gave myself a heart attack making the record. But when we finished it, I was thrilled to bits because we’d done it. This is the biggie. And I thought, if I never get to make a record again, at least this is something I can be proud of."

In 2003, McAloon released I Trawl the Megahertz, a spoken word and instrumental album issued under his own name through Liberty Records, an EMI subsidiary. The album reached number 54 on the UK Albums Chart. Following a period of impaired vision, which later partially recovered, Mcaloon found inspiration for the album through listening to CB radio broadcasts and call-in talk shows. In 2019, the album was reissued under the Prefab Sprout name.

In a 2013 interview, McAloon stated:

That record [I Trawl The Megahertz] was so important to me. I was disappointed—extremely—that the Guardian never even reviewed it. That stayed with me. I kept waiting week after week: "Come on, if you're thinking they don't make records like they used to, if you're looking for personal vision, something unusual—I'm your guy!" But it never came.

In 2006, Thomas Dolby remastered Prefab Sprout's Steve McQueen, which was reissued in 2007 as a double-CD edition. The second disc contains newly recorded acoustic versions of songs from the original album, produced in 2006.

On 7 September 2009, Prefab Sprout released Let's Change the World with Music, an album developed from demo recordings made in 1992.

Prefab Sprout released Crimson/Red through Icebreaker Records in October 2013. McAloon performed all the instrumental parts on the album.

On 3 March 2017, McAloon, performing under the Prefab Sprout name, appeared in a video posted to the Instagram and YouTube accounts of his manager, Keith Armstrong, the former head of Kitchenware Records, singing a new song titled "America". The song was interpreted as a possible protest against the administration of Donald Trump. Its release without accompanying publicity prompted discussion and speculation about its meaning and intended release.

== Personal life ==
As of September 2013, McAloon lived in his native County Durham with his wife and three daughters. He suffers from a detached retina and tinnitus, conditions that significantly limit his ability to work in the studio. He dedicated Crimson/Red to his wife and daughters, describing them as "the women with whom I'm lucky enough to share my life".

== See also ==
- List of bands from Newcastle, United Kingdom
- List of singer-songwriters
