= Scratching =

Turntablism technique

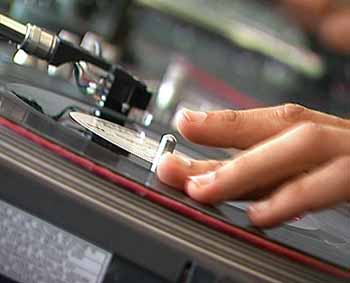
A DJ scratching a record

Scratching, sometimes referred to as scrubbing, is a DJ and turntablist technique of moving a vinyl record back and forth on a turntable to produce percussive or rhythmic sounds. A crossfader on a DJ mixer may be used to fade between two records simultaneously.

While scratching is most associated with hip hop music, where it emerged in the mid-1970s, from the 1990s it has been used in some styles of EDM like techno, trip hop, and house music and rock music such as rap rock, rap metal, rapcore, and nu metal. In hip-hop culture culture, scratching is one of the measures of a DJ's skills. DJs compete in scratching competitions at the DMC World DJ Championships and IDA (International DJ Association), formerly known as ITF (International Turntablist Federation). At scratching competitions, DJs can use only scratch-oriented gear (turntables, DJ mixer, digital vinyl systems or vinyl records only). In recorded hip-hop songs, scratched "hooks" often use portions of other songs.

== History ==
=== Precursors ===
A rudimentary form of turntable manipulation that is related to scratching was developed in the late 1940s by radio music program hosts, disc jockeys (DJs), or the radio program producers who did their own technical operation as audio console operators. It was known as back-cueing, and was used to find the very beginning of the start of a song (i.e., the cue point) on a vinyl record groove. This was done to permit the operator to back the disc up (rotate the record or the turntable platter itself counter-clockwise) in order to permit the turntable to be switched on, and come up to full speed without ruining the first few bars of music with the "wow" of incorrect, unnaturally slow-speed playing. This permitted the announcer to time their remarks, and start the turntable in time for when they wanted the music on the record to begin.

Back cueing was a basic skill that all radio production staff needed to learn, and the dynamics of it were unique to the brand of professional turntable in use at a given radio station. The older, larger and heavier turntables needed a 180-degree backward rotation to allow for run up to full speed; some of the newer 1950s models used aluminum platters and cloth-backed rubber mats which required a third of a rotational turn or less to achieve full speed when the song began. All this was done in order to present a music show on air with the least amount of silence ("alive air") between music, the announcer's patter and recorded advertising commercials. The rationale was that any "dead air" on a radio station was likely to prompt a listener to switch stations, so announcers and program directors instructed DJs and announcers to provide a continuous, seamless stream of sound–from music to an announcer to a pre-recorded commercial, to a "jingle" (radio station theme song), and then immediately back to more music.

Back-cueing was a key function in delivering this seamless stream of music. Radio personnel demanded robust equipment and manufacturers developed special tonearms, styli, cartridges and lightweight turntables to meet these demands.

=== Turntablism ===
DJ Q-Bert Hip Hop Scratching
Sample of DJ Q-Bert scratching live

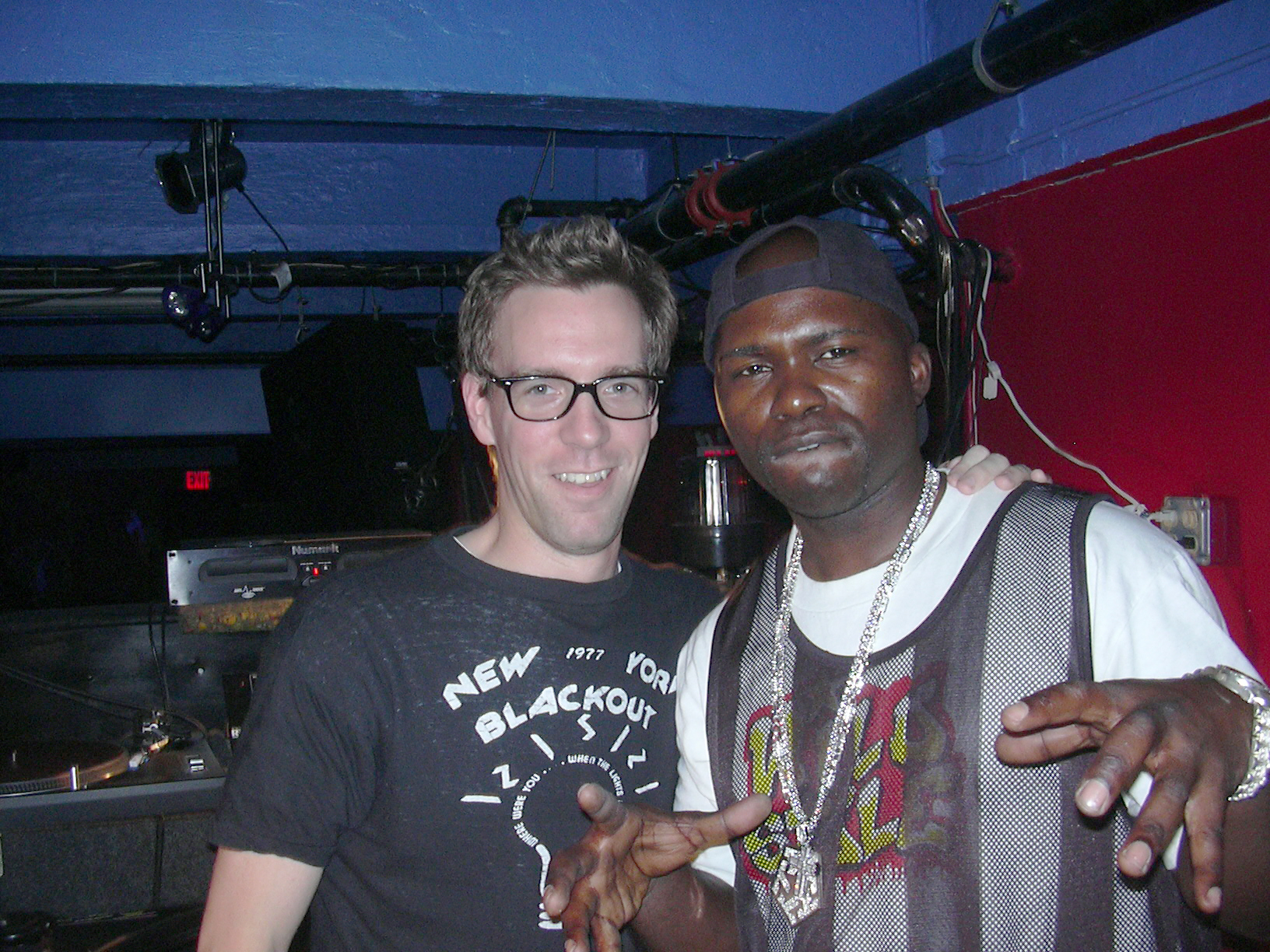
In the mid-1970s in the South Bronx, a young teen DJ named "Grand Wizzard Theodore" (right) invented the "DJ scratch" technique. Other DJs, like Grandmaster Flash, took the technique to higher levels.

Modern scratching techniques were made possible by the invention of direct-drive turntables, which led to the emergence of turntablism. Early belt-drive turntables were unsuitable for scratching since they had a slow start-up time, and they were prone to wear and tear and breakage, as the belt would break from backspinning or scratching. The first direct-drive turntable was invented by Shuichi Obata, an engineer at Matsushita (now Panasonic), based in Osaka, Japan. It eliminated belts, and instead employed a motor to directly drive a platter on which a vinyl record rests. In 1969, Matsushita released it as the SP-10, the first direct-drive turntable on the market, and the first in their influential Technics series of turntables.

In the 1970s, hip-hopians and club DJs began to use this specialized turntable equipment to move the record back and forth, creating percussive sounds and effects–"scratching"–to entertain their dance floor audiences. Whereas the 1940s–1960s radio DJs had used back-cueing while listening to the sounds through their headphones, without the audience hearing, with scratching, the DJ intentionally lets the audience hear the sounds that are being created by manipulating the record on the turntable, by directing the output from the turntable to a sound reinforcement system so that the audience can hear the sounds. Scratching was developed by early hip-hop DJs from New York City such as Grand Wizzard Theodore, who described scratching as, "nothing but the back-cueing that you hear in your ear before you push it [the recorded sound] out to the crowd." He developed the technique when experimenting with the Technics SL-1200, a direct-drive turntable released by Matsushita in 1972 when he found that the motor would continue to spin at the correct RPM even if the DJ wiggled the record back and forth on the platter. Afrika Bambaataa made a similar discovery with the SL-1200 in the 1970s. The Technics SL-1200 went on to become the most widely used turntable for the next several decades.

Jamaican-born DJ Kool Herc, who immigrated to New York City, influenced the early development of scratching. Kool Herc developed break-beat DJing, where the breaks of funk songs—being the most danceable part, often featuring percussion—were isolated and repeated for the purpose of all-night dance parties. He was influenced by Jamaican dub music, and developed his turntable techniques using the Technics SL-1100, released in 1971, due to its strong motor, durability, and fidelity.

Although previous artists such as writer and poet William S. Burroughs had experimented with the idea of manipulating a reel-to-reel tape manually to make sounds, as with his 1950s recording, "Sound Piece"), vinyl scratching as an element of hip-hop pioneered the idea of making the sound an integral and rhythmic part of music instead of an uncontrolled noise. Scratching is related to "scrubbing" (in terms of audio editing and production) when the reels of an open reel-to-reel tape deck (typically 1/4 inch magnetic audiotape) are gently rotated back and forth while the playback head is live and amplified, to isolate a specific spot on the tape where an editing "cut" is to be made. Today, both scratching and scrubbing can be done on digital audio workstations (DAWs) which are equipped for these techniques.

Where It All Started
DJ Sample of the song "Where it All Started"

Christian Marclay was one of the earliest musicians to scratch outside hip-hop. In the mid-1970s, Marclay used gramophone records and turntables as musical instruments to create sound collages. He developed his turntable sounds independently of hip-hop DJs. Although he is little-known to mainstream audiences, Marclay has been described as "the most influential turntable figure outside hip hop" and the "unwitting inventor of turntablism."

In 1981 Grandmaster Flash released the song "The Adventures of Grandmaster Flash on the Wheels of Steel" which is notable for its use of many DJ scratching techniques. It was the first commercial recording produced entirely using turntables. In 1982, Malcolm McLaren & the World's Famous Supreme Team released a single "Buffalo Gals", juxtaposing extensive scratching with calls from square dancing, and, in 1983, the EP, D'ya Like Scratchin'?, which is entirely focused on scratching. Another 1983 release to prominently feature scratching is Herbie Hancock's Grammy Award-winning single "Rockit". This song was also performed live at the 1984 Grammy Awards, and in the documentary film Scratch, the performance is cited by many 1980s-era DJs as their first exposure to scratching. The Street Sounds Electro compilation series which started in 1983 is also notable for early examples of scratching. Also, a notable piece was "For A Few Dollars More" by Bill Laswell-Michael Beinhorn band Material, released on 12" single in Japan and containing scratch performed by Grand Mixer DXT, another pioneer of scratching.

== Basic techniques ==
=== Vinyl recordings ===
Most scratches are produced by rotating a vinyl record on a direct drive turntable rapidly back and forth with the hand with the stylus ("needle") in the record's groove. This produces the distinctive sound that has come to be one of the most recognizable features of hip-hop music. Over time with excessive scratching, the stylus will cause what is referred to as "cue burn", or "record burn".

Freaky Flow - Drum N'Bass Jungle scratching
Sample of Drum N'Bass Jungle scratching

The basic equipment setup for scratching includes two turntables and a DJ mixer, which is a small mixer that has a crossfader and cue buttons to allow the DJ to cue up new music in their headphones without the audience hearing. When scratching, this crossfader is utilized in conjunction with the scratching hand that is manipulating the record platter. The hand manipulating the crossfader is used to cut in and out of the record's sound.

=== Digital vinyl systems ===
Using a digital vinyl system (DVS) consists of playing vinyl discs on turntables whose contents are a timecode signal instead of a real music record.

1. The turntables' audio outputs are connected to the audio inputs of a computer audio interface.
2. The audio interface digitizes the timecode signal from the turntables and transfers it to the computer's DJ software.
3. The DJ software uses this data (e.g., about how fast the platter is spinning) to determine the playback status, speed, scratch sound of the hardware turntables, etc., and it duplicates these effects on the digital audio files or computer tracks the DJ is using.
4. By manipulating the turntables' platters, speed controls, and other elements, the DJ thus controls how the computer plays back digitized audio and can therefore produce "scratching" and other turntablism effects on songs which exist as digital audio files or computer tracks.

There is not a single standard of DVS, so each form of DJ software has its own settings. Some DJ software such as Traktor Scratch Pro or Serato Scratch Live supports only the audio interface sold with their software, requiring multiple interfaces for one computer to run multiple programs.

Some digital vinyl systems software include:

- Traktor Scratch Pro
- Cross DVS
- VirtualDJ Pro
- Serato Scratch Live
- M-Audio Torq
- Deckadance
- Xwax

=== Non-vinyl scratching ===
While some turntablists consider the only true scratching media to be the vinyl disc, there are other ways to scratch, such as:

- Specialized DJ-CD players (CDJ) with jog wheels, allowing the DJ to manipulate a CD as if it were a vinyl record, have become widely available in the 2000s.
- A vinyl emulation is an emulation software, which may be combined with hardware elements, which allows a DJ to manipulate the playback of digital music files on a computer via a DJ control surface (generally MIDI or a HID controller). DJs can scratch, beatmatch, and perform other turntablist operations that cannot be done with a conventional keyboard and mouse. DJ software performing computer scratch operations include Traktor Pro, Mixxx, Serato Scratch Live & Itch, VirtualDJ, M-Audio Torq, DJay, Deckadance, Cross.
- DJs have also used magnetic tape, such as cassette or reel to reel to both mix and scratch. Tape DJing is rare, but Ruthless Ramsey in the US, TJ Scratchavite in Italy and Mr Tape in Latvia use exclusively tape formats to perform.

== Sounds ==
Sounds that are frequently scratched include but are not limited to drum beats, horn stabs, spoken word samples, and vocals/lyrics from other songs. Any sound recorded to vinyl can be used, and CD players providing a turntable-like interface allow DJs to scratch not only material that was never released on vinyl, but also field recordings and samples from television and movies that have been burned to CD-R. Some DJs and anonymous collectors release 12-inch singles called battle records that include trademark, novel or hard-to-find scratch "fodder" (material). The most recognizable samples used for scratching are the "Ahh" and "Fresh" samples, which originate from the song "Change the Beat" by Fab 5 Freddy.

There are many scratching techniques, which differ in how the movements of the record are combined with opening and closing the crossfader (or another fader or switch, such as a kill switch, where "open" means that the signal is audible, and "closed" means that the signal is inaudible). This terminology is not unique; the following discussion, however, is consistent with the terminology used by DJ QBert on his Do It Yourself Scratching DVD.

=== Basic techniques ===
- Faderless scratches
  - Baby scratch - The simplest scratch form, it is performed with the scratching hand only, moving the record back and forth in continuous movements while the crossfader is in the open position.
    - Scribble scratch - The scribble scratch is by rapidly pushing the record back and forth. The crossfader is not used.
    - Drag scratch - Equivalent to the baby and scribble scratch, but done more slowly. The crossfader is not used.
    - Tweak scratch - Performed while the turntable's motor is not running. The record platter is set in motion manually, then "tweaked" faster and slower to create a scratch. This scratch form is best performed with long, sustained sounds.
    - Hydrophonic scratch - A baby scratch with a "tear scratch" sound produced by the thumb running in the opposite direction as the fingers used to scratch. This rubbing of the thumb adds a vibrating effect or reverberation to forward movements on the turntable.
  - Tear scratch - Tear scratches are scratches where the record is moved in a staggered fashion, dividing the forward and backward movement into two or more movements. This allows creating sounds similar to "flare scratches" without the use of the crossfader and it allows for more complex rhythmic patterns. The term can also refer to a simpler, slower version of the chirp.
    - Orbit scratch - Describes any scratch, most commonly flares, that is repeated during the forward and backward movement of the record. "Orbit" is also used as a shorthand for two-click flares.
- Transformer scratch - with the crossfader closed, the record is moved with the scratching hand while periodically "tapping" the crossfader open and immediately closing it again.
  - Forward and backward scratch - The forward scratch, also referred to as scrubbing, is a baby scratch where the crossfader is closed during the backwards movement of the record. If the record is let go instead of being pushed forward it is also called "release scratch" or "drop". Cutting out the forward part of the record movement instead of the backward part gives a "backward scratch"
- Chirp scratch - The chirp scratch involves closing the crossfader just after playing the start of a sound, stopping the record at the same point, then pushing it back while opening the fader to create a "chirping" sound. When performed using a recording of drums, it can create the illusion of doubled scratching speed, due to the attack created by cutting in the crossfader on the backward movement.
  - Flare scratch - Begins with the crossfader open, and then the record is moved while briefly closing the fader one or more times to cut the sound out. This produces a staggering sound which can make a single "flare" sound like a very fast series of "chirps" or "tears." The number of times the fader is closed ("clicks") during the record's movement is usually used as a prefix to distinguish the variations. The flare allows a DJ to scratch continuously with less hand fatigue than would result from the transformer. The flare can be combined with the crab for an extremely rapid continuous series of scratches.
    - Euro scratch - A variation of the "flare scratch" in which two faders are used simultaneously with one hand to cut the sound much faster. It can also be performed by using only the up fader and the phono line switch to cut the sound.
- Crab scratch - Consists of moving the record while quickly tapping the crossfader open or closed with each finger of the crossfader hand. In this way, DJs are able to perform transforms or flares much faster than they could by manipulating the crossfader with the whole hand.
  - Twiddle scratch - A crab scratch using only the index and middle fingers.

=== Scratch combinations ===
More complex combinations can be generated by grouping elementary crossfader motions (such as the open, close, and tap) into three and four-move sequences. Closing and tapping motions can be followed by opens and taps, and opens can be followed by closes only.

Three move sequences	switch position at beginning and end
open-close-tap	closed-closed
tap-open-close	closed-closed
close-tap-open	open-open
open-close-open	closed-open
close-open-close	open-closed
close-tap-tap	open-closed
tap-tap-tap	closed-closed
tap-tap-open	closed-open

four move sequences	switch position at beginning and end
close-open-close-open	open-open
close-open-close-tap	open-closed
close-tap-open-close	open-closed
close-tap-tap-tap	open-closed
close-tap-tap-open	open-open
open-close-open-close	closed-closed
open-close-tap-tap	closed-closed
open-close-tap-open	closed-open
tap-tap-tap-tap	closed-closed
tap-tap-tap-open	closed-open
tap-tap-open-close	closed-closed
tap-open-close-open	closed-open
tap-open-close-tap	closed-closed

Note that some sequences of motions ultimately change the direction of the switch, whereas others end in a position such that they can be repeated immediately without having to reset the position of the switch. Sequences that change the direction of the switch can be dovetailed with sequences that change it in the opposite directions to produce repeating patterns, or can be used to transition between open and closed crossfader techniques, such as chirps/flares and transforms, respectively. These crossfader sequences are frequently combined with orbits and tears to produce combination scratches, such as the aquaman scratch, which goes "close-tap-open".

== Subculture ==
While scratching is becoming more and more popular in pop music, particularly with the crossover success of pop-hip-hop tracks in the 2010s, sophisticated scratching and other expert turntablism techniques are still predominantly an underground style developed by the DJ subculture. The Invisibl Skratch Piklz from San Francisco focuses on scratching. In 1994, the group was formed by DJs Q-Bert, Disk & Shortkut and later Mix Master Mike. In July 2000, San Francisco's Yerba Buena Center for the Arts held Skratchcon2000, the first DJ Skratch forum that provided "the education and development of skratch music literacy". In 2001, Thud Rumble became an independent company that works with DJ artists to produce and distribute scratch records.

In 2004, Scratch Magazine, one of the first publications about hip-hop DJs and record producers, released its debut issue, following in the footsteps of the lesser-known Tablist magazine. Pedestrian is a UK arts organisation that runs Urban Music Mentors workshops led by DJs. At these workshops, DJs teach youth how to create beats, use turntables to create mixes, act as an MC at events, and perform club sets.

== Use outside hip-hop ==
Scratching has been incorporated into a number of other musical genres, including pop, rock, jazz, some subgenres of heavy metal (notably nu metal) and some contemporary and avant-garde classical music performances. For recording use, samplers are often used instead of physically scratching a vinyl record.

DJ Product©1969, formerly of the rap rock band Hed PE, recalled that the punk rock band the Vandals was the first rock band he remembered seeing use turntable scratching. Product©1969 also recalled the early rap metal band Proper Grounds, which was signed to Madonna's Maverick Records, as being another one of the first rock bands to utilize scratching in their music.

Guitarist Tom Morello, known for his work with Rage Against the Machine and Audioslave, has performed guitar solos that imitate scratching by using the kill switch on his guitar. Perhaps the best-known example is "Bulls on Parade", in which he creates scratch-like rhythmic sounds by rubbing the strings over the pick-ups while using the pickup selector switch as a crossfader.

Since the 1990s, scratching has been used in a variety of popular music genres such as nu metal, exemplified by Linkin Park, Slipknot and Limp Bizkit. It has also been used by artists in pop music (e.g. Nelly Furtado) and alternative rock (e.g. Incubus). Scratching is also popular in various electronic music styles, such as techno.

== See also ==
- List of turntablists
- Tape-bow violin
- Vinyl emulation software

== Sources ==
- Allmusic's Grand Wizard Theodore biography (also at Artist Direct)
- DJ Grandmaster Flash quoted in Toop, David (1991). Rap Attack 2, 65. New York: Serpent's Tail. ISBN 1-85242-243-2.
