= Digital vinyl system =

Ability to physically manipulate audio playback with turntables

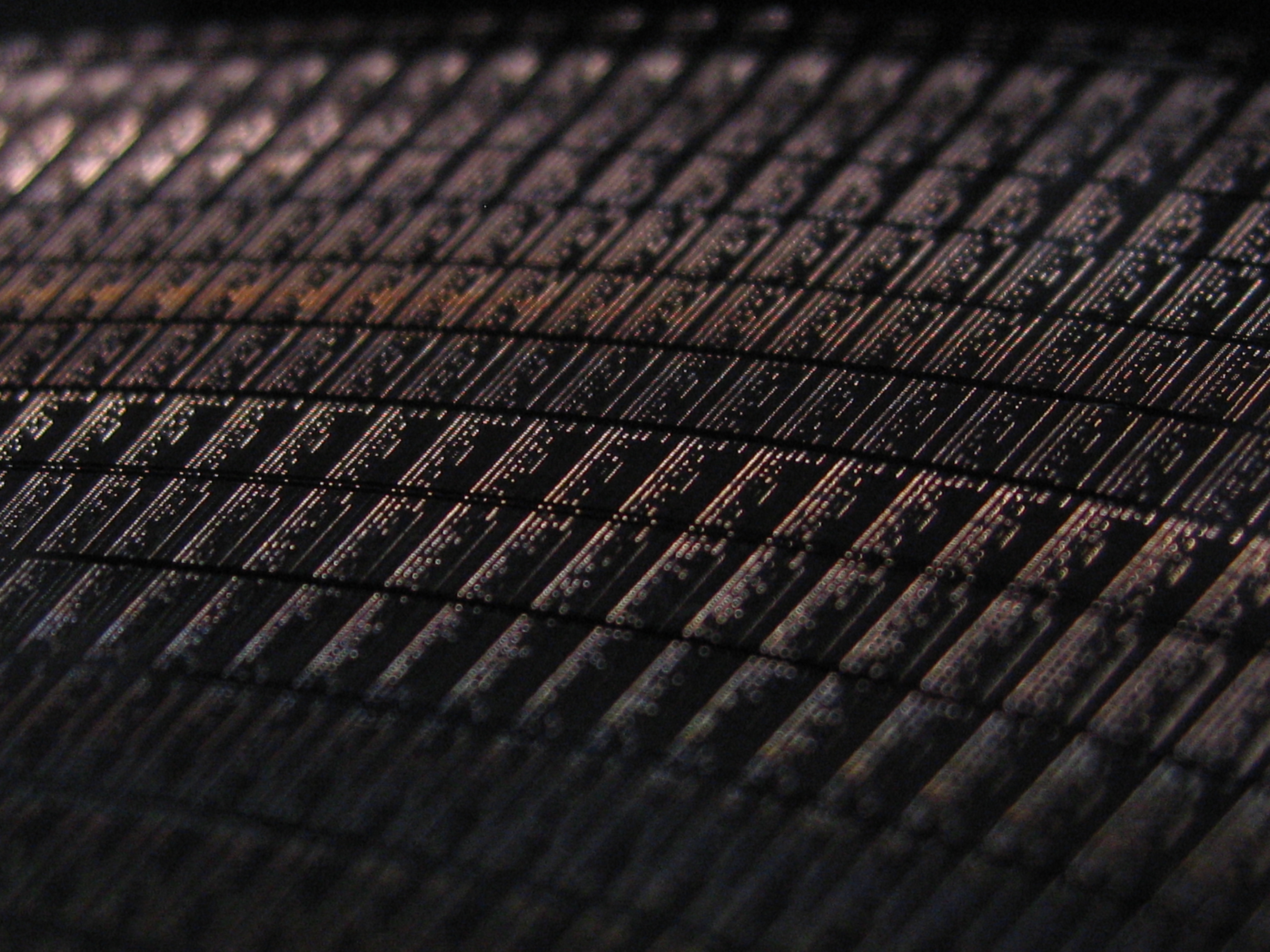
A close-up of a time-coded vinyl record

A Digital vinyl system (DVS) allows a DJ to physically manipulate the playback of digital audio files on a computer using turntables as an interface, thus preserving the hands-on control and feel of DJing with vinyl. This has the added advantage of using turntables to play back audio recordings not available in phonograph form. This method allows DJs to scratch, beatmatch, and perform other turntablism that would be impossible with a conventional keyboard-and-mouse computer interface or less tactile DJ controllers.

A digital vinyl system may include a special time-coded vinyl record or be purely software.

== Characteristics ==
A digital vinyl system normally uses special vinyl records which are played on conventional turntables. The vinyl is a recording of analog audio signals often referred to as timecode. The turntables' audio output - the timecode recording - is routed into an analog-to-digital converter, or ADC. This ADC may be a multi-channel soundcard or a dedicated external USB or FireWire audio interface box, DJ controller device or compatible mixer (usually distributed with the software). The ADC sends digital time code information to the software, which then translates the signal into corresponding changes in the playback speed, direction, and position of a digital audio file. The audio file will react as if were pressed directly onto the record. The manipulated audio output of the program is then sent back through the DAC or the computer's sound card, and can be routed into an audio mixer where it can be mixed like any other analog audio signal.

The result is digital audio playback that sounds like music manipulated by an analog vinyl recording. However, there is always a short delay between the needle's reading of the time code and the software's playback of the audio. The delay time is treated as a figure of merit for vinyl emulation products. A shorter delay allows the DJ to have better response and control of the music and is usually not noticeable by the user or listener.

In some countries, for example Finland, a digital DJ license is required to legally play copyrighted music publicly with vinyl emulation software.

== Software packages ==
Final Scratch was the first DVS software sold publicly. Since its release in 2001, many similar software and hardware packages have been developed and marketed.

Notable applications licensed under the terms of the GNU General Public License:

- Mixxx
- xwax

Notable proprietary software applications include:

- Deckadance
- Final Scratch
- MixVibes DVS
- Serato Scratch Live
- Torq
- Traktor Scratch Pro

Some DVS software products are marketed with specific time coded vinyl, while others are software-only products.

The following table lists DVS packages which come with specific time-coded vinyl:

Comparison of digital vinyl systems
Product	Manufacturer	Related software	Available external audio card
VirtualDJ Timecoded Vinyl	Atomix Productions	VirtualDJ	No
Touch DVS Record	Intimidation	Touch DVS	TouchDVS interface
Torq Control Vinyl	M-Audio	Torq DJ software	Torq Conectiv
MixVibes DVS	MixVibes	MixVibes DVS	No
Ms Pinky Vinyl	Ms Pinky	Interdimensional Wrecked System	No
Traktor Scratch Pro	Native Instruments	Traktor Pro	Audio 8 DJ or Audio 4 DJ
Traktor Scratch Pro 2	Native Instruments	Traktor Pro 2	Audio 10 DJ or Audio 6 DJ
Virtual Vinyl	Numark	CUE	DJiO (with Virtual Vinyl - Rear Connections)
Scratch Live	Serato	Scratch Live	Rane SL 1, Rane SL 2, Rane SL 3, Rane SL 4
Serato DJ	Serato	Serato DJ	Rane SL 2, Rane SL 3, Rane SL 4
FS Scratch Record	Stanton	Traktor FS	ScratchAmp
FS 1.0 Record	Stanton	Final Scratch 1.0 (Linux)	ScratchAmp

This table presents lists software-only DVS packages (Note that software products presented here are these which are "controllable" through a time-coded vinyl):

Comparison of software-only vinyl emulation
Product	Manufacturer
Deckadance	Image-Line
xwax	Mark Hills
Mixxx	The Mixxx team

== See also ==
- Audio editing software
- Music software
