= Xwax =

Open source vinyl emulation software

xwax
- Developer: Mark Hills
- Release: 2006
- Stable release: 1.8 / August 18, 2021; 4 years ago
- Written in: C
- Operating system: Linux
- License: GPL-2.0-only
- Website: xwax: Digital Vinyl System for Linux

xwax is an open-source vinyl emulation software. It was initially developed in 2006 as proprietary software. In May 2007 xwax was licensed under the GPL-2.0-only, making it the first open source software of this kind.

Unlike the software supplied with some proprietary packages for vinyl emulation, xwax is hardware independent. Notably, it can be used with the audio device and timecode recordings supplied with the Scratch Live program, and older versions of the Traktor Scratch program, and the audio interface supplied with the original Final Scratch.

The xwax source code is used to decode timecodes for vinyl control in Mixxx and is also used in the PiDeck project on the Raspberry Pi.

== Features ==
- Separated processes of the interface from the external decoder.
  - The benefit of this separation is that should a faulty track be loaded and crash the only thing affected is the decoder. The primary xwax interface will still be up and usable.
  - An external decoder also allows you to play what ever digital audio encoding you wish to use.
- MIDI controller support
  - 1.2 was the first version to introduce midi controller support, allowing the user to manipulate cue points with the Dicer DJ controller from Novation
- A fully scalable UI that makes xwax suitable for high resolution displays.
- A "software pre-amp" that allows you to use an un-amplified turntable output with xwax without a hardware preamplifier.
