= Cross/CrossDJ =

DJ software

CrossDJ
- Developer: Mixvibes
- Stable release: 3.3 / 14 October 2014
- Operating system: Microsoft Windows, Mac OS X, Apple iOS, Android
- Type: Digital DJ Software
- Website: www.mixvibes.com

Cross/CrossDJ is a digital vinyl and DJ mixing software developed by the French company Mixvibes. This software provides DJs with a digital platform with which they can mix and perform their music. Since its release in 2008, it has become Mixvibes primary focus.

== Overview ==
Cross/CrossDJ 3.3, released in October 2014, features a four-channel mixer, four-band EQs, eight pad samplers, a range of effects, seamless looping, automatic beat-gridding, and beat-matching. It is also known for its seamless integration with ITunes tracks and other media formats.

Cross/CrossDJ is adapted to both PC and Mac platforms and is compatible with nearly all external MIDI controllers. DJs are able to control the software using either the mouse/keyboard or MIDI controllers. This DJ mixing software offers all effects, loops, locators, samplers that you can find on any regular controller and the beat matching/quantize features correct any human rhythmic errors to ensure smooth transitions. The modular interface has been redesigned with the most recent version so it can be customized to the unique preferences of each user.

In 2012, Mixvibes expanded their Cross software range to cover nearly all Apple devices. CrossDJ for iPad was launched early 2012, a professional DJing application for the iPad, and features all the necessary channels, FX and EQs. The CrossDJ remotes were released for iPad/iPhones and iPod Touch where users can control their mixes at a distance from their computer through a connection on their Apple device.

There is also a version of Cross DJ for Android.

=== Cross ===
Mixvibes' specific version Cross, is a vinyl emulation software which allows traditional turntable Vinyl and CD integration, bringing in timecode control and allows DJs to mix and scratch their digital audio files. This product is used throughout the turntable and scratch DJ community. The software allows manipulation and playback of digital audio sources using traditional vinyl and turntables. This provides DJs with a platform to scratch or beat match their tracks without losing the genuine vinyl/CD feel.

=== DVS ===
Mixvibes DVS (Digital Vinyl System) was a vinyl emulation software launched in 2004 by Mixvibes. This software will be soon discontinued, with Cross (see above) being its replacement. Cross retains all the features and effects of DVS. This software was Mixvibes' main focus for many years and comes highly regarded within the scratch and turntablist community.

=== Rekordbox ===
Rekordbox Logo

Mixvibes also used Cross as a base for designing Rekordbox, for the Japanese corporation Pioneer, one of the leading DJ hardware manufacturing companies. Rekordbox is exclusively repackaged for Pioneer and comes bundled with many of their products.

==== Streaming music ====
Rekordbox supports DJing with streaming music from Spotify, Apple Music, Tidal, Beatport, Beatsource, and SoundCloud, with the relevant subscription from each service. Caching tracks for offline play is supported with Tidal, Beatport, Beatsource, and SoundCloud; it is not available for Spotify. Stem mixing is disabled for Spotify and Apple Music. Stem mixing with Tidal requires an add-on subscription from Tidal called "DJ Extension".

Rekordbox for Android supports Apple Music, Tidal, and SoundCloud; offline play is not supported.

== History ==
Cross was first introduced into the DJ community in 2008. Mixvibes drew from their previous experience of their most popular software DVS (Digital Vinyl Systems) which was composed of a digital mixer interface and allowed the integration of external vinyl or CD control. The software has only been updated a few times, recently releasing Cross2.0.

Cross has been release in numerous versions:

- Cross – An all-inclusive version with plug in available for vinyl and CD users
- CrossDJ – Complete software version for DJs who use MIDI controllers, keyboard or mouse
- CrossDJ LE – Software comes bundled with various controllers in partnerships
- CrossDJ for iPad – Professional application for iPad DJs
- CrossDJ Remotes – Control the software on your laptop by using your iPhone/iPod or iPad as a remote
- CrossDJ Free – Basic version of Cross Software but released as a free edition

=== CrossDJ LE ===
This software has been bundled with numerous DJ MIDI controllers that have been released

- Mixvibes U-Mix Control 2
- Denon MC3000
- Gemini FirstMix
- Numark iDJ3

== See also ==
- Traktor
- VirtualDJ
- Mixxx
- List of music software
