= CDJ =

Digital music players for DJs

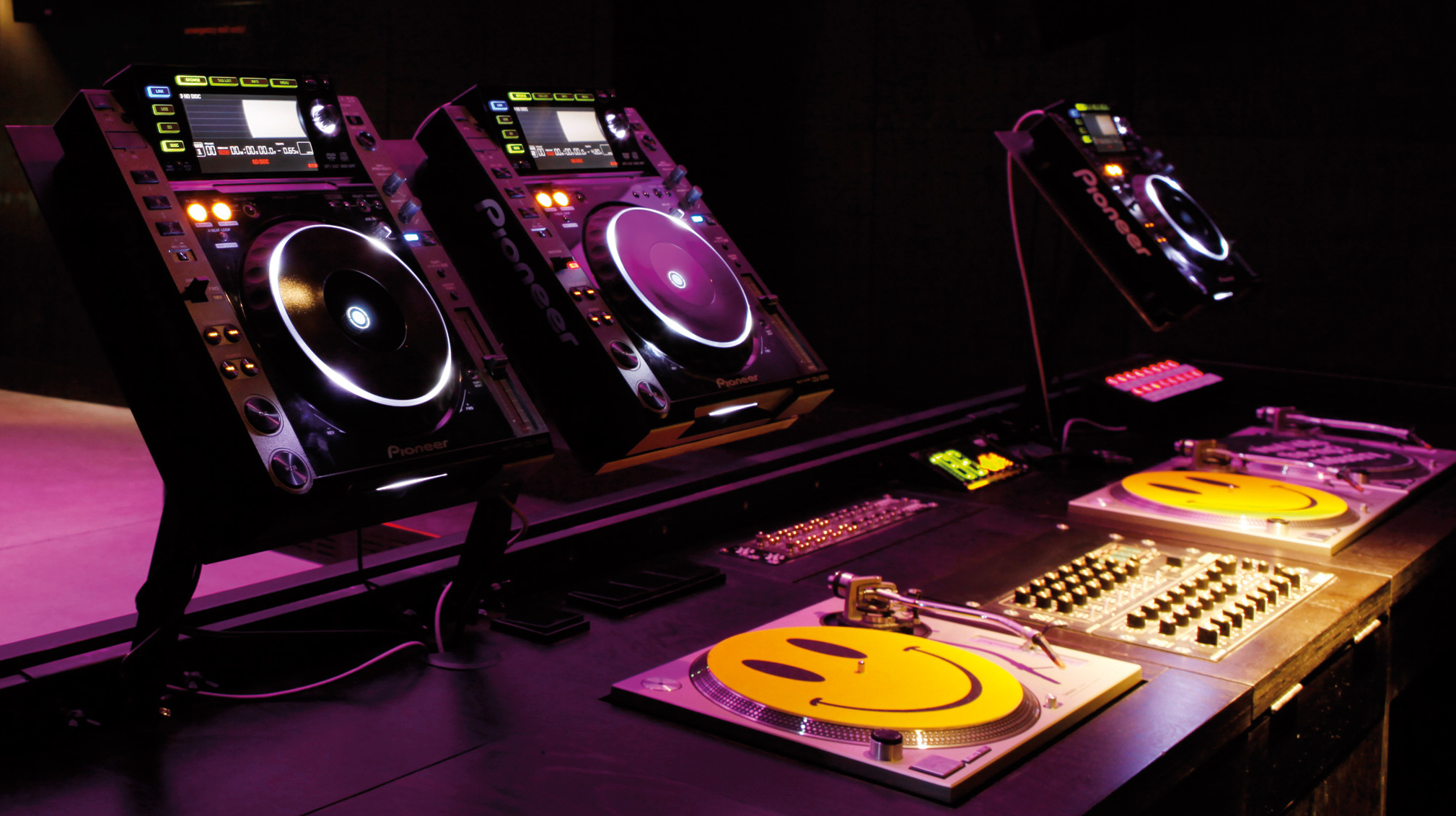
A DJ setup in a nightclub, consisting of three CDJs (top), three turntables for vinyl records and a DJ mixer

A CDJ (Compact Disc Jockey) is a specialized digital music player for DJing. Originally designed to play music from compact discs, modern CDJs can typically play digital music files stored on USB flash drives or SD cards. In typical use, at least two CDJs are plugged into a DJ mixer. CDJs have jog wheels and pitch faders that allow manipulation of the digital music similar to a vinyl record on a DJ turntable. Many have additional features that are not present on turntables, such as looping or beat analysis. Additionally, some can function as DJ controllers to control the playback of digital files in DJ software such as VirtualDJ and Serato.

Many pro audio companies such as Gemini, Denon DJ, Numark, Stanton, and Vestax produced DJ quality CD players. In 1993 Denon DJ was the first to implement a 2-piece rack-mounted dual-deck variable-pitch CD player with a jog wheel and instant cue button for DJs. It quickly became the industry standard and was widely adopted in most clubs and mobile DJs throughout the 90s up until 2004 when Pioneer made an impact with the CDJ-1000. Pioneer DJ CDJs have since become widely regarded as the industry standard.

The Pioneer CDJ-400, CDJ-800, CDJ-850K, CDJ-1000, CDJ-900, CDJ-2000, CDJ-3000, and CDJ-3000X have a vinyl emulation mode that allows the operator to manipulate music on a CD as if it were on a turntable. Models released prior to the CDJ-1000 lacked this feature. Pioneer CDJs released after the CDJ-400 can play from USB sticks as well as CDs. Pioneer integrated its software rekordbox with the CDJs to prepare music with cue points, accurate BPM, and search/playlist functions.

== 1990s ==
=== CDJ-500 ===
The CDJ-500 (known as the Mark 1 once the second version was released) was recognized by Pioneer DJ as their first CDJ CD player, released in 1994. However, there was a Pioneer CDJ-300 that was released in 1994 as a budget model for the CDJ-500.

The CDJ-500 was the first Pioneer DJ player to have a Jog Dial, (although Technics SL-P1200 was the first ever to feature a jog dial in 1986), allowing for cueing of the CD unlike rack-mounted CD players that were common at the time. It included a loop function, as well as loop-out adjust, and other facilities associated with looping samples from the track being played. The pitch control was +/- 10% only, and Master Tempo allowed the pitch to be locked despite tempo changes being made.

All models of the CDJ-500 had top-opening CD loading, which is opposite to all the later ranges of CDJs (starting with CDJ-100S in 1999) which have since had front slot-loading of discs.

=== CDJ-500II ===
Pioneer later released the CDJ-500II, with the only changes being slightly faster performance, Loop Out adjustable and the maximum loop length was increased to 10 minutes.

=== CDJ-500S ===
The CDJ-500S (also known as the CDJ-700S in the United States) released in 1997, was a smaller version of the CDJ-500. It marked the first inclusion of an anti-skip system.

=== CDJ-100S ===
The CDJ-100S was a CDJ model that was released in early 1998. The CDJ-100S was a basic CD player with a pitch controller and three sound effect options.

== 2000s ==
=== CMX-5000 ===
The CMX-5000, released in March 2000, was Pioneer's first attempt to enter the 19" rack mountable dual CD player-market (though, with an optional installation bracket, it had previously been possible to install two CDJ-500S players side by side into an industry standard rack) that had previously been dominated by Denon.

The CMX-5000 consisted of a 2U section with a pair of slot-loading CD drives and a 3U 'controller' section with a pair of jog wheels and control buttons for the CD drive below.

=== CDJ-1000 ===
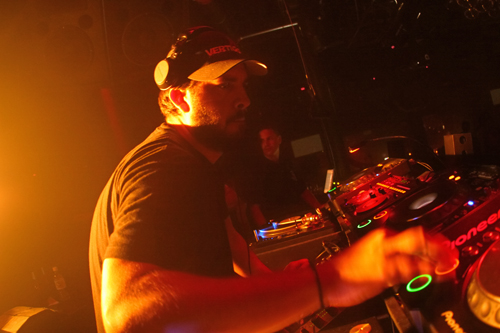
Pioneer CDJ-1000s in use

The CDJ-1000 (retroactively known as the MK1 after the release of MK2) was introduced in 2001. Featuring "Vinyl Mode" which dramatically improved jog wheel performance, the CDJ-1000 was generally accepted as the first CD player that could accurately emulate a vinyl turntable - including the ability to scratch - soon established the CDJ-1000 as an industry standard for DJs.

The player implemented a large touch-sensitive platter with a digital display in the middle that could relay information about the position in the music. Although this platter was not driven (meaning that it does not rotate by itself) like a turntable, the display in the center showed positioning information for accurate cueing. Also there was an orange cue marker that simulates the stickers used by scratch DJs. The waveform display gave DJs the opportunity to look ahead on tracks.

The CDJ-1000 (and its reincarnations) became a popular tool for dance clubs and DJs, and is currently the most widely used DJ-style CD deck in nightclubs. The player supported playback from CD, CD-R and CD-RW and implemented all of the essential features for DJ CD players such as looping and pitch changing in addition to less common features such as reverse play-back and turntable break-stop and start. It included the master tempo-function introduced on the earlier CDJ-500 & CDJ-500S models, whereby the music changed speed while maintaining pitch.

The CDJ-1000 is generally regarded as the first CD player to be widely adopted in club use. Before its introduction, few clubs adopted CD decks, either due to their lack of DJ functionality and overall robustness, or due to the fact that DJs still preferred the vinyl format, as most of the music they played was still far more prevalent on vinyl than CD media. The introduction of recordable CD-R and then CD-RW media discs and stand-alone recorders able to record music onto them facilitated widespread adoption of the CDJ-1000. Before this, DJs who wanted to test a new piece of music they might have made themselves in a studio, in either a club or as early promotional items to radio DJs, often had to rely on getting acetate discs produced. These were both expensive to produce and had inherent short lifespan; as after a few plays the disc would wear-out and thus be completely unplayable.

=== CDJ-800 ===
The CDJ-800 released in 2002 used a different mechanism for the jog wheel than the 1000 - it could perform "quick return" if the top surface of the wheel was pressed, then released. The general design purpose of the CDJ-800 was to offer DJs the facilities they have in the club on CDJ-1000s at home for a lower price. While the CDJ-1000 had a button to override the pitch slider, the CDJ-800 slider had a center detent, which was "easy to center." The CDJ-800 did not have the CDJ-1000's "hot cue" feature, and had only "one cue, and one loop" at a time, though these could be saved for up to 500 CDs. The CDJ-800 could alter loop "out-points" while playing, but could not alter in-points; loops had to be re-captured. Though the CDJ-1000 would relay (alternate CDs) in both vinyl and CDJ jog modes, the CDJ-800 would only relay in CDJ jog mode. The CDJ-800 also had an "auto-beat" function that the 1000 does not.

The CDJ-800 was introduced in November 2002 and discontinued in February 2006 in favor of the updated second-generation version, called CDJ-800-MK2.

=== DMP-555 ===
The DMP-555 was a single deck tabletop CD-player in Pioneer's range for DJs that was introduced in April 2002 and discontinued during 2004. The DMP-555 featured several innovative features, such as playback from SD card, and MP3 playback from either memory card or optical media. It also included the ability (unique in Pioneer's DJ product line) to cue from one media source and playback from another all on the same unit, allowing one to DJ two tracks from a single DMP-555 alone. The product was hobbled by a lack of support and updates, a 2GB limit on SD card capacity, and the inability to write MP3 files directly to the SD card. A special Pioneer-branded writer was required, and transfers had to be encrypted through custom Pioneer software because of music label concerns over copyright infringement.

=== CMX-3000 ===
The CMX-3000 was Pioneer's second attempt to enter the market of rack-mountable dual deck CD-players. Released in 2003, in the wake of the CDJ-1000, the player was - and still is - often mistakenly advertised as a 19" inch rack mountable equivalent of dual CDJ-1000s even though the intended target audiences for the products, as well as their comparative pricing, were entirely in different leagues. The misconception is possibly caused by the fact that while Pioneer's earlier dual deck CD-player, the CMX-5000, only had a jog wheel comparable to earlier single deck CD-players for doing pitch bending, the CMX-3000 also allowed distinct jog mode that enabled the user to use the jog wheel for scratching, a feature that thus far was only available on the top-of-the line CDJ-1000. The jog wheel however relied upon the movement of the wheel itself and was not touch sensitive as opposed to the CDJ-1000, CDJ-800 and CDJ-400. Therefore, the scratch was intended as an effect or for cueing a track, and was not appropriate for stopping the track by touch unlike other CDJ models.

Mainly due to the product's comparative pricing (for the price of two CDJ-1000s, a DJ could get almost three CMX-3000 units with two players each) the CMX-3000s found their way to the setups of many mobile DJ's as well as into the booths of many nightclubs as a backup player in case the industry standard CDJ-1000s fail during a night.

=== CDJ-1000MK2 ===
An updated version of the CDJ-1000, the CDJ-1000 MK2 was released in July 2003 with additional features like an improved jog wheel and faster response time than in the original model. The product was discontinued in 2006 when the MK3 was introduced into the market.

=== CDJ-200 ===
The CDJ-200 was the discontinued budget model CDJ CD player released in 2004. It was similar in size to the CDJ-100S, however features such as MP3 playback capabilities and loop functions were added or improved. Both the CDJ-100S and the CDJ-200 had similar options to manipulate the CD, however they lacked the vinyl modes of other models.

=== DVJ-X1 ===
The DVJ-X1 was a DVD quasi-turntable that allowed VJ's to scratch and mix video like a vinyl record. Released in 2004 and designed for professional use in clubs, it featured real-time digital video scratching, looping and instant hot cueing. It had capability to sync video and audio streams even when being pitched or reversed. It also played CDs with features similar to the regular CDJ-1000 CD turntable.

In 2006, Pioneer introduced a successor unit, the DVJ-1000.

=== CDJ-800-MK2 ===
Pioneer released the CDJ-800-MK2 in February 2006 replacing the CDJ-800. The main difference is that the CDJ-800-MK2 could play MP3 files from CDs. The design had also been changed.

=== CDJ-1000MK3 ===
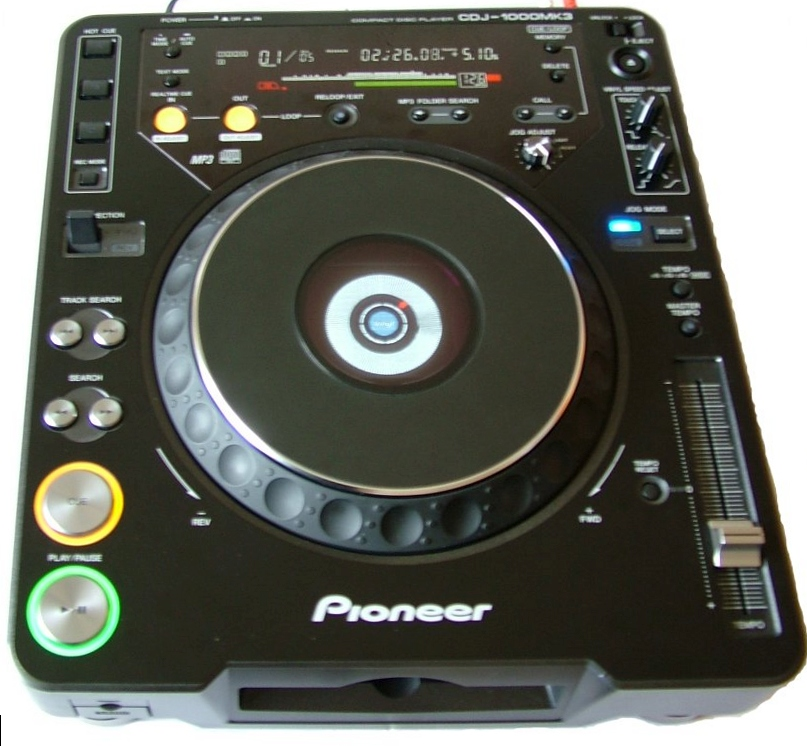
A CDJ-1000MK3

The third model of the 1000 series known as the CDJ-1000 MK3 was released in March 2006.

Unlike the earlier versions, the MK3 supported playback of MP3s from CD-R and CD-RW media. Other improvements to earlier versions included bigger, lighter displays; a 100 dots waveform display instead of the earlier 50 dots waveform; the ability to record loops into hot cue slots instead of just cue points. The mechanical resistance of the jog wheel was adjustable to suit different styles of handling by the DJ. Furthermore, the MK3 used a newer SD media while the earlier incarnations used MultiMediaCard/MMC as a memory card format.

==== Discontinuation ====
Shortly after the introduction of the CDJ-1000's successors, the Pioneer CDJ-900 and the Pioneer CDJ-2000, in a statement, UK sales manager Martin Dockree said:

It is with mixed feelings that today we announce to the channel the discontinuation of the CDJ-1000MK3…….thanks to the hard work of our then newly appointed direct retailers, installers and established distribution, as well as the DJs who instantly recognised it as the first real practical DJ CD player, it very quickly became an industry standard fixture in the DJ booth.

=== DVJ-1000 ===
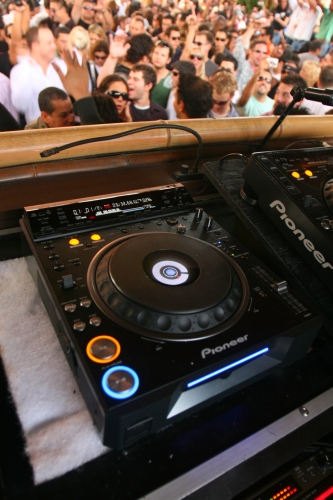
Pioneer DVJ1000

The DVJ-1000 was a digital turntable capable of playing back video data on DVDs, as well as CD-Audio, and MP3 audio on both CDs and DVDs. Created by Pioneer Electronics in 2006, it was the successor to the Pioneer DVJ-X1.

Unlike the DVJ-X1, the DVJ-1000 was approximately the same dimensions as Pioneer's audio-only CD turntables (CDJ-1000), and could be fitted into existing enclosures with relative ease, allowing for an easy upgrade path for club owners and sound engineers.

In addition, the unit borrowed several usability features from the CDJ line of that era, including a brighter fluorescent display on both the information screen and the central on-jog display. Loop adjustment features were carried over as well, and a new automatic 4-beat loop feature had been included on this unit.

Being that the unit played back DVD material, several new outputs had been added, including S/PDIF, composite outputs, a preview video output, which also doubled as a 'dashboard' for searching through video and MP3 content, as well as control outputs for compatible Pioneer DJ mixers.

For the travelling DJ, the unit was multi-system, outputting both PAL and NTSC video signals for near-global compatibility.

As part of its marketing strategy, Pioneer had equipped several noted DJs with the new unit, including Sander Kleinenberg.

The unit retailed for US$2500 (£1599 GBP) which was about 25 percent less than the introductory pricing on the DVJ-X1.

=== CDJ-400 ===
The CDJ-400 was released in the late 2007. It was similar in size to the CDJ-200, but came with scratching abilities and effects, as well as being Pioneer's first model to have a USB input. This made it possible to play MP3 music from a USB memory stick.

On the back of the CDJ-400 was another USB connector that could be used to connect the CDJ-400 to a computer. This enabled the MIDI control possibilities so the player could be used to control various types of DJ mix software. The CDJ-400 had a built in USB sound card.

=== MEP-7000 ===
The MEP-7000 was Pioneer's addition to their product range for professional DJs released in late 2007. At The 2008 NAMM Show The MEP-7000 was featured along with Pioneer's DJM-3000 19" rackmount DJ mixer. In Australia, the DJM-3000 had been discontinued for sale in late 2006 but was re-released in June 2008 just for the MEP-7000. The player was a 19" rack mountable twin player type capable of playing media formats ranging from normal audio CD/CD-R/CD-RW to digital data files in MP3- and AAC-formats written on DVD's as well as USB-connected memorysticks and/or portable hard drives.

=== CDJ-900 ===
The Pioneer CDJ-900 was announced simultaneously with Pioneer CDJ-2000 on September 17, 2009. The player had been available since the end of December 2009.

The CDJ-900 was placed below the Pioneer CDJ-2000, but above the later-released Pioneer CDJ-850 and Pioneer CDJ-350. It included features on the Pioneer CDJ-2000 including a tilted screen, Pioneer's Pro DJ link, and Serato HID mode support. Features that set it apart from the Pioneer CDJ-850 included a larger screen with dedicated playback and browse screens, quantize, and .5 frame step.

A unique feature was the inclusion of "slip" mode. This was not included on the Pioneer CDJ-2000, Pioneer CDJ-850, or the Pioneer CDJ-350. This allowed DJ's to manipulate the track and for it to return to where it should have been if the track had not been manipulated. If a loop was enabled at 02sec, for example, and leave it for 1 minute, this would then disengage the loop, jumping to 1:02 as if the user had never engaged the loop.

This CDJ allowed playback from USB drives, Audio CD, MP3 CD, act as a MIDI controller, and was a Serato accessory for HID playback. HID playback allowed the CDJ-900 as a controller for the computer program Serato, but at a much higher resolution than MIDI, and have access to all the features of the CDJ-900.

=== CDJ-2000 ===
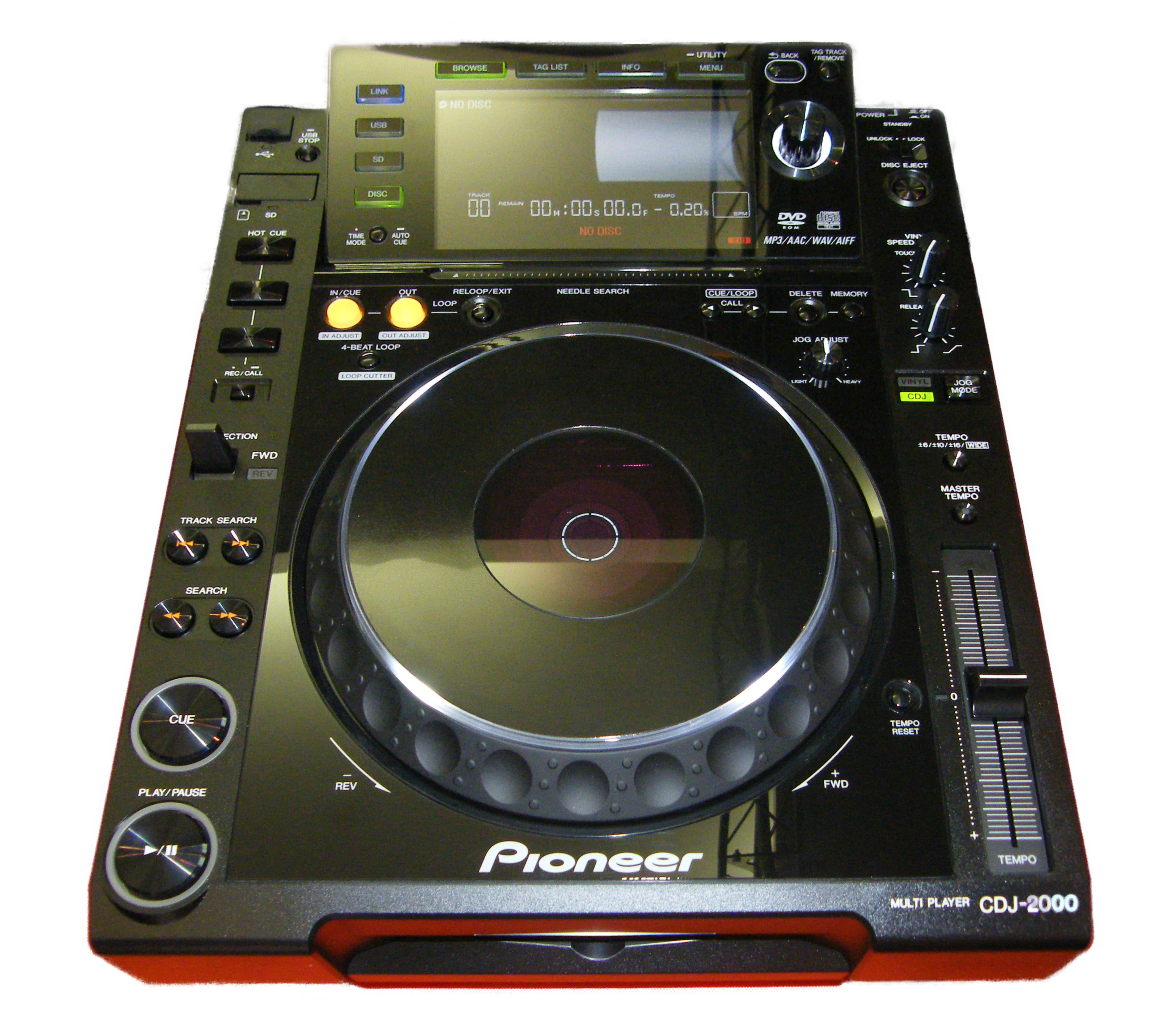
CDJ-2000

The Pioneer CDJ-2000 was introduced into the CDJ-range of digital turntables targeted for professional DJs simultaneously with the CDJ-900 on September 17, 2009. It became available late December 2009.

The Pioneer CDJ-2000 was the replacement for the Pioneer CDJ-1000 MK3.

=== CDJ-900 NXS ===
An update to the 900 was introduced at the end of 2013 which combined the classic features of the 900, such as CD usage, with more up-to-date features such as brighter screens, and new performance features.

== 2010s ==
=== CDJ-850 ===
Replacing the CDJ-800MK2, the CDJ-850 was released in 2010 offering some major enhancements over its predecessor. This deck was designed to feel and function like a CDJ-900 or CDJ-2000 and is rekordbox enabled, while maintaining an affordable price. As compared to the CDJ-900's tracking accuracy of 1ms, however, the CDJ-850 had accuracy of only 1 frame (13ms), which could make seamless looping impossible without constant adjustments. Also the CDJ-850 had USB functionality with rekordbox capability.

=== CDJ-350 ===
Released in July 2010 was released as a consumer friendly CDJ, features included a playlist button, manual and automatic loops options, a vinyl mode for scratching, tempo adjuster, and a Master Tempo button that changed the pitch of the song when disengaged. It was capable of using USB thumb drives and CDs, and could also be used as a MIDI controller.

=== CDJ-2000NXS ===
The Pioneer CDJ-2000 was discontinued to the end of 2012 and was replaced with the Pioneer CDJ-2000 Nexus Released in September 2012. New features included a high resolution screen which displays detailed wave form information as well as Beat-Sync which allows DJ's to automatically beat-match tracks from 2, 3 or 4 players via ProDJLink. The Pioneer CDJ-2000 Nexus was also the first CDJ to allow playback of music stored on a smartphone or tablet via Wi-Fi/USB connection.

The Pioneer CDJ-2000 Nexus was discontinued at the beginning of 2016, and was replaced by the CDJ-2000NXS2, released in February 2016.

=== CDJ-2000NXS2 ===
In early 2016, Pioneer unveiled a newer model of its flagship CDJ range: the CDJ-2000NXS2. Containing a high definition 7" touchscreen, eight hot cues, as well as several other features, the CDJ-2000NXS2 was met with much success and praise. CDJ-2000NXS2 was the first Pioneer flagship DJ-player that supported FLAC file format. It was also the first of the CDJ lineup to support external peripherals such as the DDJ-SP1, DDJ-XP1 and DDJ-XP2. The use of an "Add-On" controller was most notable with instant access to all 8 hot cues. With the advent of the CDJ-3000, it would be the last flagship CDJ to support Compact Discs.

== 2020s ==
=== CDJ-3000 ===
In late 2020, Pioneer released the CDJ-3000. Unlike previous models of CDJ, the CDJ-3000 has no CD drive, making it similar to Pioneer's XDJ line of DJ media players such as the XDJ-1000MK2 which lacked CD drives. The CDJ-3000 introduced a larger 9" touchscreen, a rearranged interface with more hot cue buttons (but the same eight hot cues as available on the CDJ-2000NXS2), more loop and beat jump buttons, and an LCD screen in the middle of the jog wheel.

CDJ-3000 supports FAT, FAT32, exFAT, and HFS+ file systems, but does not support NTFS or macOS GUID partitioning. FAT or FAT32 is required when flashing the firmware.

CDJ-3000 supports streaming music from Beatport (through StreamingDirectPlay, with a subscription from Beatport) and accessing personal music stored on Dropbox or Google Drive (through CloudDirectPlay, with a subscription to Rekordbox Cloud Library Sync).

=== CDJ-3000X ===
In September 2025, AlphaTheta (previously Pioneer DJ) released the CDJ-3000X, an enhanced version of the CDJ-3000. The CDJ-3000X adds a 10.1" capacitive touchscreen, built-in Wi-Fi, a NFC touchpoint for pairing with smartphones, new cue functions such as Touch Cue and Gate Cue, and reinforced play and cue buttons. The SD card slot was replaced with a USB-C port.

=== CDJ-1500X ===
In July 2026, AlphaTheta released the CDJ-1500X, a compact standalone DJ player positioned as a more affordable and space efficient counterpart to the CDJ-3000X. Alongside the release, AlphaTheta introduced CoBeat, an audience request system in which the DJ sees what the audience requested directly on the CDJ.
