= Battle Records =

Battle Records may refer to

- Battle records, a type of record used by DJs consisting of music samples
- Battle Records (record label), a record label active in the 1950s and 1960s
