= Stanton Magnetics =

Business unit of inMusic Brands

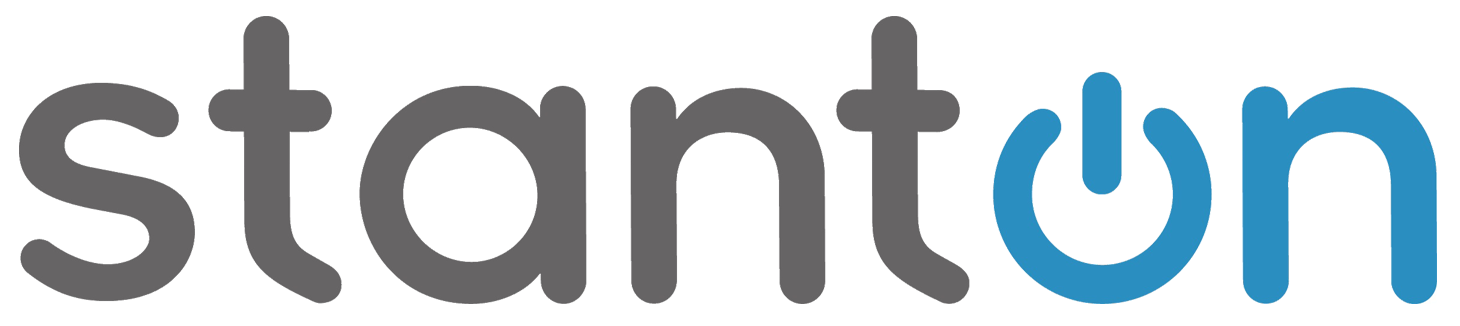
- Industry: Electronics
- Founded: 1946; 80 years ago
- Headquarters: Deerfield Beach, Florida, United States
- Products: Turntables, Cartridges, DJ mixers, DJ media players, DJ controllers
- Parent: inMusic Brands
- Website: StantonDJ.com

Stanton Magnetics, doing business as Stanton, is a business unit of inMusic Brands that designs and markets turntables, cartridges, DJ mixers, DJ media players, and DJ controllers.

== History ==
Stanton Magnetics was founded in 1946 by Norman C. Pickering as Pickering Associates, Inc., the parent corporation of Pickering & Company, with a focus on products for the professional broadcast and recording industries. Walter O. Stanton joined the company as vice president in charge of sales in 1948, helping the company develop the first cartridge for the new microgroove standard for vinyl records, and succeeded Pickering as president in 1950. In 1961, recognizing the growth of Pickering & Company's consumer market, Stanton established the Stanton Magnetics brand to focus on professional broadcast and recording products.

Beginning with the first microgroove phono cartridge, then with the first user-replaceable stylus in 1954 and the first stereo cartridge in 1958, Stanton was well-positioned to meet the demands of the hi-fi market and the advent of the 33⅓ rpm Long Play (LP) microgroove vinyl record

In 1970, Stanton introduced the 500AL, a cartridge specifically designed to withstand the back-cueing technique of radio disc jockeys, which led to it becoming a popular cartridge choice for mixing and scratching by the growing number of hip hop and club DJs. Stanton's product offering at the time included a wide range of cartridges, replacement styli, headphones, and a phono preamp.

In the late 1980s and early 1990s the Stanton 500AL cartridge found a new market as hip-hop DJs, club DJs, and turntablists chose it for its durability and reliable tracking. A-Trak and DJ Craze both used Stanton cartridges in DMC World DJ Championships wins.

Beginning in the late 1990s Stanton further expanded its product offering, expanding into DJ mixers, turntables, and CDJs.

In the early 2000s, Stanton helped pioneer Digital Vinyl Systems (DVS) through its involvement with Dutch company 'N2IT'. N2IT, with initial input from Richie Hawtin (aka Plastikman) and John Acquaviva, developed Final Scratch, software for manipulation of digital audio files using a turntable and a special vinyl record. In January, 2002 FinalScratch was released as a Stanton-branded product at the NAMM Show. Stanton Magnetics acquired FinalScratch from N2IT, and later partnered with Native Instruments, to bring the original BeOS-based software to a broader audience via Mac/PC platforms, with the relationship between Stanton and Native Instruments ending in 2006.

In December 2011, Gibson Brands, Inc. acquired Stanton as part of its acquisition of the Stanton Group, which also included Cerwin Vega and KRK Systems, creating a new division, Gibson Pro Audio.

In May 2020, inMusic Brands acquired Stanton from Gibson Brands.

== Products ==
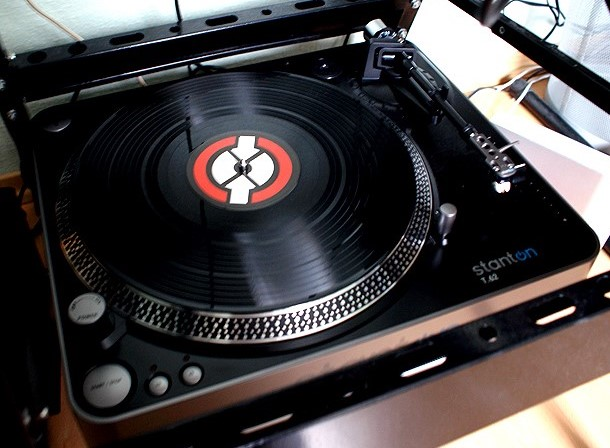
Stanton DJ turntable T62

Stanton produces a range of turntables for DJs. Some direct-drive models include features such as high torque motor (up to 4.5 kgf·cm), reversible platter rotation direction, line level outputs and audio signal processing. The Stanton 500 series is the most popular and enduring line of Stanton magnetic cartridges. The company's products also include CD players, DJ mixers, DJ MIDI controllers and DJ accessories,.

Stanton's line of controllers is referred to as SC controllers. The SCS.1M and SCS.1D make up the SC 1 system. The SCS.1D is a scratch turntable controller that uses a 10" vinyl disc with a direct drive motor. The SCS.1M is a 4 channel mixer with on-board audio card that connects via FireWire to a PC or Mac. The SCS.3m and two SCS.3d's make up the SCS.3 system. The SCS.3 system is entirely touch controlled which allows for more versatile control over your software. The SCS.3d is the "turntable" controller that uses a platter like touch pad, 6 touch buttons, 2 touch sensitive slides, and 4 soft buttons. The SCS.3m has 3 touch slides for each deck's EQ, two gain slides along with a crossfader slide.

Stanton's first stand-alone controller is the SCS.4DJ. This controller is an all-in-one package that allows virtual DJs to perform without a computer.

== See also ==
- List of phonograph manufacturers
