= Mixxx =

Open-source virtual DJ software

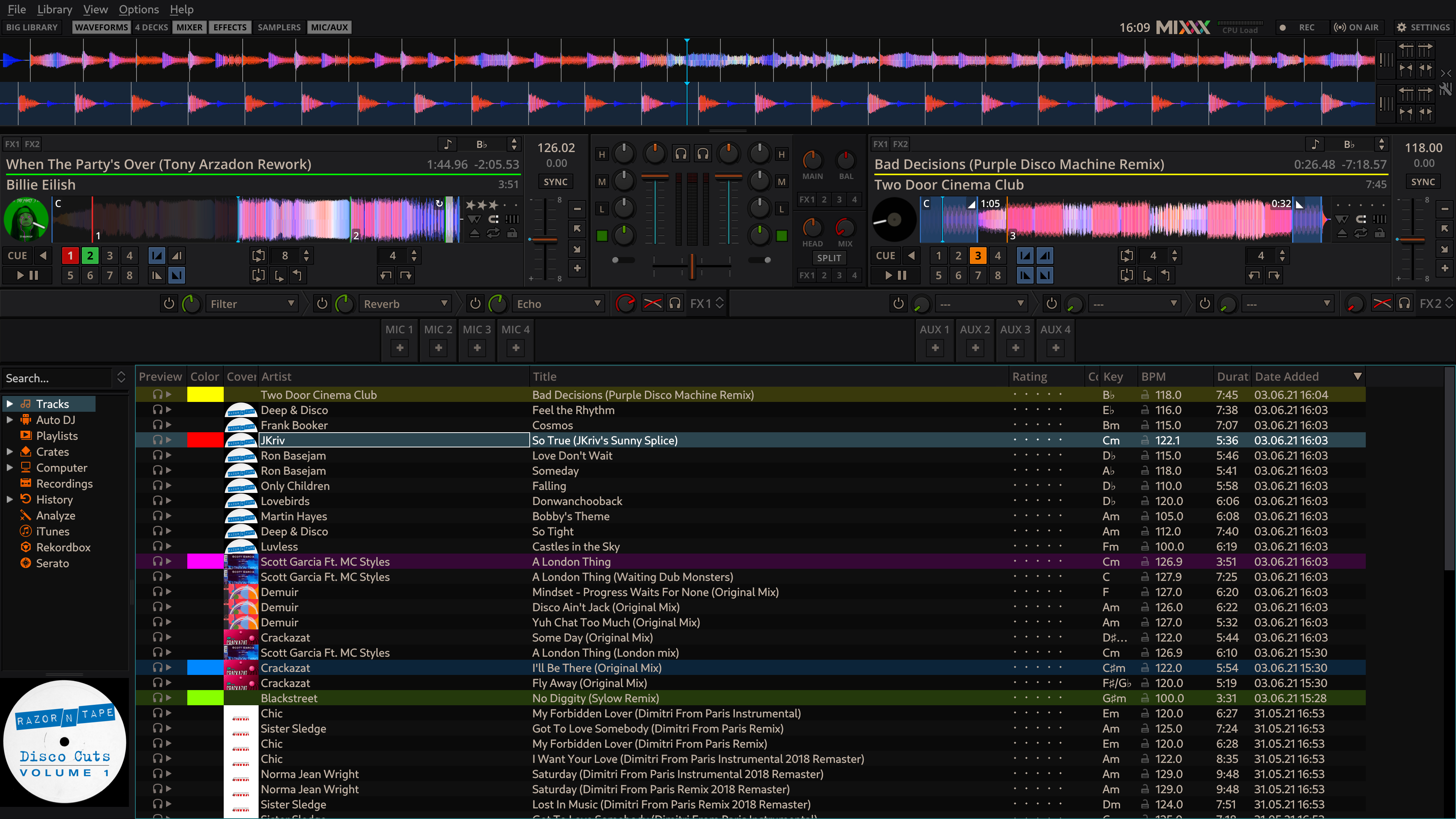
- A screenshot of Mixxx
- Developer(s): RJ Ryan, Owen Williams, Sean Pappalardo, Daniel Schürmann, S. Brandt, Nicu Badescu, Uwe Klotz, Be, Sébastien Blaisot, ronso0, Jan Holthuis
- Initial release: 2001; 24 years ago
- Stable release: 2.5.3 / 2 September 2025; 27 days ago
- Repository: github.com/mixxxdj/mixxx
- Written in: C++, JavaScript, C
- Operating system: Windows, macOS, Linux, Haiku
- Available in: 23 languages
- Type: DJ mixing
- License: GPL-2.0-or-later
- Website: www.mixxx.org

Mixxx is free and open-source software for DJing. It is cross-platform and supports most common music file formats. Mixxx can be controlled with MIDI and HID controllers and timecode vinyl records in addition to computer keyboards and mice.

== Overview ==
Mixxx is a DJ Automation and digital DJ performance application and includes many features common to digital DJ solutions as well as some unique ones: It natively supports advanced MIDI and HID DJ controllers, is licensed under the GPL-2.0-or-later and runs on all major desktop operating systems. The project was started in early 2001 for a doctoral thesis as one of the first digital DJing systems. Over 1,000,000 downloads of the program occur annually and as of Mixxx 1.10.0, 100 developers and artists have helped create Mixxx. Recent versions support harmonic mixing and beatmatching, both manually and automatically.

=== Format support ===
Mixxx can read most popular audio formats, including MP3, Vorbis, Opus, AIFF and FLAC. v1.8 introduces a plug-in system to be able to read other formats, including patent-encumbered ones whose decoders cannot legally be distributed in binary form with Mixxx, such as Advanced Audio Coding (AAC). Any such plug-ins are automatically loaded at run-time if present. Mixxx can also play module files when compiled with the modplug=1 build flag, and can use LV2 plugins for effects.

=== Hardware ===
Any sound card that is supported by the operating system is usable in Mixxx. Mixxx supports various software APIs for using sound cards on different operating systems, namely ASIO, WASAPI, and DirectSound on Windows; OSS, ALSA, and JACK on Linux; and CoreAudio on Mac OS X, all via PortAudio.

For external hardware control, Mixxx can support any MIDI or HID controller as long as there is a mapping to tell Mixxx how to interpret the controller's signals. Mixxx includes mappings for many DJ controllers and users can create their own mappings as well. It is the only DJ software capable of using a fully featured programming language, JavaScript, for creating mappings with advanced controller interaction and feedback.

Turntables and CDJ media players can control Mixxx with the timecode control sub-system which is built on xwax. Like xwax, Mixxx supports timecode vinyl made by several manufacturers.

== Reception ==
One of the free and open-source applications available in the Mac App Store, in less than 48 hours from debut in February 2011, Mixxx became the #1 Top Free App in the USA, Germany, and Italy.

Mixxx has been accepted as a mentoring organization in Google Summer of Code 2007–2008, 2010–2014, 2016–2018, and 2020.

== See also ==
- List of free software for audio
