= Crab (scratch) =

Type of scratch in turntablism

A crab is a type of scratch used by turntablists, combining hand movements on a turntable with rapid manipulation of the crossfader. This technique enables the creation of multiple, rapid sound variations, producing a unique stutter sound that blends audio and silence, giving it an almost robotic quality.

== Origin ==
The crab scratch was invented by DJ Qbert in Japan, later refined in San Francisco and showcased during the "Famous Warehouse Session" at the DMC USA finals in 1995. This session featured influential DJs including The Beat Junkies, The X-ecutioners, and ISP.

The name "crab" originated from a humorous mispronunciation of "crepes" during Qbert's visit to Beirut, which he and Mixmaster Mike found amusing and adopted for the scratch.

== Technique ==
To perform a crab scratch, the DJ taps the fader with three or four fingers in sequence, from pinkie to index, while the thumb provides resistance, pushing the fader back to its starting position after each tap. This creates a rapid series of sounds. The technique is adaptable, with some DJs preferring to use two or three fingers for greater control and less strain.

Practicing the crab scratch involves precise timing and control, typically visualized as 16th notes to aid rhythm and coordination. This scratch is known for its complexity and requires significant practice to master, especially to produce clean, distinct sounds.
