= DJ controller =

Type of music controller

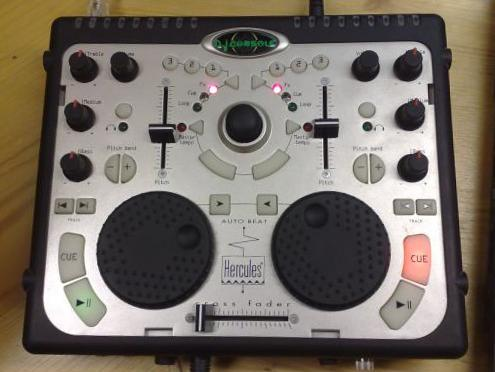
The Hercules DJ Console, one of the first DJ controllers ever made.

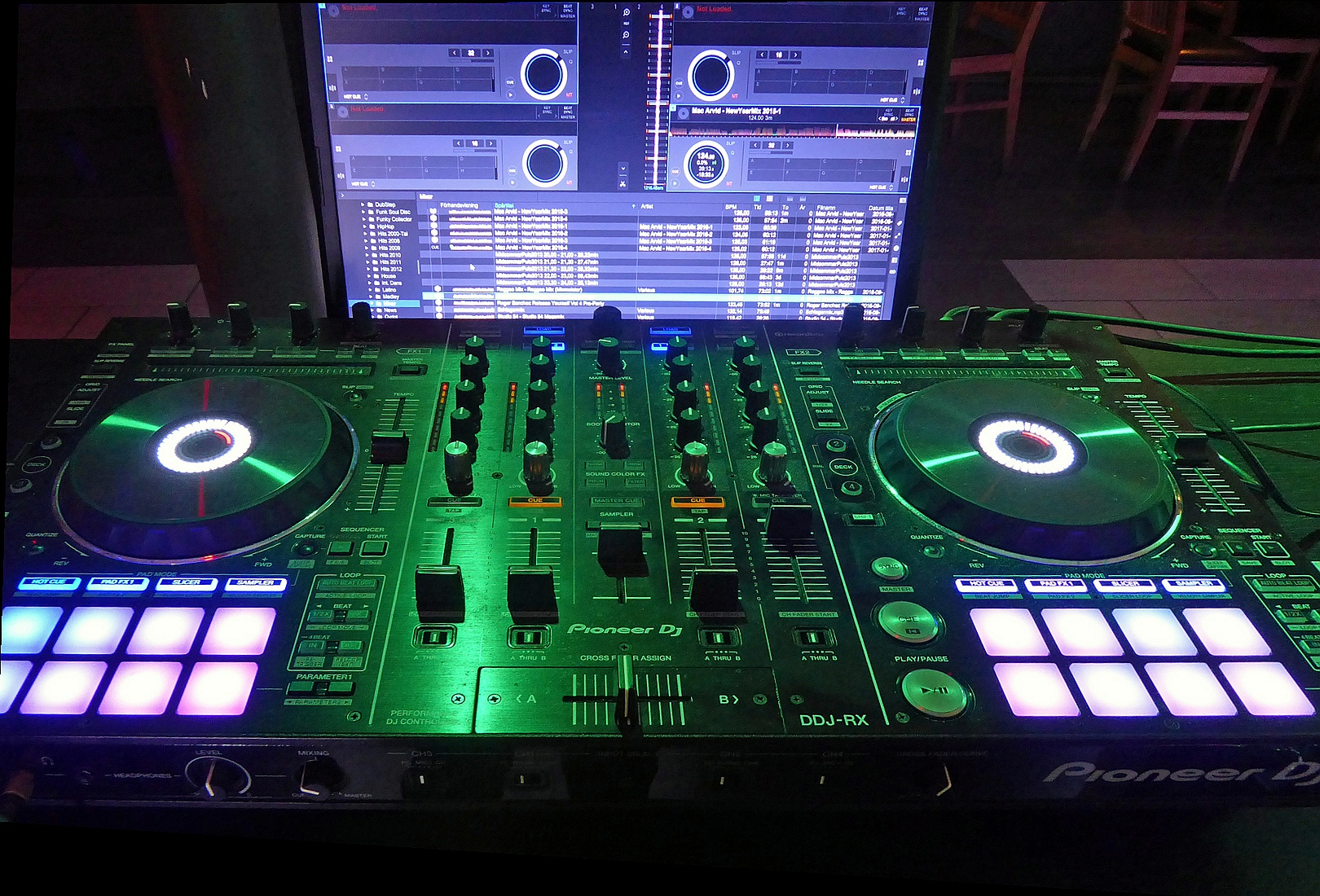
DJ Controller Pioneer DDJ-RX (launched 2015) with the mixing software Rekordbox, which comes packaged with many Pioneer products, running on a computer

DJ controllers are devices used to help DJs mix music with DJ software using knobs, encoders, jog wheels, faders, backlit buttons, touch strips, and other components.

== Overview ==
DJ controllers are microprocessor-based control surfaces used to provide easier and more precise control of the software than the computer keyboard and touchpad on a laptop, or the touchscreen on tablet computers and smartphones. They do not mix audio signals like DJ mixers; rather, they send signals to a computer to tell the DJ software running on the computer how to mix audio. Many DJ controllers also have a built in sound card with 4 output channels (2 stereo pairs), which allows the DJ to preview music in headphones before playing it on the main output. Most DJ controllers use the standard MIDI or HID protocols to communicate with the computer via USB.

Modern DJ controllers emulate two turntables/CDJs and a DJ mixer but are much less expensive. Indeed, the average price of a DJ controller is around $800. Unlike turntables, controllers can take advantage of the flexibility of computer software, for example, by allowing the DJ to store multiple cue points with music files. Also, DJ software allows users to remap the components of controllers to perform different functions than the controller manufacturer intended.

Some DJ controllers break from the conventional two jog wheels and a mixer layout and are designed to be easily mapped however the user wants. Some controllers are designed to be used either for live PA performances with software such as Ableton Live or with DJ software. A few DJ controllers, most notably the Novation Dicers, are designed to be used with timecode vinyl. Many of the DJ controllers that can be used with timecode vinyl can also be used as MIDI devices, or even as standalone devices.

DJ controllers are usually designed to work with DJ software programs endorsed by the manufacturer of the controller. Most controllers use the standard MIDI or HID protocols, so other software can usually be made to work with them. However, it may take considerable effort to get a controller to work with software it was not designed for, and some controls may not make sense with other software. Common DJ software used with DJ controllers include Serato, VirtualDJ, Traktor, Djay, and Rekordbox.

DJ controllers have gradually become as powerful as professional media players and mixers, including effects, LCD screens, and touch-sensitive performance pads. Modern DJ controllers usually include drum pads and fader tempo controls; they may also include motorized platters.

== History ==
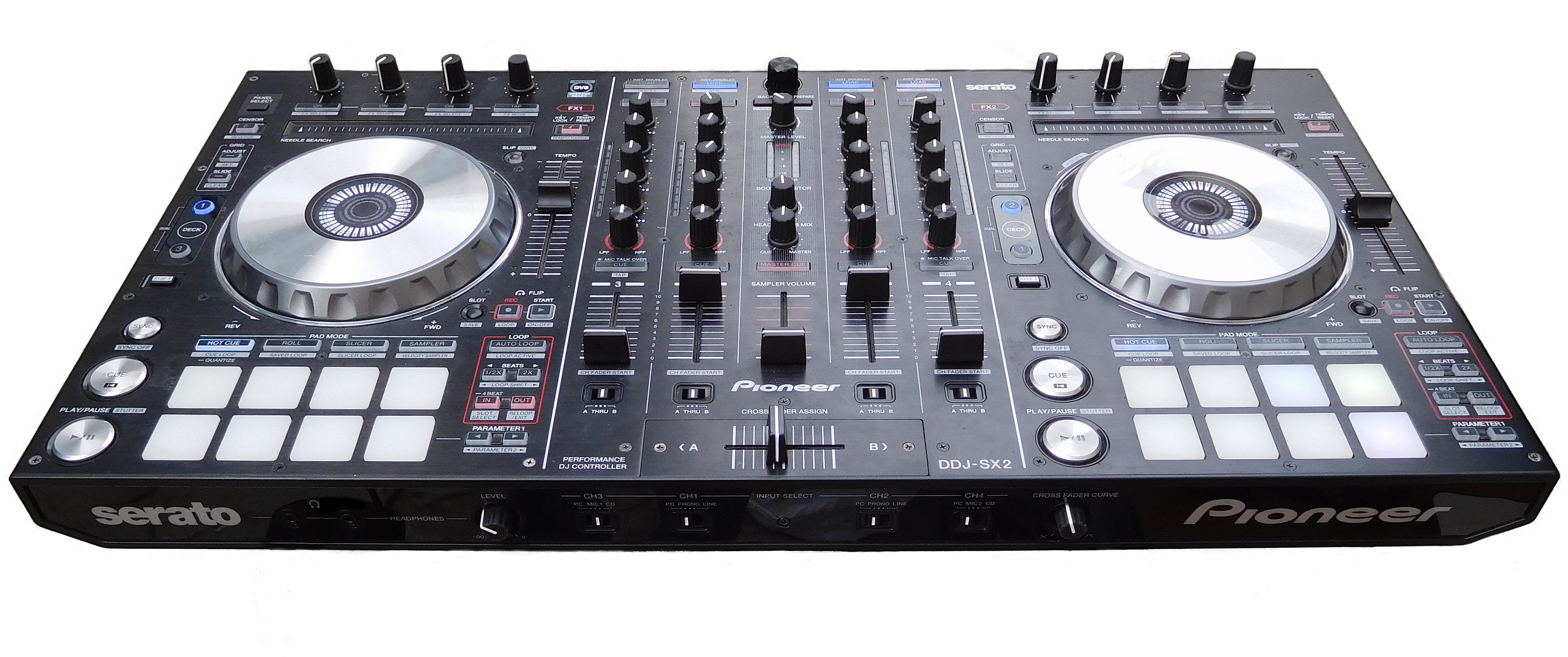
Pioneer DJ-Controller DDJ-SX2, 2014

Early examples of DJ controllers include the Hercules DJ Console released by Guillemot Corporation in 2004, which features a 6 channel soundcard with S/PDIF and MIDI ports, traditional mixer-style faders, crossfader and EQs, jog wheels and CD DJ style button controls. In 2007, Vestax produced a controller specifically designed for DJing, the VCI-100, that emulated two turntables and a DJ mixer setup and was built with quality components acceptable to DJs. Many manufacturers saw the success of the VCI-100 and started selling their own similar devices. Unlike the original VCI-100, some of those devices had integrated sound cards.

In 2009, Pioneer DJ produced new models of their popular CDJ media players, the CDJ-2000 and CDJ-900, that could also be used as controllers to control DJ software via HID. This way, CDJs can be used to control DJ software without playing a timecode signal into a sound card. Aside from their CDJ players, in 2011 Pioneer DJ has released their first two DJ controllers: the DDJ-S1 (compatible with Serato) and the DDJ-T1 (compatible with Traktor). Throughout the next decade up until today, Pioneer DJ has released over 40 different DJ controller models including fully standalone devices, making it one of the leading brands in the DJ equipment market.

In 2010, Native Instruments released the Traktor Kontrol S4, which used high resolution jog wheels and a proprietary protocol rather than MIDI to achieve better performance of the jog wheels. The Mk2 of the Kontrol S4, released in 2013, uses standard HID signals rather than a proprietary protocol to communicate with the computer.

Among other popular brands producing and distributing DJ controllers today are Numark DJ, Hercules DJ, Pioneer DJ/AlphaTheta, and Denon.

As of 2023, DJ controllers with motorized jogwheels have entered the market, better replicating the feel of traditional turntables. Brands producing these controllers include Hercules and Rane. Standalone controllers have also proliferated, with some brands including batteries and built-in speakers to maximize portability. Some controllers also have dedicated buttons for cutting edge features, such as real-time stem separation which can selectively mix song elements such as instruments, vocals, and drums, allowing DJs to, for example, play instrumental and a cappella versions of tracks or create instant mashups.

== See also ==
- Controllerism
