= Sander Kleinenberg =

Dutch DJ

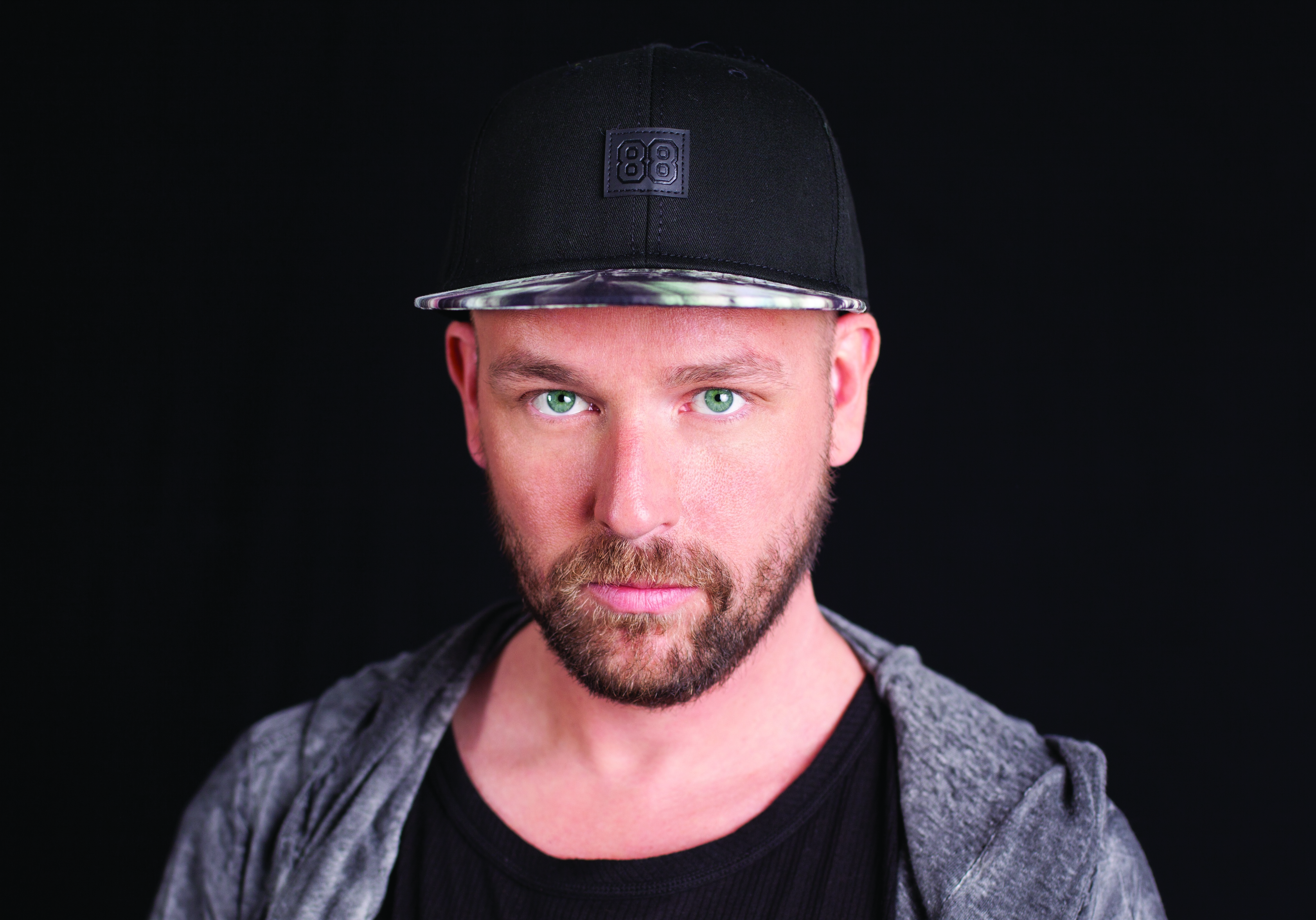

Background information
- Also known as: Free Frogs, S 'N' S
- Born: 29 December 1971 (age 54); Delft, Netherlands
- Origin: The Hague, Netherlands
- Genres: House, trance
- Occupations: Disc jockey, record producer, DVJ
- Instruments: DVJ1000, synthesizers
- Years active: 1997–present
- Labels: Little Mountain, This Is, Thrive, FFRR, Ultra, Spinnin'
- Website: SanderKleinenberg.com

Sander Kleinenberg (Dutch pronunciation: [ˈsɑndər ˈklɛinə(m)ˌbɛr(ə)x]; born 29 December 1971) is a Dutch disc jockey, VDJ, and record producer. He founded and runs Little Mountain Recordings and THIS IS Recordings. Kleinenberg is well known for his use of digital video in concerts, his "Everybody" and This Is brands of club nights and albums and his 2000 single "My Lexicon" as well as hits like "The Fruit" and "This Is Miami".

== Music career ==
Sander Kleinenberg began DJing at a local bar in 1987 at the age of 15, playing a variety of music including rock and dance music. After sending demos to many European record labels, Kleinenberg released his first single "Bombay" in 1993 on Belgian record label Wonka Beats under the artist name Free Frogs, a collaboration with several friends. The next year, he released a single on German record label Superstition. In 1996, Kleinenberg released "YDW (You Do Me Wrong)" under the moniker S 'N' S on the Dutch record label Deal Records and licensed by Strictly Rhythm. His early influences included Mantronix, Shep Pettibone, and Depeche Mode. In 1999, Kleinenberg produced the first part of his thematic 4 Seasons trilogy with second part the following in 2000, both on London's FFRR label. Kleinenberg was also becoming known worldwide with the release of his track "My Lexicon", which is now often considered a genre standard of progressive house. "My Lexicon" is well known for its catchy, trancey percussive melody and atmospheric chord stabs. "My Lexicon" and "Sacred" were both given a boost in popularity by their appearance on Sasha's Global Underground 013: Ibiza album. Kleinenberg was to join the Global Underground label the following year with his Nubreed 004 release.

In 2003, Sander Kleinenberg founded his record label Little Mountain Recordings. Its first release was the final part in Kleinenberg's 4 Seasons series, which had been pushed back due to, among other things, label changes. Kleinenberg described the final installment as "rougher around the edges" rather than having the trancey serenity of the first or the funkiness of the second. He also remixed Justin Timberlake's single "Rock Your Body", which garnered him the Best Remix award at the Dancestar USA Awards. Later in 2003, Kleinenberg kicked off the introduction of his "Everybody" brand with the album Renaissance: Everybody which featured a mixture of quirky disco, Detroit techno, and tech house. Kleinenberg described the concept of "Everybody" as "a reaction to how dance music began to take itself too seriously" and that he hopes to show that dance music can be fun. He followed Everybody up the next year with a sequel, This Is Everybody Too, which continued Kleinenberg's vein of "glitchy, low key techno".

In 2005, Kleinenberg began a monthly residency at Crobar, New York City, using it to push the "Everybody" brand. He also brought in Lee Burridge to Crobar and to work on the album This is Everybody! On Tour. Kleinenberg's performances at Crobar often featured appearances from young DJs, such as Desyn Masiello. Over his career, Kleinenberg's track selection shifted from the more "lush" sounds of progressive house to a funkier electro house vibe, though he prefers to define his genre simply as "house music". In 2004 he had released his track "The Fruit" and in 2006 he released "This is Miami"; both tracks reached a number one position in the ARIA chart. His "Everybody" brand has grown with the years and has changed to his current "This Is..." brand which was influenced by his song "This Is Miami", another version of the song which was used in the Sensation (event) is called, "This Is Sensation".

The This Is club brand held residencies in clubs like Avalon in Los Angeles, Discoteque in Moscow, Paradiso and Melkweg in Amsterdam, Red Light in Paris and Pacha in Ibiza

After years of intensive touring Sander Kleinenberg got back into the studio to deliver his debut album '5K' in 2010. The first single of this album was "Remember When", featuring UK singer/songwriter Jamie Cullum. Together with the release of the "5K" album and the "Remember When" single, Sander launched his new music label THIS IS Recordings.

In early 2012, Kleinenberg toured Lahore, Pakistan and performed in front of a large audience.

On December 1, 2014, he released his single "Can You Feel It" featuring Gwen McCrae. The single has been described as "a deep and soulful intervention in the Dutch maestro’s indie dance etiquette, held together with strong production values and an inherently intimate demeanor."

== Visuals and DVJing ==
Sander Kleinenberg is well known for his DVJing with self-created visuals and video usage in concerts. Kleinenberg explains his use of video saying that it allows for more variety among DJs and performances and that it makes concerts reflect life. Due to the complexity of mixing both audio and visual at concerts, Kleinenberg will use the club's on-site VJ or have his partner Mark Pistoire as a VJ at his concerts using the DVJ-X1 or the newer DVJ1000. Kleinenberg first met Pistoire in 2003 when searching for a VJ for his "Everybody" events and the two performed live together for the first time in The Hague. The in-concert imagery often includes political content or trippy home videos created by Pistoire or Kleinenberg.

== Discography ==
=== Studio albums ===
- 2000: Tranceglobal Airways (Mixmag)
- 2001: Nubreed 004 (Boxed)
- 2002: Sander Kleinenberg: Essential Mix (Warner)
- 2003: Renaissance: Everybody (Renaissance)
- 2004: This is Everybody Too (Renaissance) (Billboard Top Electronic Albums #11)
- 2005: This is Everybody! On Tour (Everybody Loves Music)
- 2007: This is... Sander Kleinenberg
- 2009: This is... Sander Kleinenberg 2
- 2010: Sander Kleinenberg Presents 5K
- 2012: Amnesia DJ Sessions Vol 8

=== Singles ===
- Bombay (1993) (as Free Frogs)
- Transporter (1994) (as Europe, with Raymond Heg and Kelvin Smits)
- Sander3 (1993) (as Sander)
- Sander4 (1994) (as Sander)
- Sander5 (1995) (as Sander)
- Time Fax (1995) (as Sakan, with Khalid Ouaziz)
- Clear Cut (1996) (as Rails Inc., with DJ Per)
- It Moves (1996) (as MTF, with Stef Vrolijk)
- Ydw (1996) (as S'n'S, with Stef Vrolijk and Axel Behrend)
- You Do Me Wrong (1996) (as Sander 'n' Stef, with Stef Vrolijk)
- Conflicts (1997) (as S'n'S, with Stef Vrolijk and Axel Behrend)
- Running (1997) (as MTF, with Stef Vrolijk)
- The Rhythm (1997)
- Bullets (1998) (as Mevrouw Spoelstra, with Stefan Brügesch)
- Dancin' (1998)
- Miks (1998) (as Fetzan)
- Save The Time (1998) (as Sander)
- Feelin' Good (1998)
- For Your Love (1998)
- 4 Seasons Ep 1-3 (1999)
- Airtight (1999) (with Steve Bug)
- Grand Bazaar (1999) (with Steve Bug)
- 4 Seasons EP 2-3 (2000)
- My Lexicon (2000)
- Sacred (2000)
- Observator (2000)
- Penso Positivo EP (2000)
- 4 Seasons Part 3 (2003)
- Repeat to Specify' (2003)
- The Fruit (2004)
- My Lexicon (2006)
- This is Miami (2006)
- This Is Sensation (Anthem 2006) (2006)
- This is Our Night (2009)
- R.Y.A.N.L. (2010)
- M.A.N.I.A.C. (2010)
- Remember When (2010) (featuring Jamie Cullum)
- The Journey (2011) (with Kraak & Smaak and Ursula Rucker)
- The Healer (2011)
- Closer (2011) (with Neil Ormandy)
- Chemically (2011) (with Ryan Starr)
- We-R-Superstars (2014)
- Can You Feel It (2014)
- Wicked Things (2015)
- Feel Like Home (2016) (featuring DYSON)
- We Rock it (2016) (featuring Dev)
- Clarity (2016) (featuring Marseille)
- Midnight Lovers (2017) (featuring S.T.R.Y.D.E.R)
- Colours in the Sun (2017) (fe
- London Girl (2018) (featuring Baby Sol)

==== Charted singles ====
List of charted singles, with selected chart positions
Title	Year	Peak chart positions
Title	Year	AUS
"The Fruit"	2005	94

=== Remixes ===
- 1995: Art of Silence - "West 4"
- 1994: Amazone - Sangel
- 1995: Amazone - "Demons"
- 1997: Eye 'N Ear - "Movin' On"
- 1999: Vincent de Moor - "Between 2 Fires"
- 1999: Holloway & Co. - "Make You Mine"
- 1999: Junkie XL - "Check Your Basic Groove"
- 2000: Ashtrax - "Helsinki"
- 2000: Frankie Goes to Hollywood - "Welcome To The Pleasuredome"
- 2000: Ben Shaw - "So Strong"
- 2000: Oliver Lieb - "Subraumstimulation"
- 2001: Breeder - "New York FM"
- 2001: Sasha & Darren Emerson - "Scorchio"
- 2001: PMT - "Deeper Water"
- 2001: Röyksopp - "Poor Leno"
- 2001: System F - "Exhale"
- 2002: Lamya - "Empires (Bring Me Men)"
- 2002: Lexicon Avenue - "From Dusk Till Dawn"
- 2003: Annie Lennox - "Wonderful"
- 2003: Justin Timberlake - "Rock Your Body"
- 2003: Junkie XL - "Don't Wake Up Policeman"
- 2003: BT - "Somnambulist"
- 2003: Spork - "Freek Like Me"
- 2004: N*E*R*D - "Maybe"
- 2004: Janet Jackson - "All Nite (Don't Stop)"
- 2005: Usher - "Caught Up"
- 2005: Kane - "Something to Say"
- 2005: Eurythmics - "I've Got a Life"
- 2006: Mylo - "Muscle Car"
- 2010: Lifelike - "Love Emulator"

| width="50%" valign="top" |

- 2010: Kraak & Smaak - "Dynamite"
- 2010: DEV ft. The Cataracs - "Bass Down Low"
- 2011: Katy Perry - "T.G.I.F."
- 2011: Other Lives - "For 12"
- 2011: Kraak & Smaak - "Dynamite
- 2011: Daft Punk - "TRON Legacy (End Titles)"
- 2011: Blush ft. Snoop Dogg - "Undivided"
- 2011: Manufactured Superstars - "Drunk Text"
- 2011: Innerpartysystem - "Not Getting Any Better"
- 2012: Go Back to the Zoo - "Fire In The Streets"
- 2013: Kraak & Smaak - "Hit The Club"
- 2013: Robin Thicke - "Give It 2"
- 2013: Ilse Delange - "Blue Bittersweet"
- 2014: Dino Lenny - "I'm Coming Home"
- 2014: Lany - "ILYSB"
- 2014: Jamie Cullum - "Everything You Didn't Do"
- 2015: Halsey - "Trouble (Stripped)"
- 2015: Madonna - "Bitch I'm Madonna" ft. Nicki Minaj
- 2016: The Weeknd - "Starboy" ft. Daft Punk
- 2016: Tom Zanetti - "Darlin'"
- 2017: James Vincent McMorrow - "Get Low"

S'N'S Remixes

- 1996: M.T.F. - "It Moves"
- 1997: Mr. S Oliver - "Funkin' Down The Track"
- 1996: Rainbow - "Seed, Scattered"
- 1997: 2B Continued - "Laydown (I Feel U)"
- 1997: Flamman & Abraxas - "Rubb It In"
- 1997: Kinky Bros. - "Hot"
- 1998: King Dale - "Bonus"
- 1998: Vincent de Moor - "Orion City"
- 1999: Three Drives on a Vinyl - "Greece 2000"

|}

=== Mixtapes ===
- 2015: The Deepest Mixtape in the Universe #1
- 2016: The Deepest Mixtape in the Universe #2
- 2016: The Deepest Mixtape in the Universe #3
- 2016: The Deepest Mixtape in the Universe #4
- 2016: The Deepest Mixtape in the Universe (Miami Edition) #5
- 2016: The Deepest Mixtape in the Universe #6
- 2016: The Deepest Mixtape in the Universe #7
- 2016: The Deepest Mixtape in the Universe #8
- 2017: The Deepest Mixtape in the Universe (Ade Edition) #9
- 2017: The Deepest Mixtape in the Universe #10
- 2017: The Deepest Christmas Mixtape in the Universe
- 2017: The Deepest Mixtape in the Universe #12
- 2017: The Deepest Mixtape in the Universe #13
- 2017: The Deepest Mixtape in the Universe #14
- 2017: The Deepest Mixtape in the Universe #15
- 2017: The Deepest Mixtape in the Universe #16
- 2018: The Deepest Mixtape in the Universe #17
- 2018: The Deepest Mixtape in the Universe #18
- 2018: The Deepest Mixtape in the Universe #19
- 2018: The Deepest Mixtape in the Universe #20
- 2018: The Deepest Mixtape in the Universe (Roadtrip to Coachella) #21
- 2018: The Deepest Mixtape in the Universe #22
- 2018: The Deepest Mixtape in the Universe #23
- 2018: The Deepest Mixtape in the Universe #24
- 2018: The Deepest Mixtape in the Universe #25
- 2019: The Deepest Mixtape in the Universe #26
- 2019: The Deepest Mixtape in the Universe #27
- 2019: The Deepest Mixtape in the Universe #28
- 2019: The Deepest Mixtape in the Universe #29
- 2019: The Deepest Mixtape in the Universe (Roadtrip to Coachella) #30
- 2019: The Deepest Mixtape in the Universe #31
- 2019: The Deepest Mixtape in the Universe #32
- 2019: The Deepest Mixtape in the Universe #33
