= Digital DJ licensing =

Type of music licence

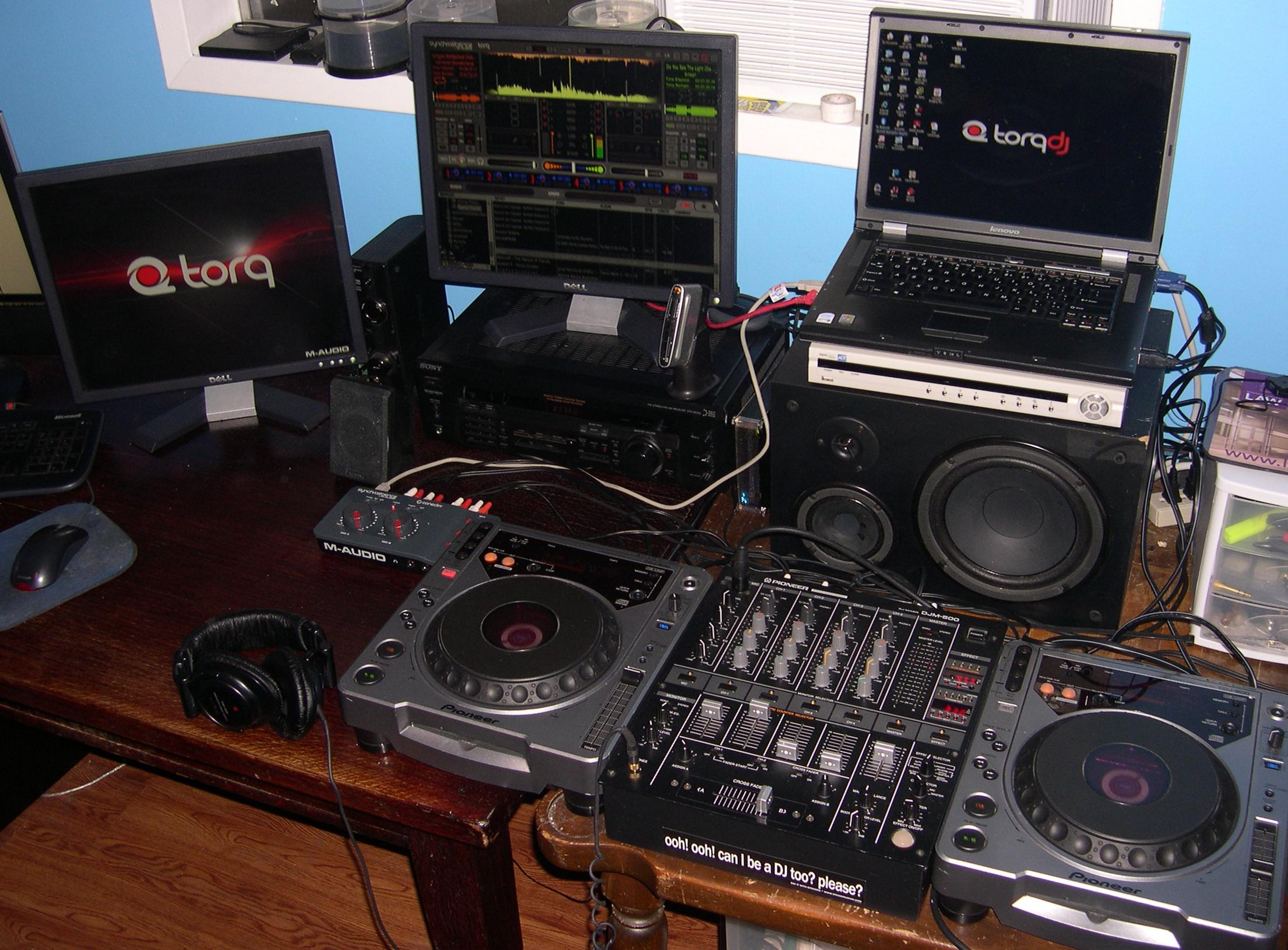
A vinyl emulation software setup, for the use of which a digital DJ licence is required in some countries if used publicly.

A digital DJ licence is required in some countries, including the United Kingdom (with exceptions), Finland, Belgium and Italy, to publicly play digital copies of copyrighted music. The licence allows a DJ to copy music from original CDs, vinyl or other media, to a computer's hard drive, an MP3 player or other digital audio players, for example to be used with a vinyl emulation software program, or in some cases to other digital media, such as CD-R or MiniDisc. In the countries where digital DJ licensing is used, the licence is also required for playing music originally bought and downloaded directly on to a computer, usually in MP3 or similar format, unless the licence of the online music store explicitly allows the public performance of the downloaded tracks.

== Reasons for licensing ==
The licence usually has two separate functions: To allow a DJ to copy and digitise music from other sources to a computer's hard drive, and to allow playing of music bought from an online music store. In the first case, a licence is needed because a copy of the original recording is used, and in the second, because the copyright collecting agencies of the countries which require licensing hold, that music bought from online music stores such as iTunes or Beatport requires additional licensing before it can be played publicly, thus making downloaded music not comparable to CDs and vinyl, which do not require an additional licence on the DJ's part to be played, as the venue where the music is played usually pays for a music licence which allows recorded music to be played. The reasoning for this is that music from online music stores is usually licensed solely for private use.

The licensing systems are emerging since DJs have started to transfer their music collections on to laptops for use with vinyl emulation software or other DJing tools for various reasons, including reducing the amount of baggage, ease of searching, and the ability to have a much larger collection available than what would be practical if the music was stored on a larger physical media; and because the copyright laws in some countries do not permit the professional and/or public use of copies, even if copied from legitimate sources.

== Licensing by country ==
The need for a licence, the details of it, and the costs vary from country to country. The licence is usually issued by the national organisations which protect the intellectual properties of composers, lyricists, arrangers and performers; or by other organisations which are licensed to sell such licences on their behalf. Sometimes the licence takes the form of leasing, and needs to be renewed yearly, and the tracks used under the licence may not be used after the licence expires, unless a new licence is acquired. For example, in the UK the DJ is allowed to continue using the tracks copied under a previous licence even after the licence expires, while in Finland the tracks copied under licence must be deleted after expiry. Usually, the songs used do not have to be defined in advance. The songs used must be copied from legitimate sources, and it is not possible to legally play songs illegally downloaded, even if the DJ has a licence. It is not however always required for the DJ to own the original recording, and for example copying music from a CD borrowed from a library may be allowed, but this varies between countries, being for example allowed in Finland but prohibited in the UK. Another common element of the licences is that they are personal and non-transferable, and thus the copies may only be used by the person who originally acquired the licence, and can not be borrowed or rented to a third-party.

=== Licensing in the UK ===
In the UK, a licence must be obtained from the Phonographic Performance Limited (PPL), or one of its dubbing operators, and from the Mechanical-Copyright Protection Society (MCPS) if you are to DJ with their music.. DJing with copyleft and permissively licensed tracks is generally allowed without a licence from those. In 2006, The PPL created a licence that allowed a DJ to use up to 20,000 songs and keep backup copies of these on a separate hard drive. The licence did not allow the recording of live DJ mixes, or burning music on to a CD. Furthermore, editing or altering of the original recording was not permitted. The PPL licence had to be renewed yearly, and cost £200 plus value added tax (VAT) per year. PPL did not announce how the use of the digital DJ licensing was going to be enforced or supervised, other than by advertising the need for the licence and discouraging venues from hiring unlicensed DJs, under threat of "trouble with the law". In addition to this, the DJ also needed to acquire a separate licence from the MCPS.

In 2008, PPL and MCPS created a joined licence, named ProDub licence, which covers the licensing for both organisations. The new licensing scheme is tiered: tier 1 costing £250 including VAT, and allowing the copying of up to 5,000 songs, up to tier 4 which costs £400 including VAT and allows the copying of up to 20,000 songs. This licensing system differs from the previous one in that it's not a form of leasing, and the songs copied under this licence may be kept indefinitely. Furthermore, if the whole quota is not used, the remaining amount may be transferred to the next year, provided the licence is renewed. This licence also allows a backup to be kept, but does not permit the copying of music on to a CD-R, only allowing copies to hard drives of computers or other digital audio players. Also, it is required for the DJ to own the original media, and copies made from CDs borrowed from a library or another source are not allowed. The licensors keep a database searchable by surname to allow venues and other organisers to verify that their performers comply with the appropriate copyright laws. It should however be noted that DJs playing original CDs and vinyls are legally allowed to do so without any licences on their part, and are not listed in the database. MCPS does not require the licensees to report the songs used, but they are required to keep some form of a record of the copies made, that may be requested by the MCPS to be sent to them and/or allow them to verify the records. This form of licensing is similar to the previous model in the sense that it does not allow live DJ mixes to be recorded.

By itself the new licensing model does not allow the copying of karaoke tracks that include on-screen lyrics, but for an additional fee the coverage is extendable to include such tracks. The licence also only allows music to be copied in the UK, and if the music is copied in any other country, the DJ needs to acquire permission from the copyright holders, or acquire a similar licence from that country's copyright organisation(s). Music copied in the UK can however be played in any country within the European Economic Area without the need for additional licences or permissions.

=== Licensing in Finland ===
In Finland, a licence must be obtained from both Teosto and Gramex, the Finnish organisations which protect the intellectual properties of composers and performers, respectively. The costs vary based on the amount of digital copies desired. The total cost of both licences combined ranges from approximately €280 for 1-300 songs to €600 for up to 3,000 songs, prices including VAT. The licences from both Teosto and Gramex are valid for a year. The Finnish licensing system does not permit backup copies of any kind, and having two copies of any particular song is considered the same as having two different songs; thus, both are deducted from the amount allowed by the licence. The licence does not discern between different target mediums, and music may be copied to any format. Usage of the licence is enforced by random inspections by Teosto's inspectors. Punishments for lacking a licence range from warnings to fines and reimbursements to copyright holders. DJs in Finland using the licence are required by Teosto to submit reports of the songs used "upon request". Gramex does not require such reports for licences for fewer than 3,000 songs.

An alternative to a yearly leasing licence in Finland is to pay a one-time "re-mechanisation" fee per track, which allows tracks to be copied to CD-R or other such media, and used for as long as the media exists. Backups are not allowed, and should the disc be damaged the fee will have to be paid again if the licensee wishes to use the same tracks again. While this type of licensing is cheaper in the long run for acquiring a large song library, it does not have the flexibility of the leasing system.

== Criticism ==
The licensing system has been criticised by DJs as being unfair and overly expensive. The major points of criticism are the double charges for copying music from an original CD to a hard drive (first buying the CD and then paying for the licence to make a copy), and the unintuitive differentiating between downloaded music and music bought on a physical medium, since the reasoning for allowing the latter to be played, but not the former is that digital downloads are only licensed for private use, but this is also the case for most CDs. Why the venue's licence to play music covers the physical mediums but not digital ones is unclear.

== See also ==
- Vinyl emulation software
- Copyright collecting agency
- Performance rights organization

== Notes ==
1."The annual digital DJ licence ... will, for the first time, allow DJs legally to copy sound recordings onto a computer for use when DJing in clubs, pubs and other venues", from PPL launch digital DJ licence
2."DJ-toimintaa ammatikseen harjoittava henkilö voi tehdä Teosto/NCB:n kanssa vuosisopimuksen, joka kattaa Teosto/NCB:n edustaman musiikin luvallisen kopioimisen", translation: "A professional DJ may make an annual contract with Teosto/NCB, which will allow the legal copying of music represented by Teosto/NCB", from Teosto's licensing terms
3."This includes legally-purchased downloads, which are normally licensed only for personal use, as well as copies of tracks from records or CDs", from Digital DJs 'unaware of copy law'
4."All DJs (based in the UK and Channel Islands) who transfer their music collection from vinyl or CD to MP3 or other digital format must hold a valid ProDub licence", from Does Your DJ Require the MCPS-PRS ProDub Licence?
5."The licence will allow DJs to copy up to 20,000 tracks and will also allow DJs to keep a back up database of their digital copies on a separate computer", from PPL launch digital DJ licence
6."Venues would be urged to check DJs were licensed before hiring them and those who turned a blind eye could also find themselves in trouble with the law", from Digital DJs 'unaware of copy law'
7."When you purchase recordings, for example CDs from a record store or downloads from a legitimate online music service, you are only buying the right to listen to these recordings for private and domestic uses.", from ProDub FAQs
