= Rane Corporation =

American audio equipment manufacturer

RANE
- Company type: Pro Audio Manufacturer
- Industry: Audio
- Founded: 1981
- Founder: Linda Arink Chief Financial Officer Dennis Bohn Chief Technology Officer
- Headquarters: Mukilteo, Washington, United States
- Products: compressors, EQs, Active crossovers Mixing console
- Number of employees: 60
- Website: www.rane.com dj.rane.com

Rane Corporation is an American pro audio equipment manufacturer. Located in Mukilteo, Washington, it was made up of former employees of Phase Linear Corporation, and started out with products aimed at small live bands. They now carry many products.

They provide extensive technical documents about audio equipment setup and design, including proper grounding, interconnections, noise, measurement standards, a glossary of industry terms, and more.

In 2016, Rane Corporation was purchased by InMusic Brands

== See also ==
- Scratch Live
