= Battle record =

Component found in DJing and the remix culture

A battle record, also often called a battle tool or battle breaks, is a vinyl record made up of brief samples from songs, film dialogue, sound effects, and drum loops for use by a DJ. The samples and drum loops are used for scratching and performances by turntablists. The most famous example of this format is Super Duck Breaks, a 1996 release by "The Turntablist," a pseudonym of DJ Babu.

Battle records that get released to the general public are often made by DJs banking on their celebrity or looking to capitalize on rare items in their collections. Creative, novel, or bizarre inclusions are especially prized. Often, the samples featured on these records do not have the blessing of the original copyright holders. Because of this, the use of pseudonyms and anonymous releases are common. Often, even the original sources of the samples are renamed or obscured, leading to some newcomers becoming disconnected from the history of the work.

== See also ==
- Electronic Battle Weapon
- Turntablism
- Remix culture
