= Traktor =

DJ software

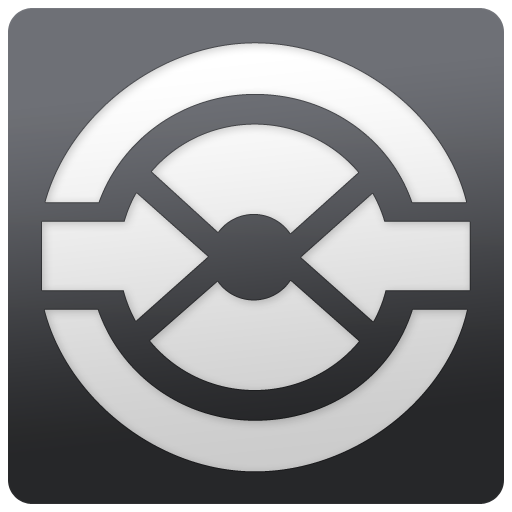
- Developer: Native Instruments
- Initial release: 2000; 26 years ago
- Stable release: 4.4.1 / November 19, 2025; 3 months ago
- Engine: OpenGL 2.1 or higher
- Operating system: macOS Big Sur, macOS Monterey, Windows 10, Windows 11
- Size: 1 GB HD Space
- Type: Digital DJ Software, Vinyl emulation software
- License: Proprietary
- Website: www.native-instruments.com/en/products/dj/traktor

Traktor is DJ software developed by Native Instruments. It is also used as a sub-brand for Native Instruments' associated DJ hardware products.

== History ==
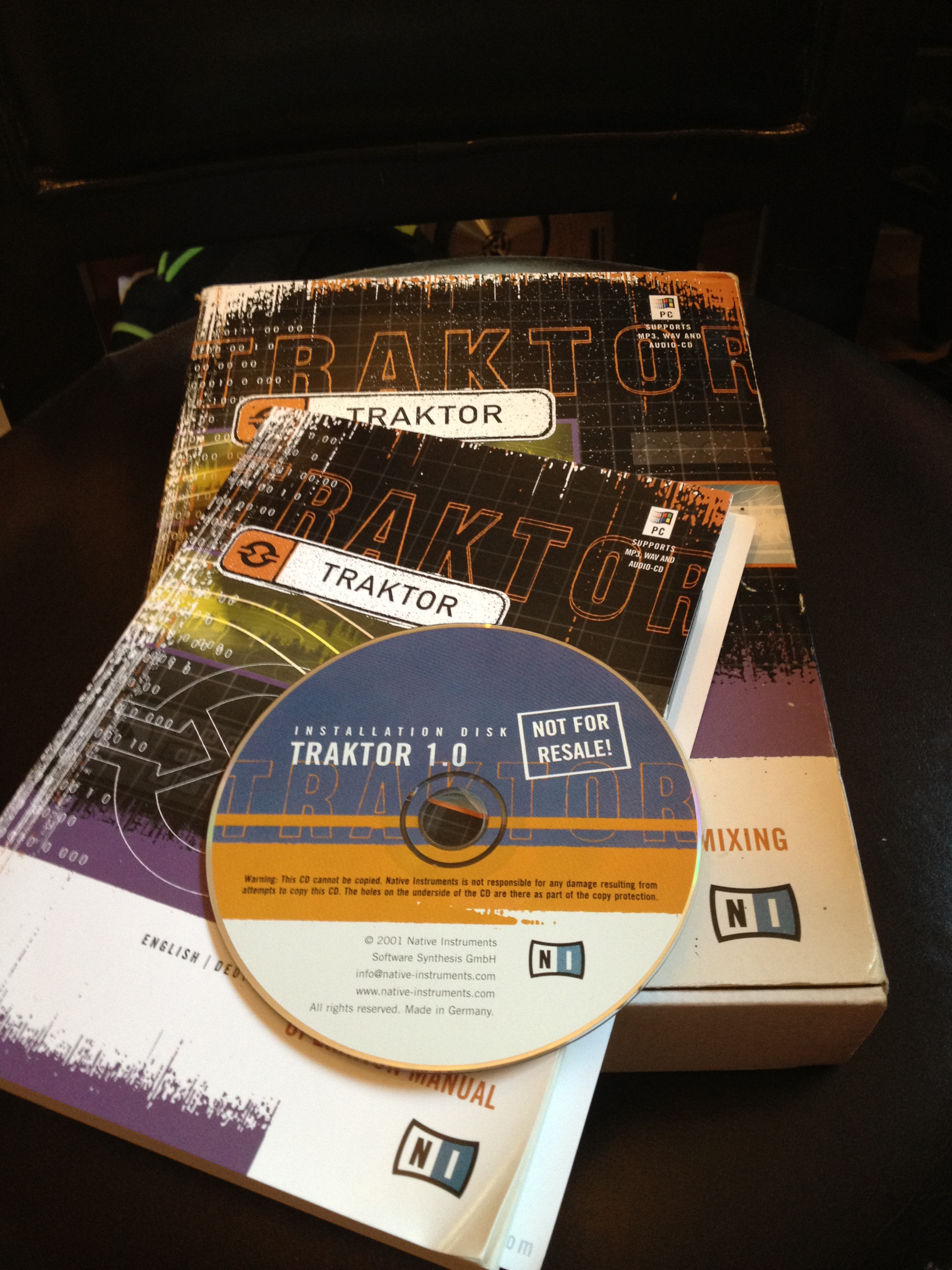
The first version of Traktor DJ Studio, released in 2001.

Traktor was first released in 2000. The initial versions available were Traktor DJ and Traktor Studio, with Studio being the version with the most functionality.

Version 2 of the software (known as Traktor DJ Studio 2) was released in 2002. The new features included scratch macros and expanded looping, MIDI, and cue point functionality. Version 2.5, released in 2003, expanded the time stretching functionality, added Open Sound Control (OSC) support, and introduced GUI customization options.

In 2003 Native Instruments expanded Traktor from purely software. They partnered with Stanton Magnetics to develop Traktor Final Scratch: the software for Stanton's Final Scratch digital vinyl system (which used timecode-stamped vinyl records to control MP3s), whilst Stanton developed the hardware. This partnership also allowed Native Instruments to use the Final Scratch timecode functionality in their own Traktor products.

In 2005, Native Instruments added vinyl emulation features to version 2.6 of Traktor DJ Studio, alongside live input, internet broadcasting, support for more file formats, and expanded MIDI capabilities.

Version 3 of Traktor DJ Studio, announced in November 2005, added two more playback decks (for a total of four), built-in EQ & effects, Beatport online store integration, a four-channel mixer. It was re-branded to Traktor 3 on October 11, 2006, when the partnership between Native Instruments and Stanton Magnetics ended. At this point, Native Instruments began manufacturing their own DJ hardware components.

On October 16, 2008, Native Instruments announced Traktor Pro, to replace Traktor 3. It included an updated GUI, revamped effects interface, and updated cueing and looping features.

The subsequent software, Traktor Pro 2 was announced on February 10, 2011, and released on April 1, 2011. New features included multi-channel support and support for a larger number of concurrent loops.

Native Instruments announced in early 2018 that an entirely new version of Traktor (both hardware & software) had been under development. The new version, entitled Traktor Pro 3, was released on October 18, 2018.

In May 2021, a Beta release of Traktor Pro 3.5 added integration with Beatport Link. This new feature allowed DJs to make track selections from Beatport on the fly for the first time.

Traktor Pro 4 was released in July 2024, adding flexible beatgrids, stem generation, the Pattern Player sequencer and Ozone Maximizer limiter.

== Functionality ==
Core functionality supported by Traktor includes the following:

- 4 virtual decks for audio playback
- Automatic beat detection and grid-alignment of tracks
- Automatic tempo synchronization of tracks, including phase alignment options
- Sampling and looping
- Effects (such as filter, flanger, and delay)
- Waveform displays for visual mixing
- Key detection for tracks
- A 4-channel mixer (one for each virtual deck) for controlling relative levels and frequencies (via multiple equalizer & filter models)
- Automatic gain control
- Real-time track management with incremental search
- Artwork browsing
- iOS and iTunes synchronization options
- Integrated recorder, supporting internal and external audio input
- Support for multiple MIDI controllers and mappings
- MIDI clock functionality to synchronize external hardware
- Support for Ableton Link, to synchronize across multiple devices

== Discontinued variations of Traktor ==
Native Instruments previously offered a lower-priced version of the Traktor software, known as Traktor Duo. Duo featured only 2 virtual decks (compared to the 4 available in the regular version), a single 3-band EQ for each channel, and six effects.

The company have also released Traktor Scratch Pro and Traktor Scratch Duo, which contain the same respective features as their standalone counterparts, along with additional Digital Vinyl System (DVS) functionality, allowing control for timecoded CDs & vinyl.

The entry-level version of the software was known as Traktor LE. It is sometimes bundled with third-party DJ controllers.

A version of Traktor was also available for iOS smartphone & tablet devices. It is known as Traktor DJ.

On August 17, 2010, Native Instruments also released Traktor Pro S4, a new version of the software specialized for their new Traktor Kontrol S4 hardware.

== Traktor controllers ==
Traktor software can be controlled via hardware MIDI controllers. Native Instruments offers several controllers and mixers designed specifically for control of Traktor software:

- Traktor Kontrol S2 - The entry-level all-in-one Traktor Controller. A two-deck, 2-channel controller that has had MK1, MK2, and MK3 variations.
- Traktor Kontrol S4 - A four-deck controller that has gone through 3 variations. MK1 included cue points, plastic jog wheels, and soundcard included. MK2 upgraded to an aluminum jog wheel, and added RGB cue point buttons and a Flux Mode toggle button. MK3 added small displays for more information, and motorized jog wheels with haptic feedback features.
- Traktor Kontrol F1 - A single deck controller with 4 faders, 4 knobs and 16 RGB pads to access all loops and samples available on one page of Traktor's remix deck.
- Traktor Kontrol X1 - A simple cue point-based controller with MK1, MK2, and MK3 variations.
- Traktor Kontrol Z1 - A two-channel mixer compatible with both Traktor Pro with Mk1 and MK2 variations. The Z1 MK1 also supported the now discontinued Traktor DJ iOS app.

=== Discontinued ===
- Traktor Kontrol Z2 - A 2-channel DJ mixer for Traktor Scratch software, with hot cue and remix buttons for turntablists and scratching enthusiasts.
- Traktor Kontrol D2 - A single-deck controller similar to one section of the Traktor Kontrol S8. Includes 8 RGB pads, touch strip, LCD, and controls for stem audio files.
- Traktor Kontrol S5 - With touch strips and LCDs similar to the Traktor Kontrol S8, but with less functionality.
- Traktor Kontrol S8 - The flagship touch strip Traktor controller, with LCDs, four-deck control, extra controls for stem audio files and on board soundcard.

== See also ==
- List of music software § DJ software
- Native Instruments
