= Scratch Live =

Vinyl emulation software

- Developer: Serato Audio Research
- Stable release: 2.5.0 / July 13, 2013
- Operating system: Microsoft Windows, Mac OS X
- Type: Vinyl emulation software
- Website: serato.com/scratchlive/

Scratch Live is a vinyl emulation software application created by New Zealand–based Serato Audio Research, distributed by and licensed exclusively to Rane Corporation. Serato was first known for its Pro Tools plug-in, Pitch N Time, which was sold predominantly to the film industry.

Scratch Live allows manipulation and playback of digital audio files using traditional vinyl turntables or CD players via special timecode vinyl records or CDs.

The product is discontinued and has been replaced by Serato DJ.
