= InMusic Brands =

American holding company

inMusic Brands, Inc.
- Type: Private
- Founded: 2012; 14 years ago
- Founder: Jack O'Donnell
- Headquarters: Cumberland, Rhode Island, United States
- Number of locations: 12
- Products: Music production equipment
- Owner: Jack O'Donnell
- Website: www.inmusicbrands.com

inMusic Brands, Inc. is an American enterprise that is the parent company for a family of brands of varying audio products used in the DJ, music production, live sound, musical instrument, pro audio, software, stage lighting, and consumer electronics industries. The company's corporate headquarters are located in Cumberland, Rhode Island, with additional offices in Canada, Germany, United Kingdom, Taiwan, Japan, and Bulgaria.

== History ==
=== Numark ===
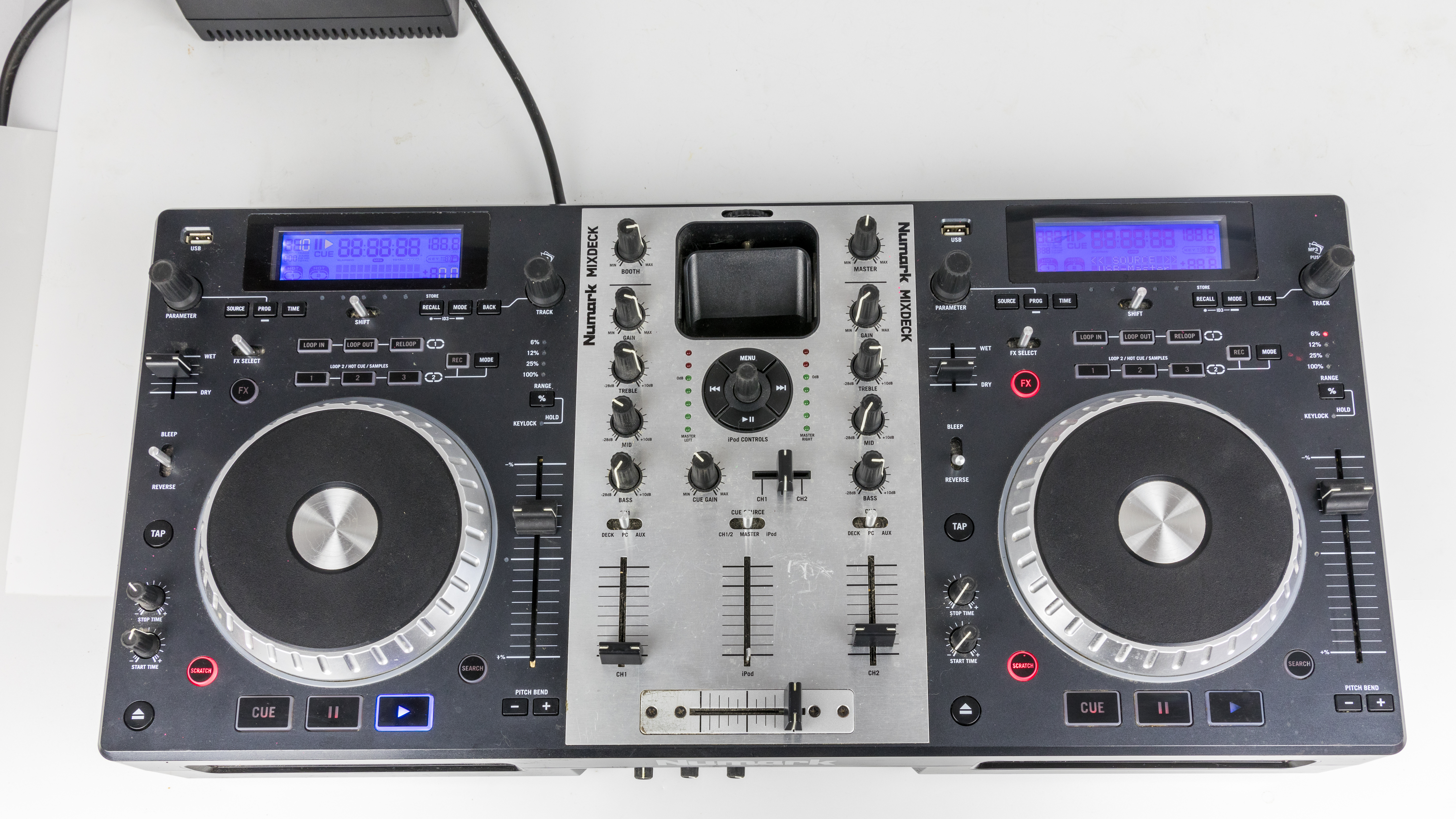
Numark Mixdeck

In 1992, future inMusic founder and CEO Jack O’Donnell was working as vice president of sales at Stanton Magnetics when he learned the assets of Numark Electronics were available for purchase. Founded in Edison, New Jersey by Harry and Robert Kotovsky in 1971, Numark was among the earliest DJ equipment manufacturers, and responsible for innovations like the first DJ mixer with a built-in sampler (the DM1775) and the first dual-well CD player (the CD-5020). O’Donnell proposed to Stanton management that they should acquire Numark's assets, but they chose not to, and O’Donnell decided to resign from his position at Stanton and purchase Numark himself.

=== Alesis and more acquisitions ===
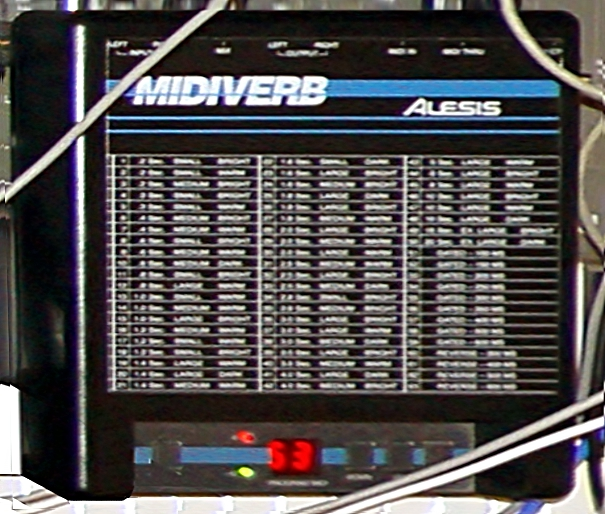
Alesis MIDIVerb

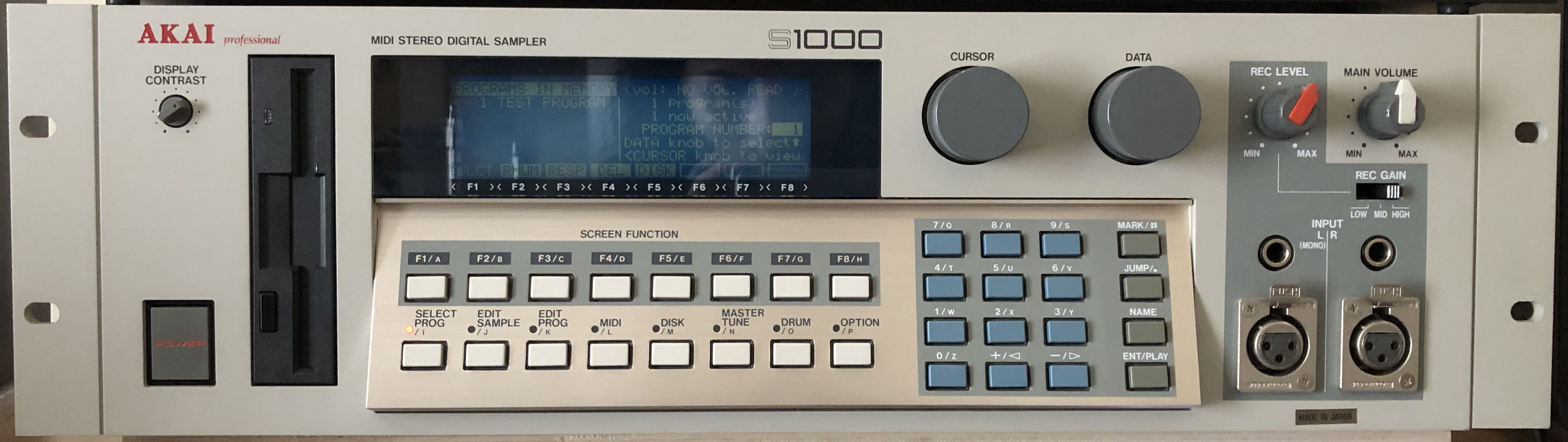
AKAI S1000

Under O’Donnell's management, Numark recovered and grew, and he found himself looking for new opportunities. In 2001 O’Donnell acquired Alesis, a company that had established itself in the recording market with affordable effects and later the revolutionary ADAT digital tape recorder, as well as drum machines and synthesizers. The following year he introduced the ION Audio brand, focused on entry-level and consumer electronics products.

In 2005, O’Donnell purchased the Akai Professional Musical Instrument division (previously spun off from Akai Electronics). Musical instrument designer Roger Linn has accused that immediately following the acquisition, Akai ceased all royalty payments owed to him, and that O'Donnell sent legal threats warning him away from attempting to collect further royalties. His company additionally acquired DJ software brand Mixmeister in 2007 and Alto Professional in 2010. Despite continuing to sell the product through Numark, development of MixMeister was subsequently abandoned with the last update being v7.7.1 in 2015.

=== M-Audio ===
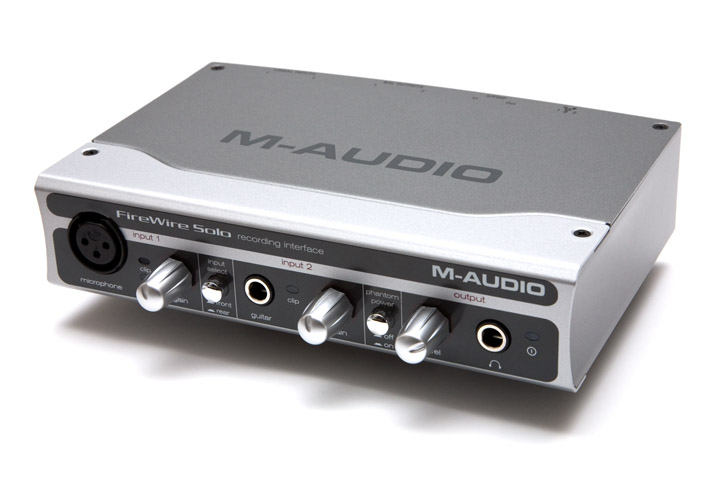
M-Audio FireWire Solo

In February 2012 O’Donnell acquired software synthesizer company Sonivox, and in July of the same year, he acquired M-Audio and the AIR Software Group from Avid Technology, Inc. for $17 million.

=== Further growth ===
In April 2014, inMusic acquired Denon DJ, Denon Professional and Marantz Professional from D&M Holdings, who retained the non-professional consumer divisions of those brands.

In August 2015, the company launched a new brand of lighting products, MARQ.

In July 2016, inMusic acquired Rane Corporation.

In 2017, leveraging the legacy of the Akai pedal of the same name, inMusic launched a new line of guitar effects processing products branded HeadRush.

In May 2018, the inMusic company Denon DJ acquired SoundSwitch.

In April 2020, inMusic acquired ROLI's subsidiary FXpansion's drum software instrument BFD. In May of the same year, inMusic acquired Stanton from Gibson Brands.

In June 2023, inMusic acquired Moog.

In May of 2026 it was announced that inMusic was acquiring Native Instruments.

== Brands ==
- 2getheraudio
- AIR Music Technology
- Akai Professional
- Alesis
- Alto Professional
- Arkaos
- BFD
- Denon Professional
- Denon DJ
- Engine DJ
- HeadRush
- ION Audio
- M-Audio
- Marantz Professional
- MARQ Lighting
- MixMeister
- Moog Music
- Native Instruments
- Numark
- Rane
- Sonivox
- SoundSwitch
- Stanton
