= Mixcrate =

Defunct online audio distribution platform

- Company type: Private
- Website type: Social networking service, music website
- Founded: 2009 (Bay Area, California, United States)
- Headquarters: Alameda, California, {{{location_country}}}
- Area served: Worldwide
- Founder: Chris Yee
- Website: Mixcrate.com
- Registration: Required
- Launched: November 2009
- Current status: Inactive

Mixcrate was an online audio distribution platform based in California, United States that enabled its users to upload, promote and share their DJ mixes to a worldwide audience and to help DJs promote and grow their careers as professional DJs. It was a community-based platform designed for DJs mainly aimed at promoting their mixes and for fans to follow the work of their favorite DJs. It also catered to music listeners, club promoters, radio stations and event organizers looking to discover new talent.

The service has been described as "the premier platform to enable DJs to share their talent with a worldwide audience while connecting with their peers and fans" and "one of the best known DJ mix hosting sites in the world" by Digital DJ Tips.

On October 20, 2016, Mixcrate shut down. A message posted to the site and to its Facebook Page read: "Unfortunately, Mixcrate received a letter from a respected entity in the record industry. While Mixcrate does not believe the site violates any laws, we do not have the means to operate under current conditions. It's with deep regret that we must shut down the website."

== History ==
Mixcrate was founded and launched by Chris Yee in November 2009. The idea for Mixcrate came about after Yee mentioned the idea to Genghis Mendoza while at their Silicon Valley tech job. Both Yee and Mendoza are from San Francisco and grew up within the mobile DJ scene of the Bay Area. They realized their passion for DJing and web development could create a user-focused destination that would build on the idea of a community. After the development of the site, it was launched to twenty DJ friends and family members to help test. The site gained international viewership from many countries around the world even during the testing period.

Mixcrate was the most trafficked social network for DJ artists in the United States, according to Comscore.

Though now defunct, Mixcrate's official Facebook and Twitter accounts are still active.

== Features ==
Mixcrate allowed users to browse and listen to DJ mixes on the site. Registered users could "like", download (if enabled and logged in), save a mix to their playlist, and comment on a mix. Users could also "follow" other users, both DJs and listeners, to be notified of their recent activities on the site such as newly uploaded mixes (by DJs), recent likes and comments etc., which is displayed on the activity feed on the homepage. Registered DJs could upload an unlimited number of mixes, with a file size limit of 190MB for each mix.

Users also had the option of directly sharing mixes via Facebook, Twitter and Google+.

== Impact and recognition ==
In a Vice magazine interview with culture writer, record collector, music journalist, author, podcast host, DJ and Professor of Sociology Oliver Wang about the history of the San Francisco Bay Area's Filipino American mobile DJ scene, when asked if there was "Anything cool you can point our readers to online?", he responded: "Mixcrate.com, for example, is one platform where quite a few mobile DJs from this scene have posted up old mixes." Notable Filipino American DJs such as Qbert, Mix Master Mike, Shortkut and Apollo had posted their mixes to the site.

Mixcrate has been included in many lists of top/best alternatives to SoundCloud by publications and websites such as in the following:

- "SoundCloud Alternatives: The Best Websites for Mixtapes and New Music If SoundCloud Shuts Down" – The Independent
- "4 Alternatives to SoundCloud for Hosting DJ Mixes" – Digital DJ Tips
- "Best SoundCloud Alternatives - Top 5 Apps Like SoundCloud to Try" – PhoneWorld
- "Six Alternatives to SoundCloud for Hosting DJ Mixes" – Fact Magazine
- "Every Good Alternative to SoundCloud for DJs" – DJTechTools
- "Best SoundCloud Alternatives" – Techboomers
- "Top SoundCloud Alternatives" – APowerSoft
- "5 SoundCloud Alternatives" – TechShout
- "Four Soundcloud Alternatives to Discover and Share Great Music" – Lifehacker
- "SoundCloud Is Now, But What's Next? Five Great Alternatives" – Trax Magazine
- "6 Alternatives to SoundCloud" – TuExperto
- "Top SoundCloud Alternatives to Get Your Music Heard" – GuidingTech
- "Six SoundCloud Alternatives" – 5Mag
- "SoundCloud Alternatives for DJ Mixes" – OnTheRiseAcademy
- "Best SoundCloud Alternatives" – CompsMag
- "Best SoundCloud Alternatives - Top 5 Music Apps like SoundCloud" – iTubeGo
- "Best SoundCloud Alternatives" – BestReviews

Bobby Owsinski, writing for Forbes magazine, included Mixcrate in his article "Why SoundCloud's Demise Would Hurt Indie Artists" as a "competitive service similar to SoundCloud." Mixcrate was also included in "best sites" lists such as in "The Best Places to Host Your DJ Mixes Online" by Trackhunter and "Best Sites to Share Your DJ Mix Online" by Digital DJ Hub.

TopSitesLike.com produced a list of 13 sites similar to Mixcrate.

== Similar services ==
- Mixcloud
- SoundCloud
- Play.fm
- Pandora
