= Rapid Evolution =

Software tool for DJs

- Developer(s): Jesse Bickmore
- Operating system: Any OS that supports Java
- Type: Music Software
- Website: Mixshare

Rapid Evolution (also known as RE) is a software tool for DJs, providing filtering and searching features suitable for musicians. It can analyze audio files and automatically determine properties such as the musical key, beats per minute (BPM), beat intensity and ReplayGain.

It supports file types MP3, MP4, WAV, FLAC, OGG, AAC and APE. It helps DJs to organize and profile their music, and assists in the process of mixing music by utilizing song metadata to be able to show harmonically compatible songs and songs of a similar style. It allows DJs to save and remember which songs are good matches (like a personal, digital mixing journal) and to plan entire mix sets.

One of its uses is to assist in a DJ technique called harmonic mixing. Once the musical key and BPM is known for a set of songs, DJs can use music theory (such as the Circle of Fifths) to identify songs that are harmonically compatible. The act of mixing harmonically can help eliminate dissonant tones while mixing songs together. Since identifying whether songs can be made harmonically compatible can be quite complex (once features such as pitch lock are introduced), the software assists DJs by being able to show them which songs in their collection can be made harmonically compatible with any particular song. It can also assist DJs in the act of beatmatching by showing which songs are in a compatible BPM range, and the percent of BPM difference.

Rapid Evolution is created and released through Mixshare.com. The metadata generated by Rapid Evolution is shared through the central servers at Mixshare.com, which can be browsed online. There are 1 million songs added to the database sharing information such as key, BPM, styles and ratings.

== History ==
Rapid Evolution was developed for the Windows environment and released in 2003. Starting in version 2.0 it was switched to run on the Java platform, allowing it to run in virtually any environment. It is still actively developed.

Several improvements to the key detection algorithm have been introduced over the years. Rapid Evolution is the only program which can detect advanced key modes, such as aeolian, ionian, dorian, phrygian, lydian and mixolydian. To date, there has only been one serious comparison of key detection accuracy (including programs such as Mixed In Key and Mixmeister). It was shown that Rapid Evolution is the most accurate.

The program's source code was made available in November 2013.

== Community interest ==
Rapid Evolution was originally a freeware program. Due to its vast feature set, Rapid Evolution tends to be suited more for experienced DJs versus beginners.

== See also ==
- Harmonic mixing
- Music Theory
- DJing
