= DJ mixer =

Type of audio mixing console

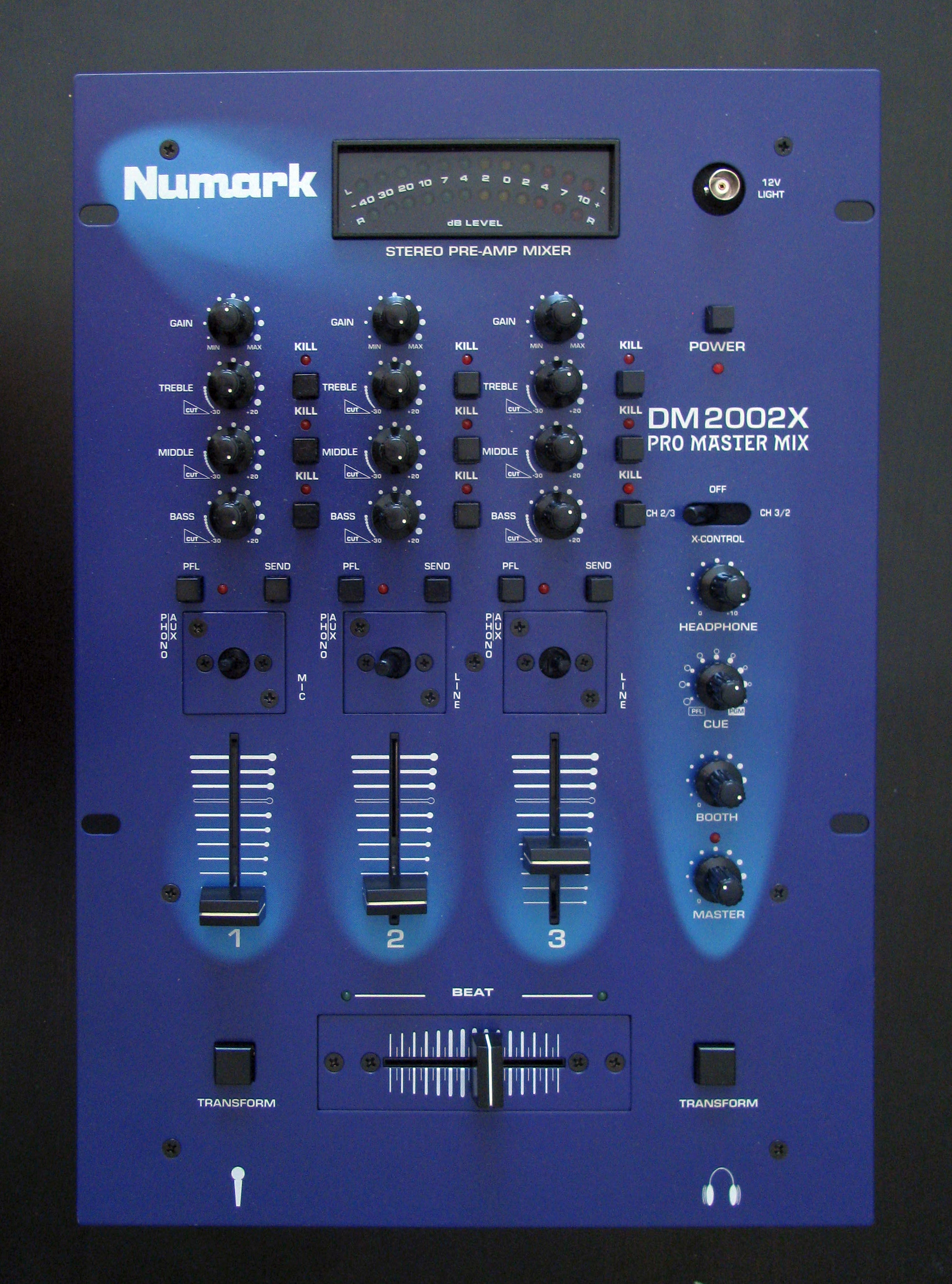
A Numark DM2002X Pro Master DJ mixer. This three channel mixer can have up to three input sound sources. The gain control knobs and equalization control knobs allow the volume and tone of each sound source to be adjusted. The vertical faders allow for further adjustment of the volume of each sound source. The horizontally-mounted crossfader enables the DJ to smoothly transition from a song on one sound source to a song from a different sound source.

DJ Qbert in Rainbow Warehouse in Birmingham (Video with close-up photography at the DJ mixer, though without sound). From 1:36, heavy use of the crossfader can be seen.

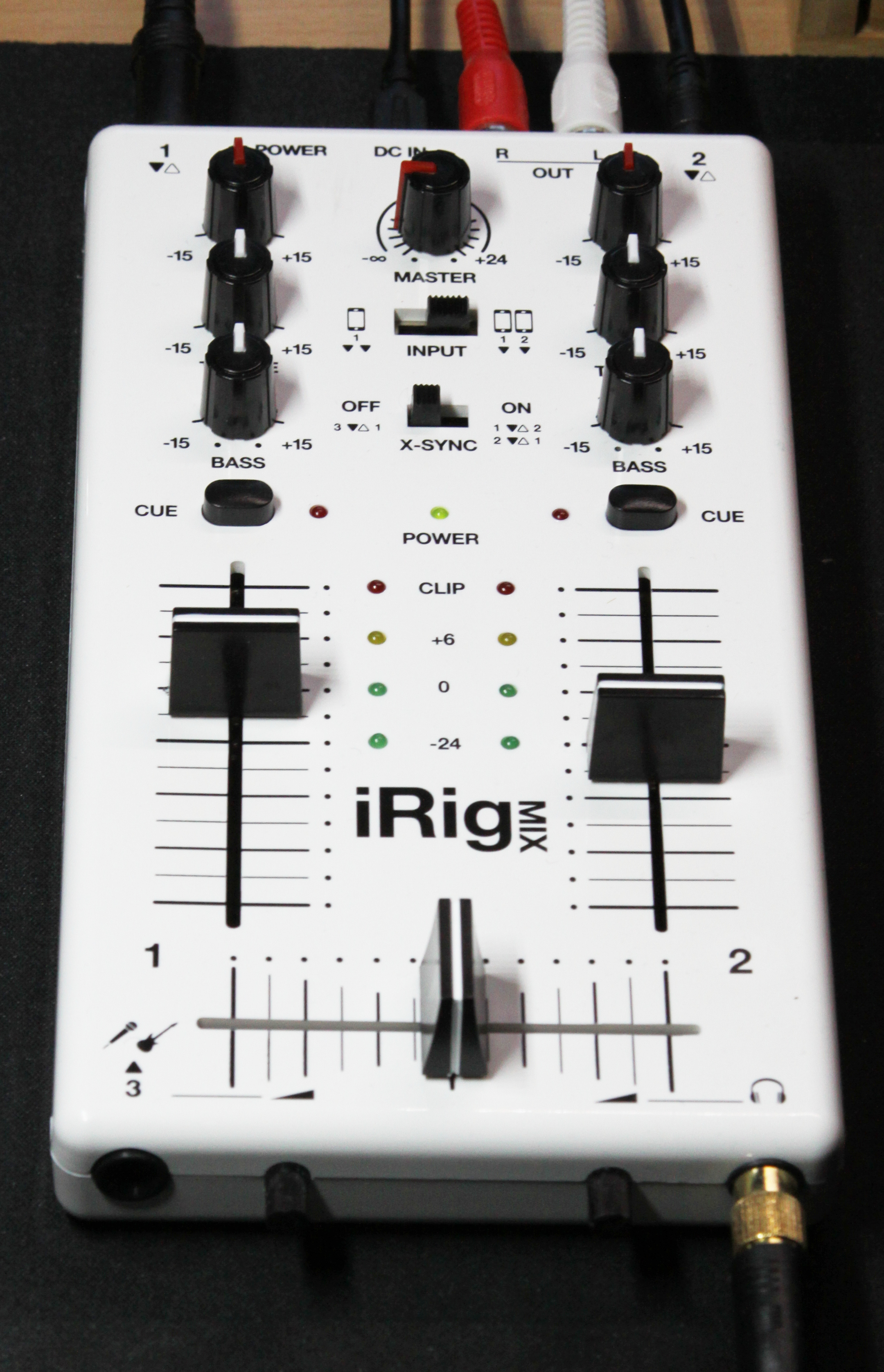
An iRig Mix DJ mixer

A DJ mixer is a type of audio mixing console used by disc jockeys (DJs) to control and manipulate multiple audio signals. Some DJs use the mixer to make seamless transitions from one song to another when they are playing records at a dance club. Hip hop DJs and turntablists use the DJ mixer to play record players like a musical instrument and create new sounds. DJs in the disco, house music, electronic dance music and other dance-oriented genres use the mixer to make smooth transitions between different sound recordings as they are playing. The sources are typically record turntables, compact cassettes, CDJs, or DJ software on a laptop. DJ mixers allow the DJ to use headphones to preview the next song before playing it to the audience. Most low- to mid-priced DJ mixers can only accommodate two turntables or CD players, but some mixers (such as the ones used in larger nightclubs) can accommodate up to six turntables or CD players. DJs and turntablists in hip hop music and nu metal use DJ mixers to create beats, loops and so-called scratching sound effects.

== Description ==
DJ mixers are usually much smaller than other mixing consoles used in sound reinforcement systems and sound recording. Whereas a typical nightclub mixer will have 24 inputs and a professional recording studio's huge mixer may have 48, 72 or even 96 inputs, a typical DJ mixer may have only two to four inputs. The key feature that differentiates a DJ mixer from other types of larger audio mixers is the ability to redirect (cue) the sounds of a non-playing source to headphones, so the DJ can find the desired part of a song or track. DJ mixers along with this have multiple tracks that can be selected. The modern DJ mixing board can have 2-6 tracks which are able to be played simultaneously.

A crossfader has the same engineering design as fader, in that it is a sliding control, but unlike faders, which are usually vertical, crossfaders are usually horizontal. To understand the function of a crossfader, one can think of the crossfader in three key positions. For a DJ mixer that has two sound sources connected, such as two record turntables, when the crossfader is in the far left position, the mixer will output only turntable A's music. When the crossfader is in the far right position, the mixer will output only turntable B's music. When the crossfader is at its midpoint (which is always marked with a horizontal line), the mixer will output a blend of turntable A's music and turntable B's music. The other points along the crossfader's path produce different mixes of A and B.

DJ mixers typically have phono preamplifiers to hook up turntables. The signal that comes directly out of a vinyl turntable is too weak to be amplified through a PA system. Before a turntable can be usable in a mix, it needs to be preamplified. DJ mixers are also used to create DJ mixes, which are recorded and sold. DJ mixers usually have equalization controls for bass and treble of each channel. Some 2010-era DJ mixers have onboard electronic or digital effects units such as echo or reverb. Some DJ mixers also feature a built-in USB sound card to connect to a computer running DJ software without requiring a separate sound card. DJ mixers typically have a microphone input, so that a microphone can be plugged into the mixer, enabling the DJ to announce songs or act as a master of ceremonies (MC) for an event. Some DJ mixers have a kill switch, which completely cuts out a channel, or, on some models, completely cut out a frequency band (e.g., all the bass).

== Outputs ==
The output from a DJ mixer is typically plugged into a sound reinforcement system or a PA system at a dance, rave, nightclub or similar venue or event. The sound reinforcement system consists of power amplifiers which amplify the signal to the level that can drive speaker enclosures, which since the 1980s typically include both full-range speakers and subwoofers for the deep bass sounds. If the DJ is performing a mix for a radio station or television station, the output from the DJ mixer is plugged into the main audio console being used for the broadcast. If the DJ is performing a mix that is being recorded by a recording studio, the output from the DJ mixer is plugged into the main audio console used for the recording, which is in turn plugged into the recording medium (audiotape, hard disk, etc.). In some cases, such as when a DJ is performing a set at a club for dancers that is also being simultaneously broadcast over the radio or television system or recorded for a music video or other show, the output from the DJ mixer is plugged into the sound reinforcement system and into the main audio console being used for the broadcast and/or recording. At club sets, some DJs may use a monitor speaker to hear the house's main mix. This monitor speaker can have its volume increased or decreased by the DJ as needed.

== Power ==
DJ mixers have an AC mains plug that is connected to the wall to supply electric power for the unit. Some DJ mixers can take batteries, which enables users to mix songs outside or away from electric power sources, with the output being plugged into a portable boom box or other battery-powered sound system. Within the past decade or so, DJ Mixers can be powered via Computer through USB or USBC depending on the board.

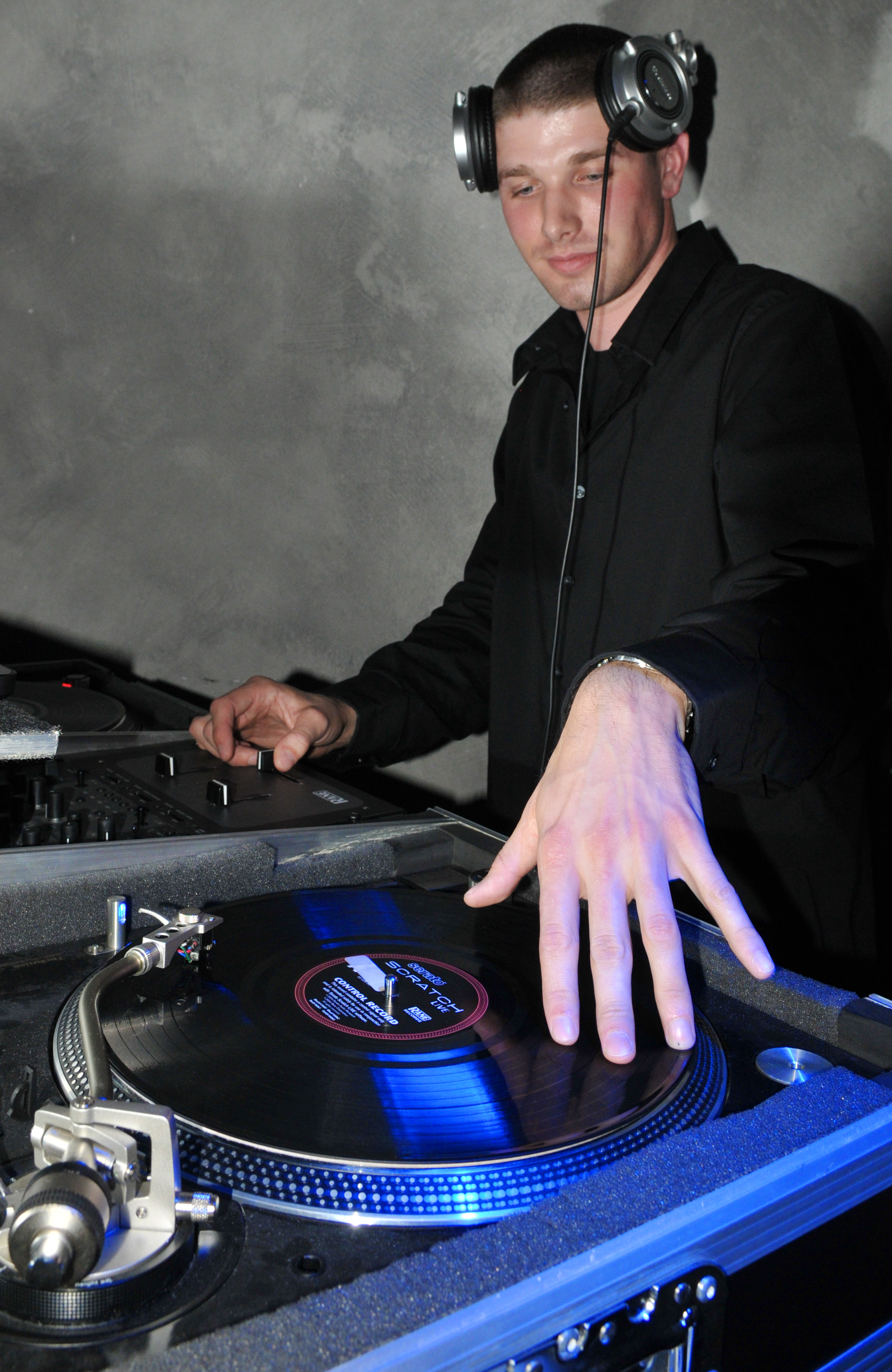
A disc jockey performing at the 2009 Air Force Ball. With one hand he is manipulating a vinyl record on a turnable; the other hand is controlling the mix with a DJ mixer.

== History ==
DJ mixing played a key role in the development of the African-American style of hip hop music. Early in the years of the DJ Mixers arrival, Jamaicans played a large role in DJ and music culture. Many smaller Jamaican DJs utilized DJ mixers to mix music that reflected their daily struggle in society. DJ mixing provided an outlet for groups of people to express their hardship. In hip hop music and occasionally in other genres that are influenced by hip hop (e.g., nu metal), the turntable is used as a musical instrument by DJs, who use turntables along with a DJ mixer to create unique rhythmic sounds and other sound effects. Manipulation of a record as part of the music, rather than for normal playback or mixing, is called turntablism. The basis of turntablism, and its best known technique, is scratching, pioneered by Grand Wizzard Theodore. It was not until Herbie Hancock's "Rockit" in 1983 that the turntablism movement was recognized in popular music outside of a hip hop context. In the 2010s, many hip hop DJs use DJ CD players or digital record emulator devices to create scratching sounds; nevertheless, some DJs still scratch with vinyl records.

In the United States, Black artists who rose to fame/influence were regarded as entrepreneurs in their respected communities and inspired their counterparts who faced the everyday struggle of racism. The DJ mixer provided a medium for African American culture, many records of which relayed their experiences in America. Countless times, young black men in the urban scene were refused of the opportunity to establish their DJ careers through gigs and live-performances. The DJ Mixer gave rise to new genres created by African Americans which spread across the U.S over time.

DJ mixing also played a key role in disco music in the 1970s. In disco clubs, DJs would use mixers to transition seamlessly from one song to another and create a mix of songs that would keep the dancers energized. DJ equipment not only assisted in the ability to transition songs, but also played a large role in gender dynamics within the club scene. The utilization of DJ mixing technology allowed DJs to cater to larger audiences and not leave out a particular group. Many nightclubs within Europe disputed what genres were considered "masculine" or "women-friendly", yet DJ mixing provided a middle-ground by mixing different genres.

One of the pioneers of DJ mixing equipment design was Rudy Bozak. Rudy Bozak created the first commercially available DJ mixing board, the Bozak CMA-10-DL2. The Bozak CMA-10-DL2 was the first mass produced mixer which became the club standard for DJs in the 1970s. Established DJs were the first to use this technology. Though the Bozak CMA-10-DL2 was reliable, the mixer lacked mobility. Those who could not access and use the Bozak CMA-10-DL2, more specifically, mobile DJs in the Brooklyn/Bronx, relied on developing new solutions to still mix. A prominent champion of developing new mixing techniques, was Ricky Grant. Using microphone mixers plugged into turntables, Ricky could find creative ways to chop beat patterns without the need of modern mixing technologies. Many young aspiring Black DJs along with Ricky pioneered other workarounds, advancing DJ culture and technology.

During this era, Beatmatching and beatmixing with a DJ mixer were first used to encourage dancers not to leave the dancefloor between songs. By beatmatching song A and song B, a DJ can transition seamlessly between two songs, without creating a break in the music. Typically, when a DJ is using beatmatching, they will let song A play until it nears its end. As song A is playing, the DJ "cues up" song B in their headphones and adjusts the speed of record player B until the beats of song A and song B are synchronized ("synced up"). Then, once the two songs' beats are synchronized, they can slowly fade in song B while song A is nearing its ending. In the 2000s, DJ mixers have been used for harmonic mixing.
