= Pitch control =

Control on an audio device

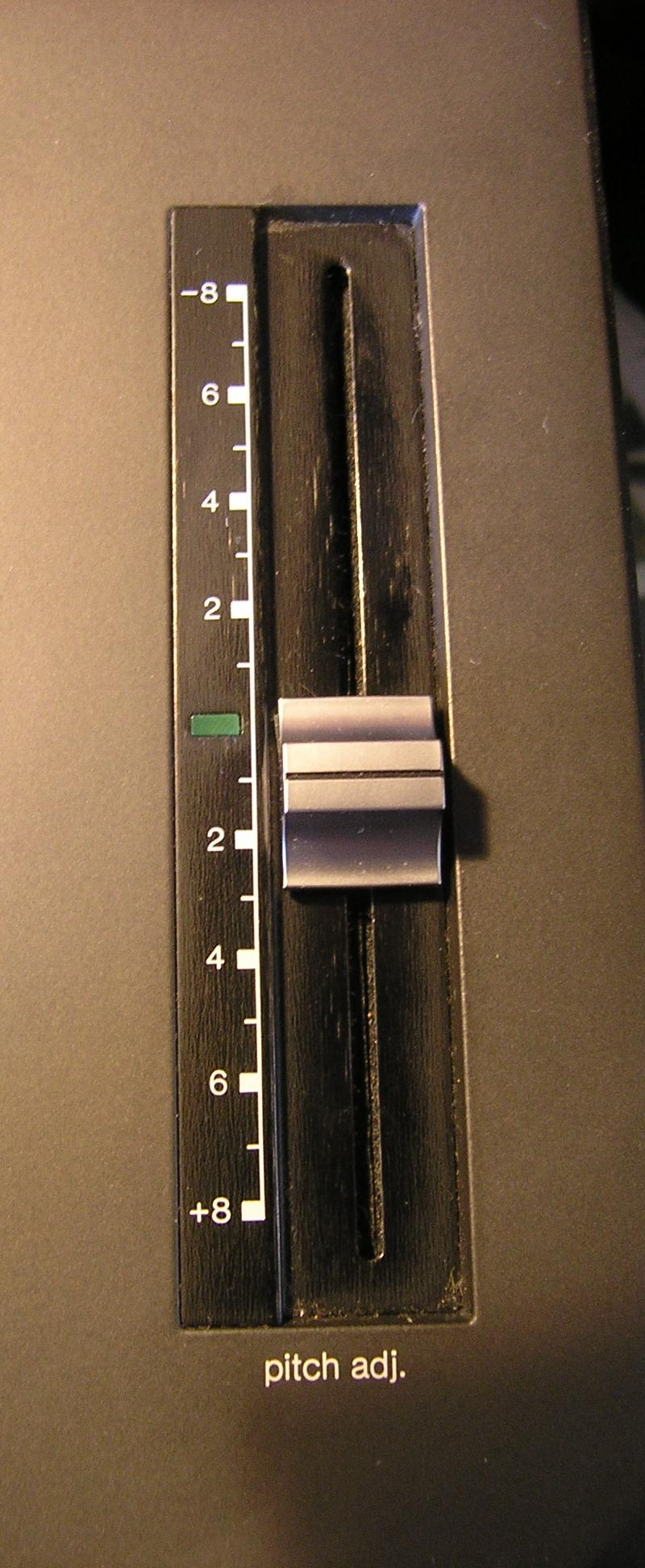
Technics SL-1210MK2 turntable pitch control slider

A variable speed pitch control (or vari-speed) is a control on an audio device such as a turntable, tape recorder, or CD player that allows the operator to deviate from a standard speed (such as 33, 45 or even 78 rpm on a turntable), resulting in adjustments in pitch. The latter term "vari-speed" is more commonly used for tape decks, particularly in the UK. Analog pitch controls vary the voltage being used by the playback device; digital controls use digital signal processing to change the playback speed or pitch. A typical DJ deck allows the pitch to be increased or reduced by up to 8%, which is achieved by increasing or reducing the speed at which the platter rotates.

Turntable or CD playing speed may be changed for beatmatching and other DJ techniques, while pitch shift using a pitch control has myriad uses in sound recording.

== Vari-speed in consumer cassette decks ==
Superscope, Inc. of Sun Valley added vari-speed as a feature of portable cassette decks in 1975. The C-104 and C-105 models incorporated this feature.

Superscope trademarked the name Vari-Speed in 1974. The trademark category was "Computer & Software Products & Electrical & Scientific Products." The trademark goods and services use was "Magnetic tape recorders and reproducers". The trademark expired in 1995.

== DJing ==
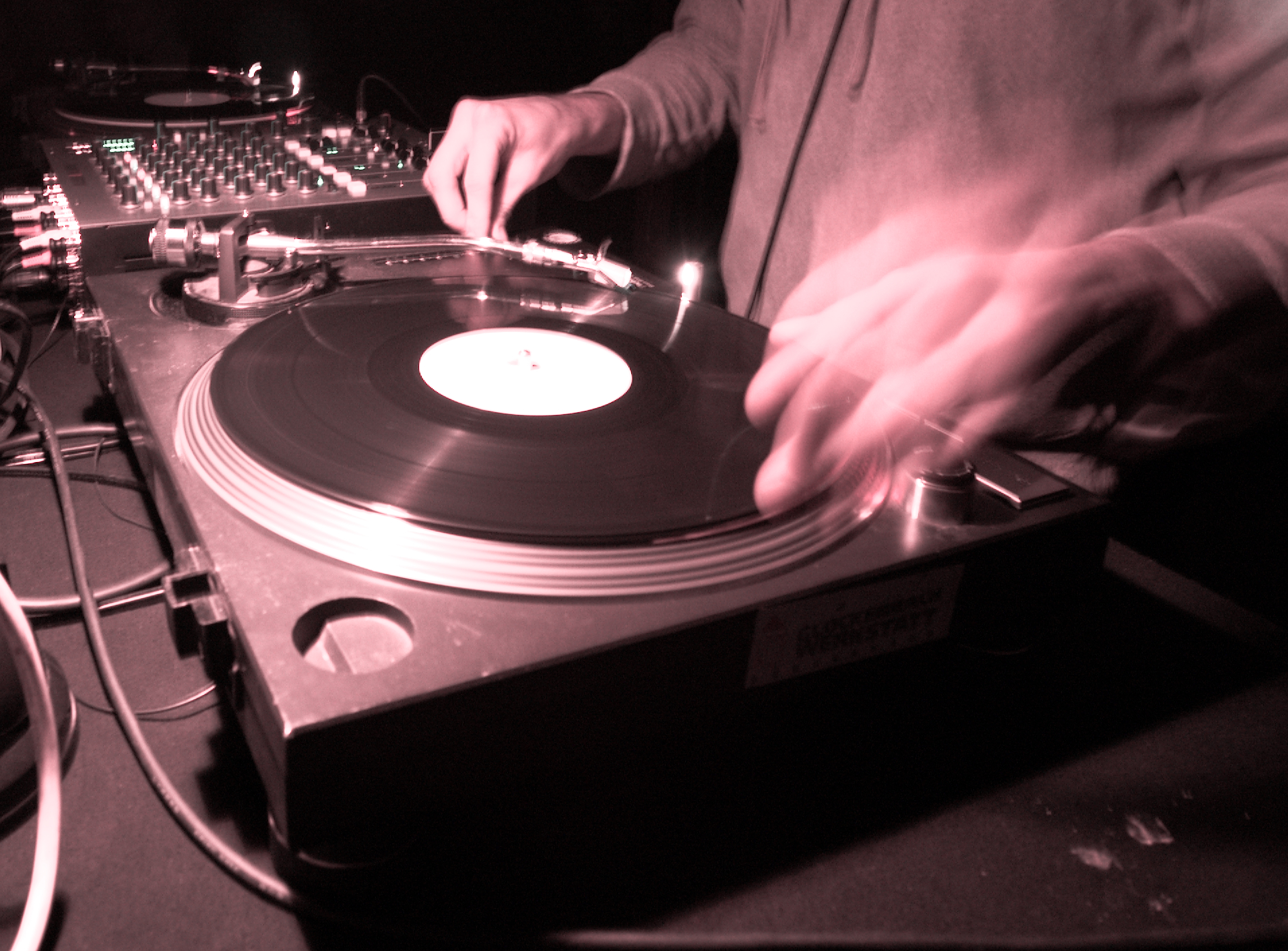
Pitch adjustment and beatmatching on a Technics SL-1210MK2 turntable

Pitch control is fundamental for DJing. By changing pitch, a DJ can alter the speed of an upcoming track to match its tempo to that of the currently playing track so that the beats are synchronized, a technique called beatmatching. Through beatmatching, a DJ can create smooth transitions between tracks in a DJ set.

Turntables, CDJs, DJ controllers, and DJ software allow DJs to change the speed at which a track is played for this purpose. Technics SL-1200 turntables allow pitch changes to +/− 8% or 16%, depending on the model, and modern DJ gear often allows a range of +/- 100% (from pausing the track to playing the track twice as fast).

Modern DJ equipment also features time stretching, which allows the speed of a track to be changed without affecting its pitch, a feature often called "Master Tempo" or "Key Lock". Some equipment also features pitch shifting, allowing pitch to be adjusted independently of tempo; this allows changing the musical key of tracks so that transitions between them sound more pleasing to the listener, a practice called harmonic mixing.

== Reset button ==
On Technics SL-1200 turntables, pressing the Reset button returns the pitch to a fixed preset value of +/−0% regardless of the pitch control position.

== See also ==
- Audio time stretching and pitch scaling
- Beatmatching
