= MIK =

MIK could refer to:

- Methyl isopropyl ketone, a solvent
- FC MiK Kaluga, former Russian football team, now merged into FC Kaluga
- MIK (character set), a Bulgarian character code set used with DOS
- Multiple-Indicator Kriging, a statistical interpolation method
- Montazhno-Ispytatelnyi Kompleks, the Roscosmos assembly-test facility for space vehicles
- Mixed In Key, a Windows and Macintosh software that simplifies harmonic mixing

== Transport ==
- MIK, MTR station code for Ming Kum stop, Hong Kong
- MIK, National Rail station code for Micklefield railway station, England
- MIK, IATA code for Mikkeli Airport, Finland
