= Voice compression =

Voice compression may mean different things:

- Speech encoding refers to compression for transmission or storage, possibly to an unintelligible state, with decompression used prior to playback.
- Time-compressed speech refers to voice compression for immediate playback, without any decompression (so that the final speech sounds faster to the listener).
- Audio level compression refers to a sound recording effect which increases the perceived volume of a sound.
