= Play.fm =

Play.fm was a free music streaming platform and social networking service for DJ and club culture. DJ sets, radio shows, and live recordings are collected and uploaded by registered users and can be listened to on demand. The platform was started 2004 in Vienna (Austria) by owner Georg Hitzenberger.

== Web audio and radio shows archive ==
Registered users can upload recordings from 30 minutes to 9 hours in length which can then be freely streamed by users on demand and without interruption in CD-quality sound. Users can search the database by DJ, artist, label, genre, club, location, and event.

About 110,000 live recordings are available from national and international clubs (e.g. Flex in Vienna, The Loft in Barcelona, Womb in Tokyo, Rothko in New York City, Space in Ibiza) and festivals (e.g. springfestival in Graz, Stereolize in Paris, Exit in Novi Sad), and well known or newcomer DJs (e.g. DJ Romeo, Coldcut, Sven Väth, Laurent Garnier, Dmitry Tsoy, Tiefschwarz, Miss Kittin, Princess Superstar, Kid Koala, Roots Manuva, Ed Rush and Patife, Carl Craig, Ellen Allien, Gilles Peterson, Derrick May, Jazzanova, DJ Hell, Trentemoller, Marshall Jefferson, Bob Sinclar, Juan Atkins, Jamie xx).

Until 2012 the radio shows were recorded and streamed live at the studio in quartier21 (Museumsquartier), Flex Cafe, and Expedit, all based in Vienna (Austria). 150 labels, record stores, event managers, and DJs presented their own radio shows (e.g. Vienna Scientists, Cheap Records, Indigo Inc).

Together with Waves Vienna, an annual music festival and conference, Play.fm organized DJ contests in 2013 and 2014.

In 2015 the web site was redesigned and new features were introduced to improve usability and music related social networking.

== Awards and funding ==
Play.fm received funding from Departure in 2008, an initiative of the City of Vienna and enterprise of the Vienna Business Agency.

Together with the Museumsquartier (quartier21), Play.fm was awarding two grants within the framework of an artist-in-residence programme for two young international artists for a one-month stay in Vienna. In May 2008 Maik Loewen from Cologne visited the PLAY.FM team.

More awards:

- MidemNet Lab Finalist (Cannes, 2011)
- App Star Award Deutschland / Cebit (Hannover, 2011)
- Multimedia & e-Business Award / Category Social Media (Vienna, 2009)
- Vienna Leader Web 2.0 (Vienna, 2009)
- Mercur Innovation Award / Category Creativity (Vienna, 2009)

From 2010 to 2012 Play.fm was also part of the research project "Innovation Network for Smart Applications and Media INSAME / SmartReality", funded by FFG/Innovative Oberflächengestaltung von Compositebauteilen (COIN), and alongside TU Graz, Seekda, and Semantic Technology Institute International. The goal was to develop a mobile application, enriched with augmented reality and integrating audio content by PLAY.FM.

== Apps ==
Play.fm offers apps for Android, iOS, and Windows Phone.
