= Mixcloud =

British music streaming service

- Company type: Private
- Website type: Music streaming; Internet community (Social community)
- Founded: 2008; 18 years ago
- Headquarters: London, England
- Area served: Worldwide
- Founders: Nikhil Shah; Nico Perez; Mat Clayton; Sam Cooke
- Website: www.mixcloud.com
- Registration: Optional; required to upload
- Launched: 2008; 18 years ago
- Current status: Active

Mixcloud is a British online music streaming service that allows for the listening and distribution of radio shows, DJ mixes and podcasts, which are crowdsourced by its registered users.

In April 2018, Mixcloud announced that it raised $11.5 million from WndrCo LLC, a holding company based in Los Angeles and San Francisco that invests in media and technology businesses for the long term. The financing will fund Mixcloud's expansion globally.

== History ==
Mixcloud was founded as a startup company through the lean startup process in 2008 by Nikhil Shah and Nico Perez, who met at the University of Cambridge. Developers Mat Clayton and Sam Cooke were added to the team in its early stages. As of 2012, Mixcloud was reported to have over 3 million active users and over 500,000 registered Facebook application users. In October 2017, Mixcloud signed direct licensing agreement with Warner Music.

== Features ==
Mixcloud allows all users to browse and stream audio content uploaded on its site. Registered users can upload content such as radio shows, DJ mixes and podcasts, as well as promote and distribute their content through Mixcloud's own social networking widget. As of November 2011, Mixcloud lifted its 100-megabyte limit on uploaded content and allows uploads of 500 megabytes. Registered members may join a group, a collection of other users who share a common interest, which will periodically update the user when new content related to the group is available.

Mixcloud also provides an API which users can search, upload and embed its content.

Users may also share podcasts and mixes via Facebook or Twitter.

Mobile apps are available for both Android and iOS.

In December 2018, Mixcloud announced a new form of subscription called "fan-to-creator". Thanks to this feature subscribers can support a favourite artist directly and contribute to the licensing cost of the music played in the shows. This innovation is an attempt by the company to find a new way of funding.

== Legality ==
Mixcloud prohibits its users from downloading audio content from its website for licensing reasons. Co-founder Nikhil Shah commented on this restriction: "Not offering downloads has been a challenge for us in terms of persuading the content creators to use a platform like ours."

He also compared Mixcloud to the model of its competitor Spotify: "So it's very similar to the Spotify model. Spotify's competitor is illegal downloading and they are trying to cannibalise illegal downloading by offering a streaming-only and superior alternative."

According to Mixcloud's main website, the platform is licensed only to provide its audio content through streaming, such that royalties are attributed to their respective artists.

Mixcloud also requires its users to attribute their audio uploads with correct Artist and Song metadata in order to preserve intellectual property rights.

== See also ==
- Mixcrate
- Pandora
- PLAY.FM
- Rdio
- Rhapsody
- SoundCloud
- Spotify
