= Speech compression =

Speech compression may refer to:

- Speech encoding, compression for transmission or storage, possibly to an unintelligible state, with decompression used prior to playback
- Time-compressed speech, voice compression for immediate playback, without any decompression (so that the final speech sounds faster to the listener)
