= Scrubbing (audio) =

Audio file navigation technique

In digital audio editing, scrubbing is an interaction in which a user drags a cursor or play head across a segment of a waveform to hear it. Scrubbing is a convenient way to quickly navigate an audio file, and is a common feature of modern digital audio workstations and other audio editing software. The term comes from the early days of the recording industry and refers to the process of physically moving tape reels to locate a specific point in the audio track; this gave the engineer the impression that the tape was being scrubbed, or cleaned.

== Implementations ==
Common scrubbing feedback techniques include:

Resampling
allows playback at arbitrary rates, which also pitch-shifts the audio, approximating the effect of playing audio from an analog source like tape or vinyl with a similarly varying motion
Cut-and-paste
the original signal is segmented into frames of constant width and playback is obtained by either discarding (time compression) or repeating (time expansion) some frames.
Timeline stretching
processes the audio to allow playback at arbitrary rates without changing the pitch (audio time stretching), common approaches include: the Phase Vocoder, and Time Domain Harmonic Scaling

== See also ==
- Rocking and rolling
