= TDHS =

TDHS may refer to:

- Temple De Hirsch Sinai, a Reform Jewish community with temples in Seattle and Bellevue, Washington
- The Dalles High School, The Dalles, Oregon
- Thomas Dale High School, Chester, Virginia
- Thomas Downey High School, Modesto, California
- Tilbury District High School, Tilbury, Ontario, Canada
- Time-domain harmonic scaling, an audio engineering technique
