= Pitch shifting =

Audio processing technique that alters pitch

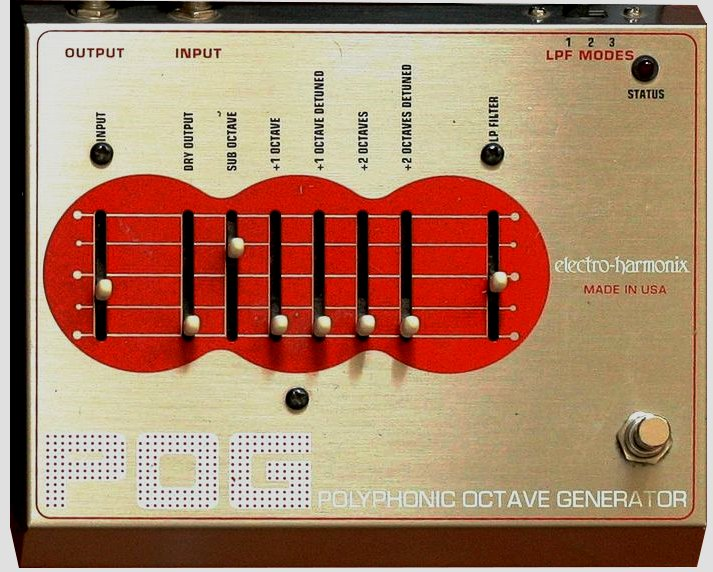
POG octave effect

Pitch shifting is a sound recording technique in which the original pitch of a sound is raised or lowered. Effects units that raise or lower pitch by a pre-designated musical interval (transposition) are known as pitch shifters.

== Pitch and time shifting ==
The simplest methods are used to increase pitch and reduce durations or, conversely, reduce pitch and increase duration. This can be done by replaying a sound waveform at a different speed than it was recorded. It could be accomplished on an early reel-to-reel tape recorder by changing the diameter of the capstan or using a different motor. As for vinyl records, placing a finger on the turntable to give friction will slow it, while giving it a "spin" can advance it. As technologies improved, motor speed and pitch control could be achieved electronically by servo drive system circuits.

== Pitch shifter and harmonizer ==
A pitch shifter is a sound effects unit that raises or lowers the pitch of an audio signal by a preset interval. For example, a pitch shifter set to increase the pitch by a fourth will raise each note three diatonic intervals above the notes actually played. Simple pitch shifters raise or lower the pitch by one or two octaves, while more sophisticated devices offer a range of interval alterations. Pitch shifters are included in most audio processors today.

A harmonizer is a type of pitch shifter that combines the pitch-shifted signal with the original to create a two or more note harmony. The Eventide H910 Harmonizer, released in 1975, was one of the first commercially available pitch-shifters and digital multi-effects units. On November 10, 1976, Eventide filed a trademark registration for "Harmonizer" and continues to maintain its rights to the Harmonizer trademark today.

In digital recording, pitch shifting is accomplished through digital signal processing. Older digital processors could often shift pitch only in post-production, whereas many modern devices using computer processing technology can change pitch values virtually in real time.

Pitch correction is a form of pitch shifting and is found in software such as Auto-Tune and Melodyne to correct intonation inaccuracies in a recording or performance. Pitch shifting may raise or lower all sounds in a recording by the same amount, whereas in practice, pitch correction may make different changes from note to note.

== DJing ==
Pitch shifting can be used in DJing for harmonic mixing, a technique of matching the musical key of tracks in a DJ mix to avoid dissonance and create harmonious mixes or mashups. If a DJ wishes to mix two tracks which are not in compatible keys, they can shift the pitch of one track so that its key is compatible with the other, allowing seamless transitions between tracks which might otherwise sound dissonant when played together.

== Notable uses ==
Numerous cartoons have used pitch shifters to produce distinctive animal voices. Alvin and the Chipmunks recordings with David Seville (aka Ross Bagdasarian) were created by recording vocal tracks at slow speeds, then playing them back at normal speeds. Voice artist Mel Blanc used pitch shifting techniques to create the voices of Tweety and Daffy Duck.

In the 1970s, reruns of shows like I Love Lucy were sped up in order to run more advertisements during commercial breaks. The Eventide H910 Harmonizer was used to downward pitch-shift the characters' voices back to normal after the episode was sped up.

South Park creators Trey Parker and Matt Stone have used pitch shifting for most of their characters throughout the show's run.

One notable early practitioner of pitch shifting in music is Chuck Berry, who used the technique to make his voice sound younger. Many of the Beatles' records from 1966 and 1967 were made by recording instrumental tracks a half-step higher and the vocals correspondingly low. Examples include "Rain", "I'm Only Sleeping", and "When I'm Sixty-Four".

Electronic musician Burial is known for including pitch-shifted samples of vocal melodies in his songs.

Goregrind and occasionally death metal use vocals that are often pitch-shifted to sound unnaturally low and guttural.

The famous bass intro to the song "Seven Nation Army" by The White Stripes, is the result of guitarist Jack White playing an electric guitar through a pitch shifting effects pedal set to an octave below. The band was a duo, who lacked a bassist and had never previously used one in any of their music, choosing instead to mimic the sound of a bass guitar.

From 1986 to 1988, American musician Prince used pitch shifting to create his “Camille” vocals.

The coda in the song “The Bewlay Brothers” by David Bowie features Bowie's voice distorted by varispeeding; this effect also appears throughout Bowie's 1967 song “The Laughing Gnome”.

== See also ==
- Audio time stretching and pitch scaling
- DigiTech Whammy
- Pitch control
- Puberphonia
