= Rocking and rolling =

Rocking and rolling (also rock and roll) is a name for cueing techniques used in sound recording and video recording, particularly in analog recordings.

In sound recording, the reels of an open reel tape machine were "rocked and rolled" by turning them back and forth by hand, to cue recordings for playback, and especially for editing, which was done by cutting and splicing the tape. With the passing of reel-to-reel tape recording into obsolescence, the technique is now scarcely used.

In video recording, video segments and programs are similarly cued by turning one or more knobs back and forth, on the panel of a recording deck or edit controller, until the desired points are located and set. Analog video on tape is also largely obsolete, although some digital interfaces continue to use cueing knobs, or their virtual equivalents.

== See also ==
- Scrubbing (audio)
