= Fade (audio engineering) =

Gradual change in level of audio signal

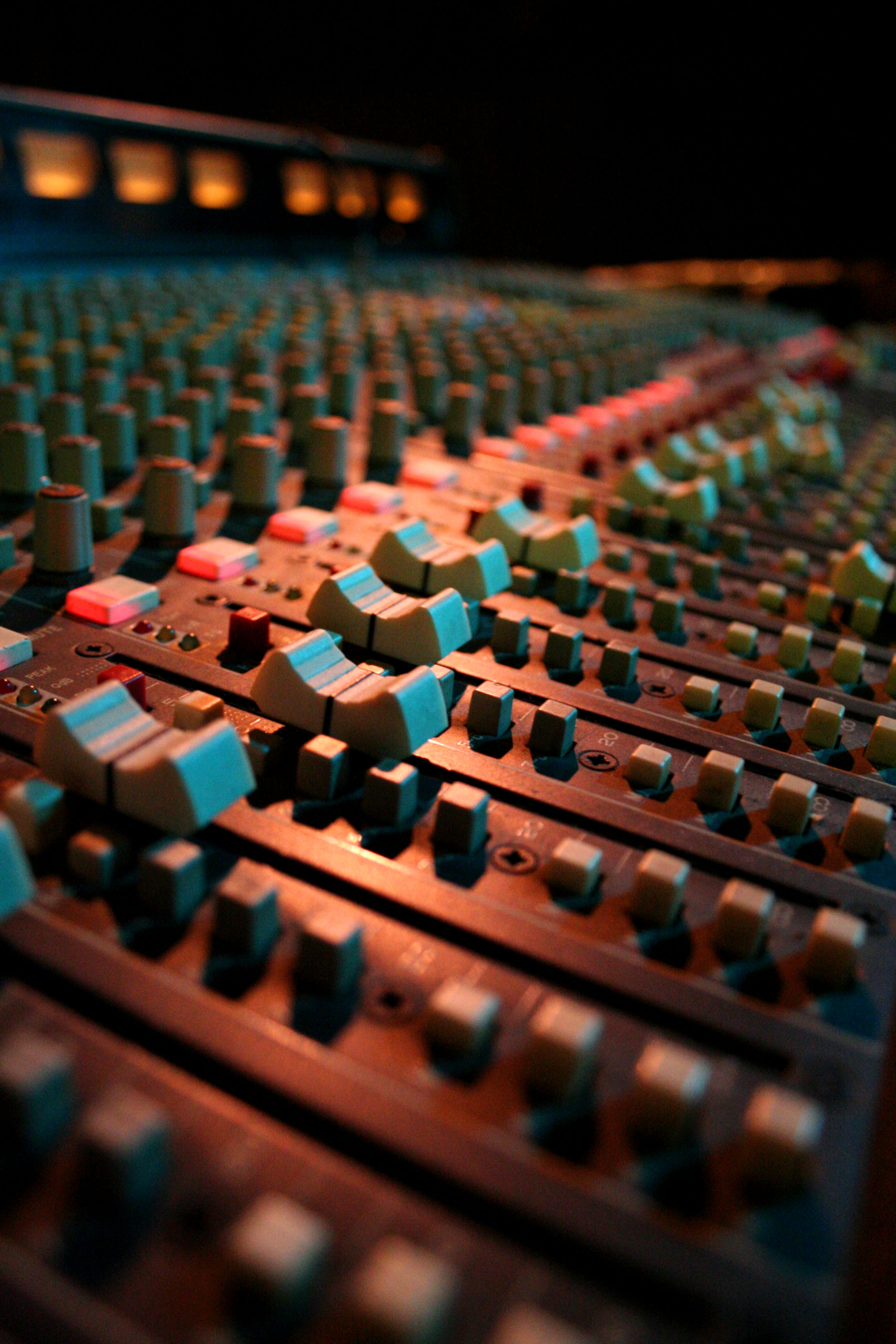
Audio mixer faders in a London pub.

In audio engineering, a fade is a gradual increase or decrease in the level of an audio signal. The term can also be used for film cinematography or theatre lighting in much the same way (see fade (filmmaking) and fade (lighting)).

In sound recording and reproduction, a song may be gradually reduced to silence at its end (fade-out), or may gradually increase from silence at the beginning (fade-in). Fading out can serve as a recording solution for pieces of music that contain no obvious ending. Quick fade-ins and -outs can also be used to change the characteristics of a sound, such as to soften the attack in vocal plosives and percussion sounds.

Professional turntablists and DJs in hip hop music use faders on a DJ mixer, notably the horizontal crossfader, in a rapid fashion while simultaneously manipulating two or more record players (or other sound sources) to create scratching and develop beats. Club DJs in house music and techno use DJ mixers, two or more sound sources (two record players, two iPods, etc.) along with a skill called beatmatching (aligning the beats and tempos of two records) to make seamless dance mixes for dancers at raves, nightclubs and dance parties.

== History ==
=== Origins and examples ===
Possibly the earliest example of a fade-out ending can be heard in Joseph Haydn's Symphony No. 45, nicknamed the "Farewell" Symphony on account of the fade-out ending. The symphony, which was written in 1772, used this device as a way of courteously asking Haydn's patron Prince Nikolaus Esterházy, to whom the symphony was dedicated, to allow the musicians to return home after a longer-than-expected stay. This was expressed by the players extinguishing their stand candles and leaving the stage one by one during the final adagio movement of the symphony, leaving only two muted violins playing. Esterházy appears to have understood the message, allowing the musicians to leave.

Gustav Holst's "Neptune, the mystic", part of the orchestral suite The Planets written between 1914 and 1916, is another early example of music having a fade-out ending during performance. Holst stipulates that the women's choruses are "to be placed in an adjoining room, the door of which is to be left open until the last bar of the piece, when it is to be slowly and silently closed", and that the final bar (scored for choruses alone) is "to be repeated until the sound is lost in the distance". Although commonplace today, the effect bewitched audiences in the era before widespread recorded sound—after the initial 1918 run-through, Holst's daughter Imogen (in addition to watching the charwomen dancing in the aisles during "Jupiter") remarked that the ending was "unforgettable, with its hidden chorus of women's voices growing fainter and fainter ... until the imagination knew no difference between sound and silence".

The technique of ending a spoken or musical recording by fading out the sound goes back to the earliest days of recording. In the era of mechanical (pre-electrical) recording, this could only be achieved by either moving the sound source away from the recording horn, or by gradually reducing the volume at which the performer(s) were singing, playing or speaking. With the advent of electrical recording, smooth and controllable fadeout effects could be easily achieved by simply reducing the input volume from the microphones using the fader on the mixing desk. The first experimental study on the effect of a fade-out showed that a version of a musical piece with fade-out in comparison to the same piece with a cold end prolonged the perceived duration by 2.4 seconds. This is called the "Pulse Continuity Phenomenon" and was measured by a tapping-along task to measure participants’ perception of pulsation.

An 1894 78 rpm record called "The Spirit of '76" features a narrated musical vignette with martial fife-and-drum that gets louder as it nears the listener, and quieter as it moves away. There are early examples that appear to bear no obvious relationship to movement. One is "Barkin' Dog" (1919) by the Ted Lewis Jazz Band. Another contender is "America" (1918), a patriotic piece by the chorus of evangelist Billy Sunday. By the early 1930s, longer songs were being put on both sides of records, with the piece fading out at the end of side one and fading back in at the beginning of side two. Records at the time held only about two to five minutes of music per side. The segue allowed for longer songs (such as Count Basie's "Miss Thing"), symphonies and live concert recordings.

However, shorter songs continued to use the fade-out for unclear reasons—for example, Fred Astaire's movie theme "Flying Down to Rio" (1933). Even using fade-out as a segue device does not seem obvious, though we certainly take it for granted today. It is possible that movies were an influence here. Fade-ins and fade-outs are often used as cinematic devices that begin and end scenes; film language that developed at the same time as these early recordings. The term fade-out itself is of cinematic origin, appearing in print around 1918. And jazz, a favorite of early records, was a popular subject of early movies too. The same could be said for radio productions. Within a single programme of a radio production, many different types of fade can be applied. When mixing from speech to music, there are a few ways that fade can be used. Here are three examples.

- Straight: the introduction has become a musical link between the music/speech that follows; additionally, the first notes of the intro can be emphasized to make it pop out more.
- Cutting the introduction: Since the first word of the vocals has to follow promptly after the cue light, it could be used to move the recording onward.
- Introduction under speech: The music is placed at the specified time on the cue; the level must be low in order for the vocals to be audible. Here, the fade-up generally occurs just before the final words in order for the cue to be given. In stage productions, the closing music is played from a predetermined time and fades up at the closing words in order to fit in exactly with the remaining program time.

Though relatively rare, songs can fade out and then fade back in. Some examples of this are "Helter Skelter" and "Strawberry Fields Forever" by The Beatles, "Suspicious Minds" by Elvis Presley, "Shine On Brightly" by Procol Harum, "Sunday Bloody Sunday" by John Lennon and Yoko Ono, "That Joke Isn't Funny Anymore" by The Smiths, "Thank You" by Led Zeppelin, "In Every Dream Home A Heartache" by Roxy Music, "It's Only Money, Pt. 2" by Argent, "The Great Annihilator" by Swans, "(Reprise) Sandblasted Skin" by Pantera, "Illumination Theory" and "At Wit's End" by Dream Theater, "Future" by Paramore, "Doomsday" by MF Doom, "Outro" by M83, "Cold Desert" by Kings of Leon, and "The Edge Of The World" by DragonForce.

=== Contemporary ===
No modern recording can be reliably identified as "the first" to use the technique. In 2003, on the (now-defunct) website Stupid Question, John Ruch listed the following recordings as possible contenders:

Bill Haley's cover version of "Rocket 88" (1951) fades out to indicate the titular car driving away. There are claims that The Beatles' "Eight Days a Week" (recorded 1964) was the first song to use the reverse effect—a fade-in. In fact, The Supremes had used this effect on their single "Come See About Me", issued a little over a month before "Eight Days a Week".

More recently: "At the meta-song level, the prevalence of pre-taped sequences (for shops, pubs, parties, concert intervals, aircraft headsets) emphasizes the importance of flow. The effect on radio pop programme form [is] a stress on continuity achieved through the use of fades, voice-over links, twin-turntable mixing and connecting jingles."

== Fade ==
A fade can be constructed so that the motion of the control (linear or rotary) from its start to end points affects the level of the signal in a different manner at different points in its travel. If there are no overlapping regions on the same track, regular fade (pre-fade / post-fade) should be used. A smooth fade is one that changes according to the logarithmic scale, as faders are logarithmic over much of their working range of 30-40 dB. If the engineer requires one region to gradually fade into another on the same track, a crossfade would be more suitable. If however the two regions are on different tracks, fade-ins and fade-outs will be applied. A fade-out can be accomplished without letting the sound's distance increase, however this is also something it can do. The perceived distance increase can be attributed to a diminishing level of timbral detail, not the result of a decreasing dynamic level. A listener's interest can be withdrawn from a sound that is faded at the lower end since the ear accepts a more prompt rounding off. The fade-in can be used as a device that separates the listener from the scene. An example of a mini fade out, of about a second or two, is a sustained bass note left to die down.

=== Shapes ===
The shape of a regular fade and a crossfade can be shaped by an audio engineer. Shape implies that you can change the rate at which the level change occurs over the length of the fade. Different types of preset fades shapes include linear, logarithmic, exponential and S-curve.

==== Linear ====
The simplest of fade curves is the linear curve and it is normally the default fade. It takes a straight line and introduces a curve. This curve represents an equal degree by which the gain increases or decreases during the length of the fade. A linear fade-in curve makes it sound as though the volume increases sharply at the beginning, and more gradually towards the end. The same principle applies to a fade-out, where a gradual drop in volume can be perceived in the beginning, and the fade gets more abrupt towards the end. Because of the initial drop in perceived volume, the linear shape is ideal if there is a natural ambience or reverb present in the audio. When applied, it shortens the ambience. Also, if the music requires an accelerating effect, this linear curve can also be applied. This type of fade is not very natural sounding. The principle of a linear crossfade is: at the beginning of the fade, the perceived volume drops more quickly; one can see at the halfway point (in the middle of the crossfade) that the perceived volume drops below 50%. This is a very noticeable drop in volume. Also, if the control can move from position 0 to 100, and the percentage of the signal that is allowed to pass equals the position of the control (i.e., 25% of the signal is allowed to pass when the control is 25% of the physical distance from the 0 point to the 100 point). At the midpoint of the fade, the effect of a linear crossfade is that both the sounds are below half of their maximum perceived volume, and as a result, the sum of the two fades will be below the maximum level of either. This is not applicable when the two sounds are on different levels and the crossfade time is long enough. In turn, if the crossfade is short (for example, on a single note), the dip of the volume in the middle of the crossfade can be quite noticeable.

The level of the signal as a function of time, $L(t)$, after applying a linear fade-in can be modeled as follows:

$$L(t) = L_0\left(\frac{t - t_s}{t_e - t_s}\right),$$

where:

- $L_0$ is the original level of the signal,
- $t$ is any time in the fade,
- $t_s$ is the start time of the fade,
- $t_e$ is the end time of the fade.

Similarly, the level after applying a linear fade-out can be modeled as follows:

$$L(t) = L_0\left(1 - \frac{t - t_s}{t_e - t_s}\right).$$

==== Logarithmic ====
Another type of curve is called the logarithmic ratio (also known as audio taper), or an inverse-logarithmic ratio. This curve more closely matches human hearing, with finer control at lower levels, increasing dramatically past the 50% point. Since the perceived volume of a sound has a logarithmic relationship with its level, the logarithmic fade sounds consistent and smooth over the whole duration of the fade. This makes this curve useful for fading standard pieces of music. It is best used on a long fade-out since the fade has a perceived linear nature. Also, a fade-out sounds very neutral when incorporated to parts of music with natural ambience. In crossfades, this type of curve sounds very natural. When this curve is applied, the perceived volume of the fade's midpoint is at about 50% of the maximum – when the two sections are summed, the output volume is fairly constant.

==== Exponential ====
The exponential curve shape is in many ways the precise opposite of the logarithmic curve. The fade-in works as follows: it increases in volume slowly and then it shoots up very quickly at the end of the fade. The fade-out drops very quickly (from the maximum volume) and then declines slowly again over the duration of the fade. Simply stated, a linear fade could thus be seen as an exaggerated version of an exponential fade in terms of the apparent volume. Thus, the impression that would be gathered from an exponential curve's fade would sound as though the sound was rapidly accelerating toward the listener. Natural ambiance can also be repressed by using an exponential fade-out. A crossfade, in the exponential shape, will have a perceivable dip in the middle, which is very undesirable in music and vocals. This depends largely on the length of the crossfade; a long crossfade on ambient sounds can sound perfectly satisfactory (the dip can add a little breath to the music). Exponential crossfades (or a curve with a similar shape) have a smaller drop in the middle of the fade.

==== S-curve ====
The S-curve shape has a mixture of qualities from the previously mentioned curves. The level of the sound is 50% at the midpoint, but before and after the midpoint, the shape is not linear. There are also two types of S-curves. The traditional S-curve fade-in has attributes of the exponential curve at the beginning; from the midpoint to the end, it is more logarithmic in nature. A traditional S-curve fade-out is logarithmic from the beginning up to the midpoint, then its attributes are based on the exponential curve from the midpoint to the end. This is true for the situation in reverse as well (for both fade-in and fade-out). Crossfading with S-curves diminishes the amount of time that both sounds are playing simultaneously. This ensures that the edits sound like a direct cut when the two edits meet, adding an extra smoothness to the edited regions. The second type of S-curve is more applicable to longer crossfades, as both signals are audible for as long as possible. There is a short period at the start of each of the crossfades where the outgoing sound drops toward 50% quickly (with the incoming sound rising just as fast to 50%). This acceleration of sound slows, and both sounds will appear as if they are at the same level for most of the crossfade before the changeover happens.

The level after applying an S-curve fade-in can be modeled as follows:

$$L(t) = L_0 \sin^2\left(\frac{\pi}{2} \times \frac{t - t_s}{t_e - t_s}\right).$$

Similarly, the level after applying an S-curve fade-out can be modeled as follows:

$$L(t) = L_0 \cos^2\left(\frac{\pi}{2} \times \frac{t - t_s}{t_e - t_s}\right).$$

=== Adjustments ===
Digital audio workstations (DAWs) provide the ability to change the shape of logarithmic, exponential, and S-curve fades and crossfades. Changing the shape of a logarithmic fade will change how soon the sound will rise above 50%, and then how long it takes for the end of the fade-out to drop below 50% once again. With exponential fades, the shape change will affect the shape in reverse, to the shape of the logarithmic fade. In the S-curve's traditional form, the shape determines how quickly the change can occur and determines the time it takes for both the sounds to get to a nearly equal level.

Appropriate fade-in time for a gentle linear fade can be around 500 ms; for the fade-out 500 ms would also be effective. To clear up plosive sounds created through vocals, a quick fade-in with a very short time of around 10 ms can be used.

== Crossfading ==
DJ Qbert in Rainbow Warehouse in Birmingham (Video with close-up photography at the DJ mixer, though without sound). From 1:36, heavy use of the crossfader can be seen.

A crossfader on a DJ mixer essentially functions like two faders connected side-by-side, but in opposite directions. A crossfader is typically mounted horizontally, so that the DJ can slide the fader from the extreme left (this provides 100% of sound source A) to the extreme right (this provides 100% of sound source B), move the fader to the middle (this is a 50/50 mix of sources A and B), or adjust the fader to any point in between. It allows a DJ to fade one source out while fading another source in at the same time. In the perfect case, the crossfade would keep a constant output level. However, there is no standard on how this should be achieved.

The technique of crossfading is also used in audio engineering as a mixing technique, particularly with instrumental solos. A mix engineer will often record two or more takes of a vocal or instrumental part and create a final version which is a composite of the best passages of these takes by crossfading between takes.

There are many software applications that implement crossfades, for instance, burning-software for the recording of audio-CDs and most DAWs have this function and is available on samplers. The purpose of a cross-fade is to create a smooth changeover between two pieces of audio.

Velocity-based crossfading may be available in samplers. These types of crossfades, based on note velocity, allow two or more samples to be assigned to one note or range of notes. The samples represent the timbre of the sampled instrument at loud and soft levels.

A crossfade can either be used between two unrelated pieces of music or between two sounds that are similar; in both of these cases, one would like the sound to be one continuous sound without noticeable dips or bumps in volume. A crossfade between two very different pieces of music does not present particular challenges. In the case of a crossfade between two sounds that are similar, phase-cancellation can become an issue; in an extreme case, there will potentially be silence in the middle of the crossfade. More commonly, a crossfade will result in a gradual reduction in the amount of the sample whose pitch is lower, and an increase will be found on the pitch that is higher. The longer a crossfade, the more likely a problem will occur. One also does not want the effect of the crossfade to be very prominent in the middle of the notes, since if different notes are between the edit point, there will be a time when both of the sounds can be heard simultaneously.

While DJ pioneers such as Francis Grasso had used basic faders to transition between two records as far back as the late 1960s, they typically had separate faders for each channel. Grandmaster Flash is often credited with the invention of the first crossfader by sourcing parts from a junkyard in the Bronx. It was initially an on/off toggle switch from an old microphone that he transformed into a left/right switch which allowed him to switch from one turntable to another, thereby avoiding a break in the music. However, the earliest documented commercial example was designed by Richard Wadman, one of the founders of the British company Citronic. The model SMP101 mixer, made about 1977, had a crossfader that doubled as a L/R balance control or a crossfade between two inputs.

=== Crossfade shapes ===
When crossfading two signals, the two fade curves can employ any of the shapes listed above (see #Shapes), such as linear, exponential, S-curve, etc. When the goal is to have the perceived loudness of the combined mix signal stay fairly constant across the full range of the crossfade, special equal power shapes must be used. Equal power shapes are based on audio power principles, particularly the fact that the power of an audio signal is proportional to the square of the amplitude. Many equal power shapes have the property that the midpoint of the fade provides an amplitude multiplier of 0.707 (square root of one half) for both signals. A variety of equal power shapes are available, and the optimal shape will generally depend on the amount of correlation between the two signals. An example pair of curves that keep power equal across the mix are $\sqrt{m}$ and $\sqrt{1 - m}$, where m is the crossfade position and ranges from 0 to 1.

Equal power shapes typically have the sum of their amplitude (in the middle of the crossfade) exceeding the nominal maximum amplitude (1.0), which may produce clipping in some circumstances. If that is a concern, then equal gain shapes should be used that are designed so the two curves always sum to 1.

In the digital signal processing realm, the term power curve is often used to designate crossfade shapes, particularly for equal power shapes.

== Fader ==
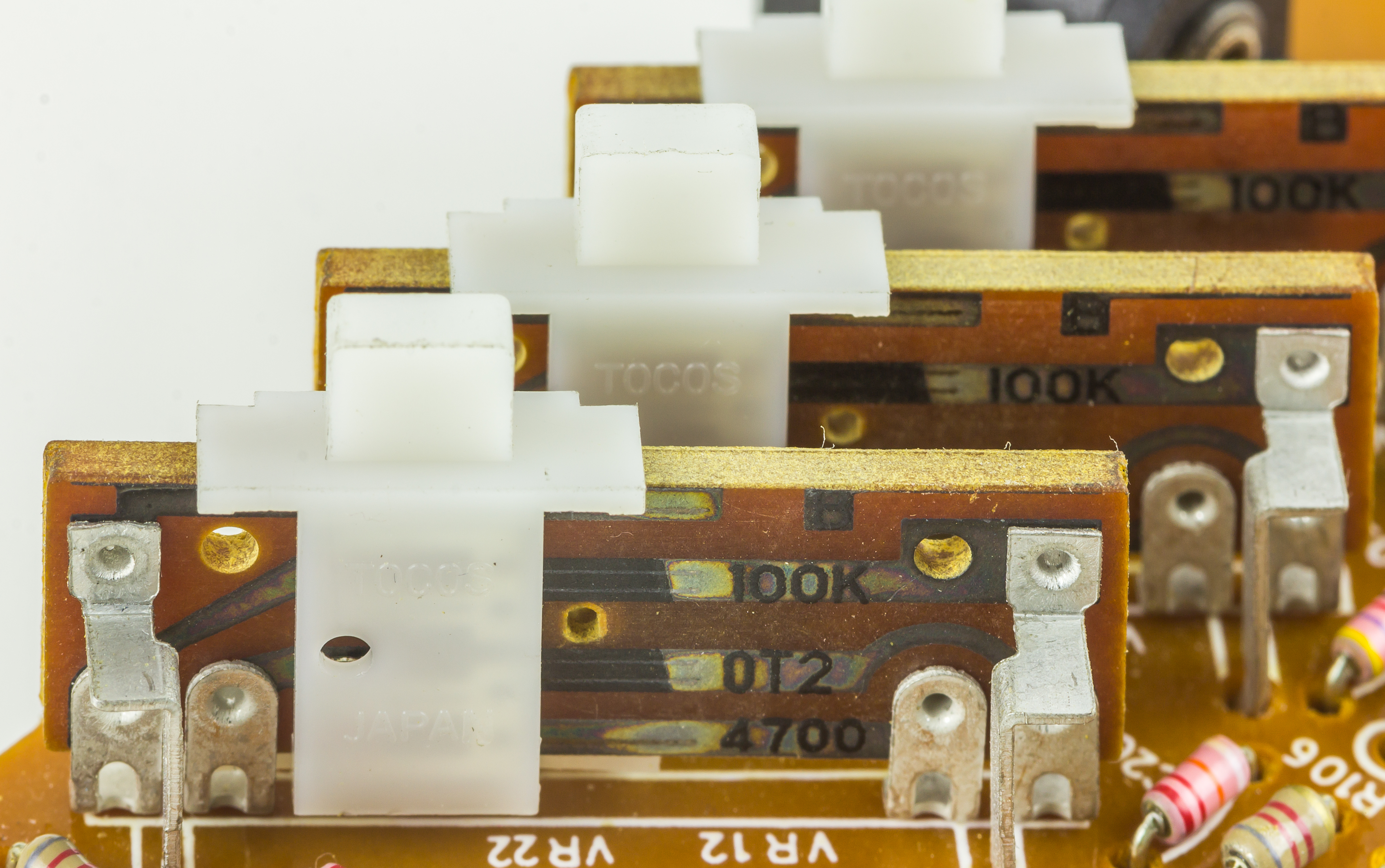
3 faders used as graphic equalizer in a personal cassette player

A fader is any device used for fading, especially when it is a knob or button that slides along a track or slot. It is principally a variable resistance or potentiometer. A contact can move from one end to another. As this movement takes place, the resistance of the circuit can either increase or decrease. At one end the resistance of the scale is at 0 and at the other side, it is infinite. "The law of the fader is near-logarithmic over much of its range, which means that a scale of decibels can be made linear (or close to it) over a working range of perhaps 60 dB. If the resistance were to increase according to the same law beyond this, it would be twice as long before reaching a point where the signal is negligible. But the range below -50 dB is of little practical use, so here the rate of fade increases rapidly to the final cut-off".

A knob which rotates is usually not considered a fader, although it is electrically and functionally equivalent. Some small mixers use knobs rather than faders, as do a small number of DJ mixers. A fader can be either analogue (e.g., a potentiometer), directly controlling the resistance or impedance to the source; or digital, numerically controlling a digital signal processor (DSP). An analogue fader can also be used as a control for a voltage controlled amplifier, which has the same effect on the sound as any other fader, but the audio signal does not pass through the fader itself.

=== Digital ===
Digital faders are also referred to as virtual faders, since they can be viewed on the screen of a digital audio workstation. Modern high-end digital mixers and mix control surfaces often feature motorized faders. Such faders can be multi-use and will jump to the correct position for a selected function or saved setting. Motorized faders can be automated, so that when timecode is presented to the equipment, the fader will move according to a previously performed path. The console's computer will update the console's controls on playback. This will be done from memory at the same speed. A full-function automation system will continuously scan the console, many times per second, in order to incorporate new settings. While this scan is in progress, the stored representation of the previous scan will be compared to that of the fader's current position. If the fader has been moved by the operator, the new position will be identified, and the memory updated.

The advantage of working with mix automation is that only one engineer can perform the job with minimal effort.

=== Types ===
Many DJ equipment manufacturers offer different mixers for different purposes, with different fader styles, e.g., scratching, beatmixing, and cut mixing. Some mixers have crossfade curve selector switches allowing the DJ to select the type of crossfade desired. Experienced DJs are also able to crossfade between tracks using the channel faders.

== Pre-fader, post-fader ==
On a mixer with auxiliary sends, the send mixes are configured pre-fader or post-fader. If a send mix is configured pre-fader, then changes to the main channel strip fader do not affect the send mix. In live sound reinforcement, this is useful for stage monitor mixes where changes in the Front of House channel levels would distract the musicians. If a send mix is configured post-fader, then the level sent to the send mix follows changes to the main channel strip fader. This is useful for reverberation and other signal processor effects. An example of this is when an engineer would like to add some reverb to the vocals. When the auxiliary send to the reverb is configured post-fader, adjusting the fader adjusts the vocal level in the main mix and the vocal level sent to the reverb.

== Pre-fader listen and after-fader listen ==
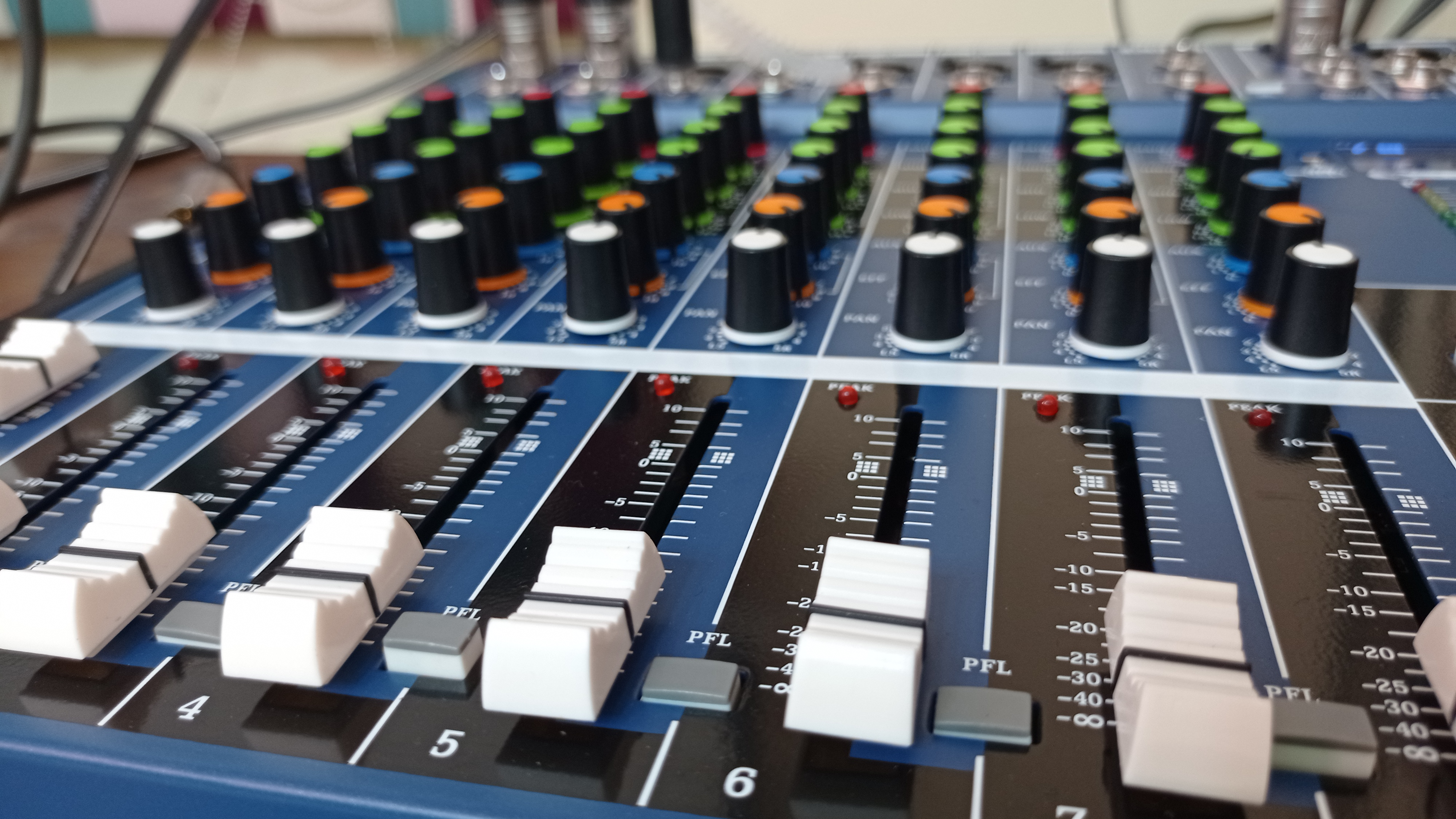
Pre-fader listen switches on a Yamaha mixing console, next to the fader of each channel.

Pre-fader listen (PFL) and after-fader listen (AFL) are functions found on a primary monitor function.

On an analogue mixing console, the PFL switch routes the incoming signal of a channel to a PFL bus. This bus is sent to the monitor mix or the headphones mix, allowing for monitoring an incoming signal before it is sent to the main output. This pre-fade listen is valuable since it allows one to listen through headphones in order to hear what the pre-faded part sounds like, while the studio loudspeaker is being used to monitor the rest of the program. When the mixer is equipped with VU meters, the PFL allows the audio engineer to visually monitor an audio source without hearing it and adjust its input gain.

Pre-fade is used to listen to channels before they have been faded and can also be used for talkback. After-fade listen only gets its information later. The choice of listen or level will depend on the user's interest: either with the quality or content of the signal or with the signal's level. PFL takes place just before the fader and has a joint channel and monitoring function. PFL sends the channel's signal path to the pre-fade bus. The bus is picked up in the monitor module and made accessible as a substitute signal that is sent to the mixer output. Automatic PFL, a widely available feature, automatically makes this substitution.

In radio applications, PFL allows the radio presenter to listen to the source before it is faded on air, allowing the presenter to check the source's incoming level and make sure it is accurate.

== See also ==
- Gapless playback
- Harmonic mixing
