= Seekda =

Software company

Seekda GmbH
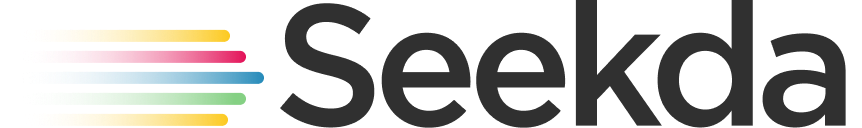
- Company type: GmbH
- Industry: eTourism; Internet, Software
- Founded: 2007
- Headquarters: Vienna, Austria
- Products: IT solutions for the eTourism
- Number of employees: 50
- Website: www.seekda.com

Seekda is an Austrian web service search engine. It was created by Seekda GmbH, a hospitality management software company and a provider in the field of e-tourism.

== Background ==
Established in 2007, Seekda GmbH was based in Innsbruck, Austria in 2010. The company began keeping track of web services in 2006. The Montreal-based company Valsoft in August 2023 purchased Seekda, which was based in Vienna, Austria.

Seekda's web crawler identifies web services that it subsequently categorises into an ontology. The crawler directs its attention to Web Services Description Language (WSDL) and RESTful services. Finding every web service is Seekda's goal. Seekda monitors services from numerous areas including shopping, entertainment, sports, maps, and weather. In August 2011, Seekda had saved 7,739 providers and 28,606 services. The scholar Rozita Mirmotalebi and her coauthors processed the services, eliminating those corresponding to dead links. They found that there were 1,208 services and 537 providers remaining. In the Web Services Description Language (WSDL) format, Seekda provides interface descriptions for web services. Its web crawlers find WSDL descriptions on the Internet for indexing.

Seekda has a web service search engine that runs queries over the data the crawler fetched. Every web service returned in the results has the service's name, its provider, a brief description, tags, and the country where it is accessed. Search results can be ordered by the web service's country and its provider, among other characteristics. Seekda monitors the availability of the services it has tracked and makes the data available in search results. The "Availability" tab displays the "average/connect time" (how long it took to start connecting to the service), the "average/response time" (how long it took for the full response to be delivered), the "connect errors and timeouts", and the "read errors and timeouts".

Seekda's goal is to be a go-between for a hotel and platforms that promote their business. Seekda follows the OpenTravel Alliance (OTA) data model, which offers a framework for traveling industry elements like flights, hotels, and tickets. Seekda then maps and persists "the OTA elements to target channel services" like Expedia. A hotel may want to integrate their web service with several websites to promote their business. Computer tools handle this when the hotel maps their service's data model to the OTA. In the past, a hotel had to reach out to each advertising platform they want to use which was a labour-intensive process. "Seekda! connect", a primary product from the company, seeks to automate the process. Instead of having to reach out to each advertising platform, a hotel can use Seekda! connect, which handles the integration. The hotel can provide attributes about their rooms, when they are open, their amenities, and their rules. The hotel configures the room data (including cost and capacity) which is encoded in XML following the OTA data model. Seekda! connect sends the information to the advertising platforms, after which customers are able to find rooms via both the hotel's web page and the advertising platforms.

== Reception ==
The author Jan Christian Krause said that Seekda's data is a valid sample of a system integration platform for web services owing to the large quantity of operations sourced from numerous web services. Elena Simperl and her coauthors wrote, "By pre-filtering the Web content and indexing Web API specific features, seekda manages the largest set of Web APIs known and make comparison easier through a unified presentation."

The scholar Bin Xu and his coauthors called Seekda "the most comprehensive search engine" for web services. They criticised Seeka for not providing any search options beyond keyword search, compromising the search quality's accuracy. Using the example of an engineer conducting a Seekda search for "send email", they said Seekda's top web service result was SMS, which is inaccurate. Charles Petrie said in IEEE Internet Computing, "Seekda is possibly the best product of this kind out there. But you see the problem, don't you?" He was critical of how Seekda failed to make it clear to users what certain fields meant from WSDL service search results. The fields need to be fill in as part of a message the user transmitted to a WSDL service.

== Bibliography ==
- Fensel, Dieter; Facca, Federico Michele; Simperl, Elena; Toma, Ioan (2011). "Seekda: The Business Point of View". Semantic Web Services. Heidelberg: Springer Berlin. doi:10.1007/978-3-642-19193-0_14. ISBN 978-3-642-19192-3.
