= Mixed In Key =

Windows and Macintosh software

Mixed In Key LLC
- Type: Private
- Industry: Music software
- Founded: Washington DC, United States (2006)
- Headquarters: Miami Beach, United States
- Area served: Worldwide
- Products: Mixed In Key, Platinum Notes, Mashup
- Website: www.mixedinkey.com

Mixed In Key (also known as MIK) is Windows and Macintosh software that simplifies a DJ technique called harmonic mixing. Mixed In Key analyses MP3 and WAV files and determines the musical key of every file. Knowing the key, DJs can use music theory (such as the Circle of Fifths) to play songs in a harmonically pleasing order. The software helps to solve Mixed In Key's software was developed to provide a Windows interface for the toner key detection algorithm created by zplane.development. The original tONaRT algorithm created by zplane.development had a simple Windows-based demo which could not process multiple audio files at once. Yakov Vorobyev created a simple C# .NET Windows application that could batch-process multiple files. he first version was released on March 25, 2006. Soon after, work on Mac OS X began, and on June 4, 2006, the first version of Mac OS X was released.

Since May 2007, Mixed In Key, LLC has improved the key detection algorithm by combining tONaRT with a custom in-house algorithm. Mixed In Key was granted a patent on this algorithm. The new algorithm was released in Version 3.0. The latest version (in April 2022) is 10.0.

Ali "Dubfire" Shirazinia from Deep Dish was a big influence on the development of the Mac OS X version by providing feedback to the development team. After the Mac OS X version was released, Ali used Mixed In Key to help sequence songs for his Global Underground 31 Taipei album.

== Products ==
All three suites of Mixed In Key's software, Mixed In Key, Platinum Notes, and Mashup, are available for both PCs and Macs.

Mixed In Key is the original software from Mixed In Key LLC, the software analyzes the harmonies and melodies of the selected music. For every track, it shows the musical key and helps choose tracks that are harmonically compatible with each other. Mixed In Key works with Traktor, Serato, Pioneer CDJs, Ableton Live and all other DJ apps. The software is used by the likes of David Guetta and Kaskade. Other artists include Paul van Dyk, Armin van Buuren, Sebastian Ingrosso, Sasha, Grammy-winning producer Ali "Dubfire" from Deep Dish, Pete Tong from BBC Radio 1, trance producers Blank & Jones, Above & Beyond, High Contrast, Nick Warren, and BT.

Platinum Notes was the second software suite release. It allows the user to drop in music files. Platinum Notes then makes the tracks acoustically perfect, by using studio filters to process the files. The software corrects for pitch, improves volume, and makes the file ready to play anywhere.

Mashup is Mixed In Key's most recent addition to its offerings. The software helps beatmatch tracks and saves results to new MP3 files. Files then can be made into a podcast.

== Controversy ==
Mixed In Key has faced criticism over its decision to require an internet connection in versions following Version 2.5. While numerous users have identified this as a deterring and unfair form of copy-protection, Mixed In Key employees have responded, claiming that the new requirement has nothing to do with piracy, stating, "an internet connection is needed to analyze new files because Mixed In Key uses very expensive technology that is not available in 'offline' mode."

== Allen & Heath Partnership ==
On December 22, 2006, Mixed In Key LLC announced a partnership with Allen & Heath to provide co-branded versions of Mixed In Key known as XONE Mixed In Key. Mixed In Key continued to sell "Original" versions of the software. Color scheme is the only difference between the two versions.

== Award Nominations ==
DJ Magazine awarded Mixed In Key "Best DJ Tool of 2008" award, and previously nominated Mixed In Key for the "Most Innovative Product" in 2007. I-DJ Magazine has reviewed the product in Summer 2007 and gave it the "I-DJ Approved Innovation" award.

In 2009, Mixed In Key was nominated for Best New Product of the Year for the 24th Annual International Dance Music Awards, losing only to the iPhone 3G.

== See also ==
- Harmonic mixing
- Music Theory
- DJing
- Music software
- Mashup
