= Flex (club) =

Nightclub in Vienna

Coordinates: 48°13′05″N 16°22′14″E

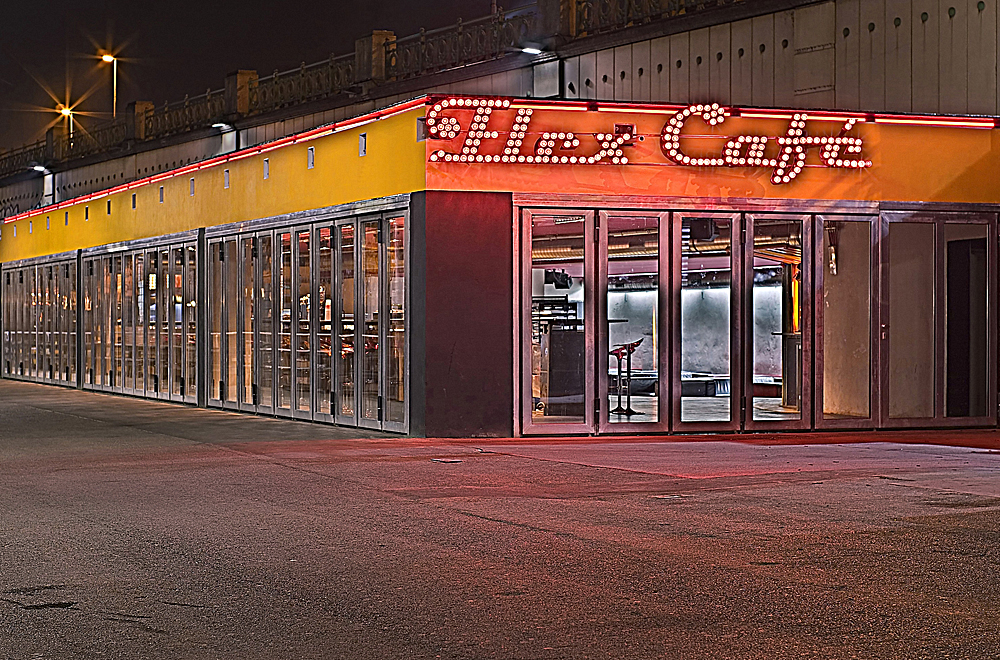
Flex-Cafe

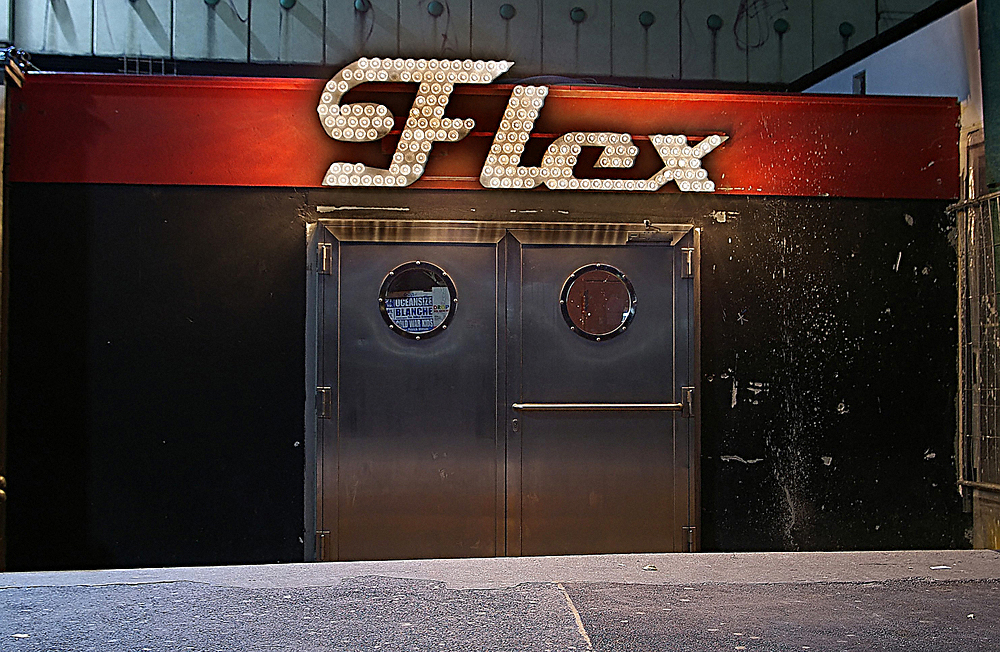
Entrance

Flex is a nightclub in Vienna. It is located between underground station Schottenring and Augartenbrücke. Many international and Austrian music acts and DJs, such as Pete Doherty, Juliette and the Licks and Arcade Fire, have performed in Flex. There have been hundreds of visits from drum and bass DJs like: Pendulum, High Contrast, DJ Marky, Aphrodite, Patifee, DJ Hype, Logistics, Leopoi, and others. According to the annual rating of German music magazine Spex Flex has been among the best nightclubs in Europe for years. The soundsystem is also widely considered one of the best.
