= Rabiner =

Rabiner is a surname. Notable people with the surname include:

- Igor Rabiner (born 1973), Russian journalist
- Lawrence Rabiner (born 1943), American electrical engineer
