= Techboomers =

Educational website

- Techboomers non official logo

- Screenshot of Techboomers official website
- Website type: Educational
- Website: techboomers.com
- Registration: Not required

Tech Life Unity (formerly Techboomers) is an educational website that teaches older adults and inexperienced Internet users how to use various websites and Internet-based applications.

The site was founded by current CEO Steve Black. Prior to Techboomers, Black had run Suited Media where he founded the first social network for poker players called Pokerspace.com. He later became a SEO consultant, working with startups in Southern Ontario and California. He founded Techboomers after his parents and older relatives would come to him for advice on using digital technology.

Tech Life Unity includes tutorial and videos to help teach lessons on how to use websites such as Facebook, YouTube, Netflix and Spotify. The site is designed with larger fonts and drop down menus to make it easier to read and navigate. A notable feature documented by the International Business Times is the site helps inexperienced users close and delete their accounts and user profiles on various sites.
