= Beatmatching =

DJing technique

Alignment of beats in the beatmatching process

Beatmatching or pitch cue is a DJ technique of pitch shifting or time stretching an upcoming track to match its tempo to that of the currently playing track, and to adjust them such that the beats (and, usually, the bars) are synchronized—e.g. the kicks and snares in two house records hit at the same time when both records are played simultaneously. Beatmatching is a component of beatmixing which employs beatmatching combined with equalization, attention to phrasing and track selection in an attempt to make a single mix that flows together and has a good structure.

Beatmatching is a core technique for DJing electronic dance music, and it is standard practice in clubs to keep a constant beat throughout the night, even if DJs change in the middle.

== Technique ==
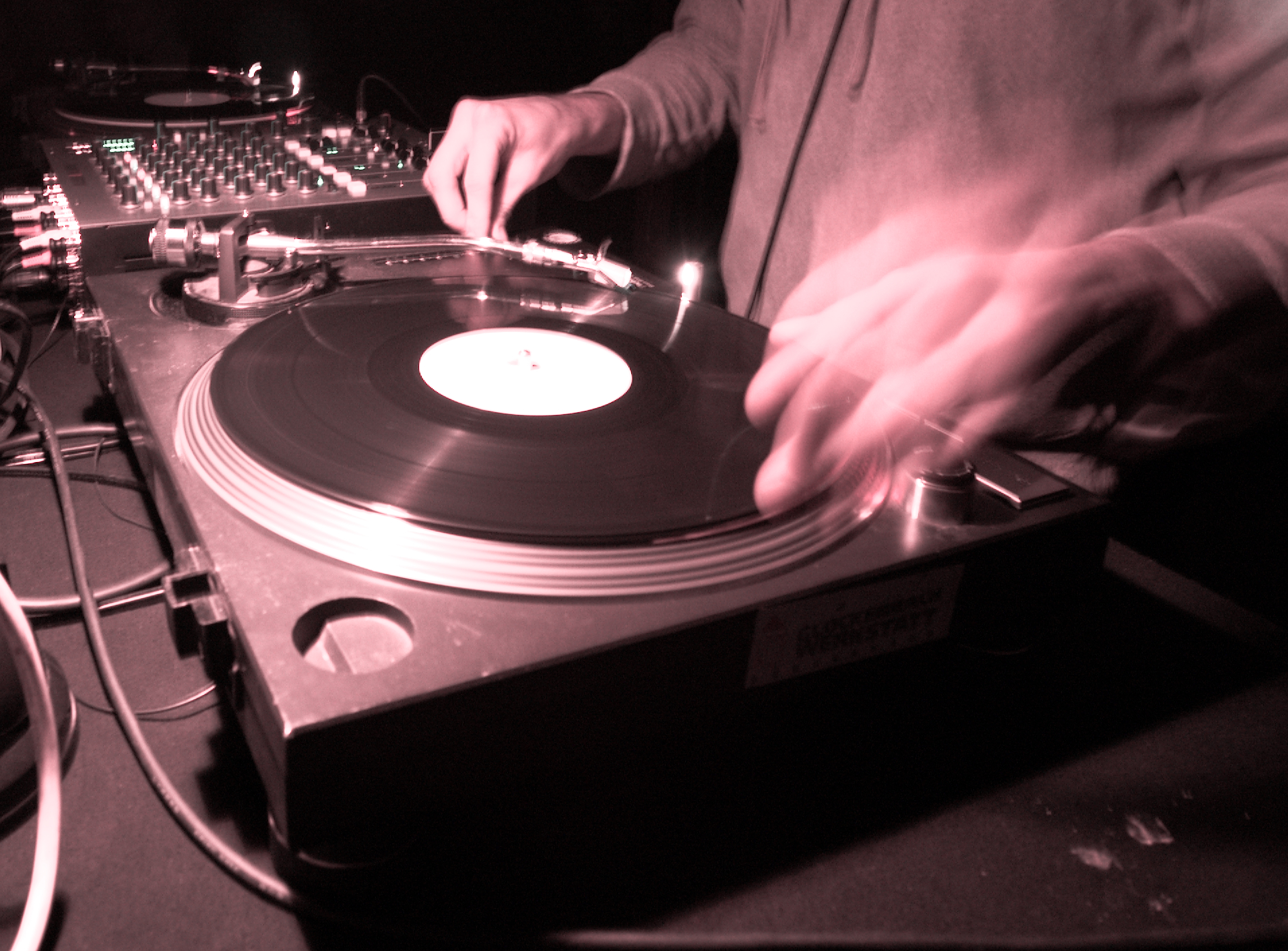
Pitch adjustment and beatmatching on a Technics SL-1210MK2 turntable; corresponds to steps 2–5 in the listed instructions.

The beatmatching technique consists of the following steps:

1. While a record is playing, start a second record playing, but only monitored through headphones, not being fed to the main PA system. Use gain (or trim) control on the mixer to match the levels of the two records.
2. Restart and slip-cue the new record at the right time, on beat with the record currently playing.
3. If the beat on the new record hits before the beat on the current record, then the new record is too fast; reduce the pitch and manually slow the speed of the new record to bring the beats back in sync.
4. If the beat on the new record hits after the beat on the current record, then the new record is too slow; increase the pitch and manually increase the speed of the new record to bring the beats back in sync.
5. Continue this process until the two records are in sync with each other. It can be difficult to sync the two records perfectly, so manual adjustment of the records is necessary to maintain the beat synchronization.
6. Gradually fade in parts of the new track while fading out the old track. While in the mix, ensure that the tracks are still synchronized, adjusting the records if needed.
7. The fade can be repeated several times, for example, from the first track, fade to the second track, then back to first, then to second again.

One of the key things to consider when beatmatching is the tempo of both songs, and the musical theory behind the songs. Attempting to beatmatch songs with completely different beats per minute (BPM) will result in one of the songs sounding too fast or too slow.

When beatmatching, a popular technique is to vary the equalization of both tracks. For example, when the kicks are occurring on the same beat, a more seamless transition can occur if the lower frequencies are taken out of one of the songs, and the lower frequencies of the other song is boosted. Doing so creates a smoother transition.

=== Pitch and tempo ===
The pitch and tempo of a track are normally linked together: spin a disc 5% faster and both pitch and tempo will be 5% higher. However, some modern DJ software can change pitch and tempo independently using time-stretching and pitch-shifting, allowing harmonic mixing. There is also a feature in modern DJ software which may be called "master tempo" or "key adjust" which changes the tempo while keeping the original pitch.

== History ==
Francis Grasso was one of the first people to beatmatch in the late 1960s, being taught the technique by Bob Lewis.

These days beat-matching is considered central to DJing, and features making it possible are a requirement for DJ-oriented players. In 1978, the Technics SL-1200MK2 turntable was released, whose comfortable and precise sliding pitch control and high torque direct drive motor made beat-matching easier and it became the standard among DJs. With the advent of the compact disc, DJ-oriented compact disc players with pitch control and other features enabling beat-matching (and sometimes scratching), dubbed CDJs, were introduced by various companies. More recently, software with similar capabilities has been developed to allow manipulation of digital audio files stored on computers using turntables with special vinyl records (e.g. Final Scratch, M-Audio Torq, Serato Scratch Live) or computer interface (e.g. Traktor DJ Studio, Mixxx, VirtualDJ). Other software including algorithmic beat-matching is Ableton Live, which allows for realtime music manipulation and deconstruction. Freeware software such as Rapid Evolution can detect the beats per minute and determine the percent BPM difference between songs.

Most modern DJ hardware and software now offer a "sync" feature which automatically adjusts the tempo between tracks being mixed so the DJ no longer needs to beatmatch manually.

== See also ==
- DJ mix
- Harmonic mixing
- Mashup
- Segue
