= Segue =

Transition from one topic to another

A segue (/ˈsɛɡweɪ/ SEG-way; Italian: [ˈseːɡwe]; lit. 'follows') is a transition from one topic or section to the next.

== In music ==
In music, segue is a direction to the performer. It means continue (the next section) without a pause. The term attacca is used synonymously. For written music, it implies a transition from one section to the next without any break. In improvisation, it is often used for transitions created as a part of the performance, leading from one section to another.

In recorded music, a segue sometimes means a seamless change between one song and another, sometimes achieved through beatmatching, especially on dance and disco recordings. However, as noted by composer John Williams in the liner notes for his Star Wars soundtrack album, a series of musical ideas can be juxtaposed with no transitions whatsoever. Arrangements that involve or create the effect of a classical musical suite, may be used in many pieces or progressive rock recordings, but by definition, a segue does not involve a bridging transition--it is an abrupt change of musical idea. With breakless joins of the elements in his albums Frank Zappa made extensive use of the segue technique. This was first used in 1966 on Zappa's Freak Out!, and a year later on the Beatles' Sgt. Pepper's Lonely Hearts Club Band. Some album notations distinguish track listings through the use of symbols, such as a >, →, or / to indicate songs that flow seamlessly. The alternative rock band Failure separates these musical transitions into individual tracks, which are simply given numerical distinctions such as Segue 1. This system began with their 1996 album Fantastic Planet.

In live performance, a segue can occur during a jam session, where the improvisation of the end of one song progresses into a new song. Segues can even occur between groups of musicians during live performance. For example, as one band finishes its set, members of the following act replace members of the first band one by one, until a complete band swap occurs.

In some Brazilian musical styles, where it is called "emendar" ("to splice"), in particular in Samba and Forró Pé de Serra, it is very commonly used in live performances, creating sets that usually last around 20 minutes but can sometimes take more than an hour, switching seamlessly between different songs. The larger rhythm groups of bands, with up to ten percussionists in Samba for example, facilitate the switching of one song to another, as the percussionists keep the rhythm or beat going while the pitch instruments prepare the harmonical transition to the next song, often with just one pitch instrument leading this transition. In Forró trios, where the only pitch instrument (apart from the voice) is the accordion (which plays together with two percussionists), the accordionist usually "puxa" ("pulls") the next song as soon as the previous has finished.

== Broadcast media ==
In audio/visual media, a segue is a transition from a song, scene or topic to another one. A segue allows the disc jockey, director or show host to naturally proceed from one song or scene or topic to another without jarring the audience. A good segue makes the transition look natural and effortless, such as from one live event to another. In sports media, two games within the same arena or stadium may be airing fairly close to one another. In order to give the production crew a break, a segue show may involve sports announcers or reporters discussing or giving interviews in relation to the previous or upcoming game.

== See also ==
- Beatmatching
- Beatmixing
- Derailment (thought disorder)
- Gapless playback
- Harmonic mixing
- Interstitial program
- Match cut
