= Time-domain harmonic scaling =

Time-domain harmonic scaling (TDHS) is a method for time-scale modification of speech (or other audio signals), allowing the apparent rate of speech articulation to be changed without affecting the pitch-contour and the time-evolution of the formant structure. TDHS differs from other time-scale modification algorithms in that time-scaling operations are performed in the time domain (not the frequency domain). TDHS was proposed by D. Malah in 1979.
