= DJ mix =

Mix of recordings created by a DJ

A DJ mix, DJ mixset or DJ set is a sequence of musical tracks typically mixed together by a DJ to appear as one continuous track. DJ mixes are usually performed using a DJ mixer and multiple sounds sources, such as turntables, CD players, digital audio players or computer sound cards, sometimes with the addition of samplers and effects units, although it is possible to create one using sound editing software.

DJ mixing is significantly different from live sound mixing. Remix services were offered beginning in the late 1970s in order to provide music which was more easily beatmixed by DJs for the dancefloor. One of the earliest DJs to refine their mixing skills was DJ Kool Herc. Francis Grasso was the first DJ to use headphones and a basic form of mixing at the New York City nightclub Sanctuary. Upon its release in 2000, Paul Oakenfold's Perfecto Presents: Another World became the biggest-selling DJ mix album in the US.

== Music ==
A DJ mixes music from genres that fit into the more general term electronic dance music. Other genres mixed by DJ includes hip hop, breakbeat and disco. Four on the floor disco beats can be used to create seamless mixes so as to keep dancers locked to the dancefloor. Two main characteristics of music used in DJ mixes is a dominant bassline and repetitive beats. Music mixed by DJs usually has a tempo which ranges from 100 bpm up to 160 bpm.

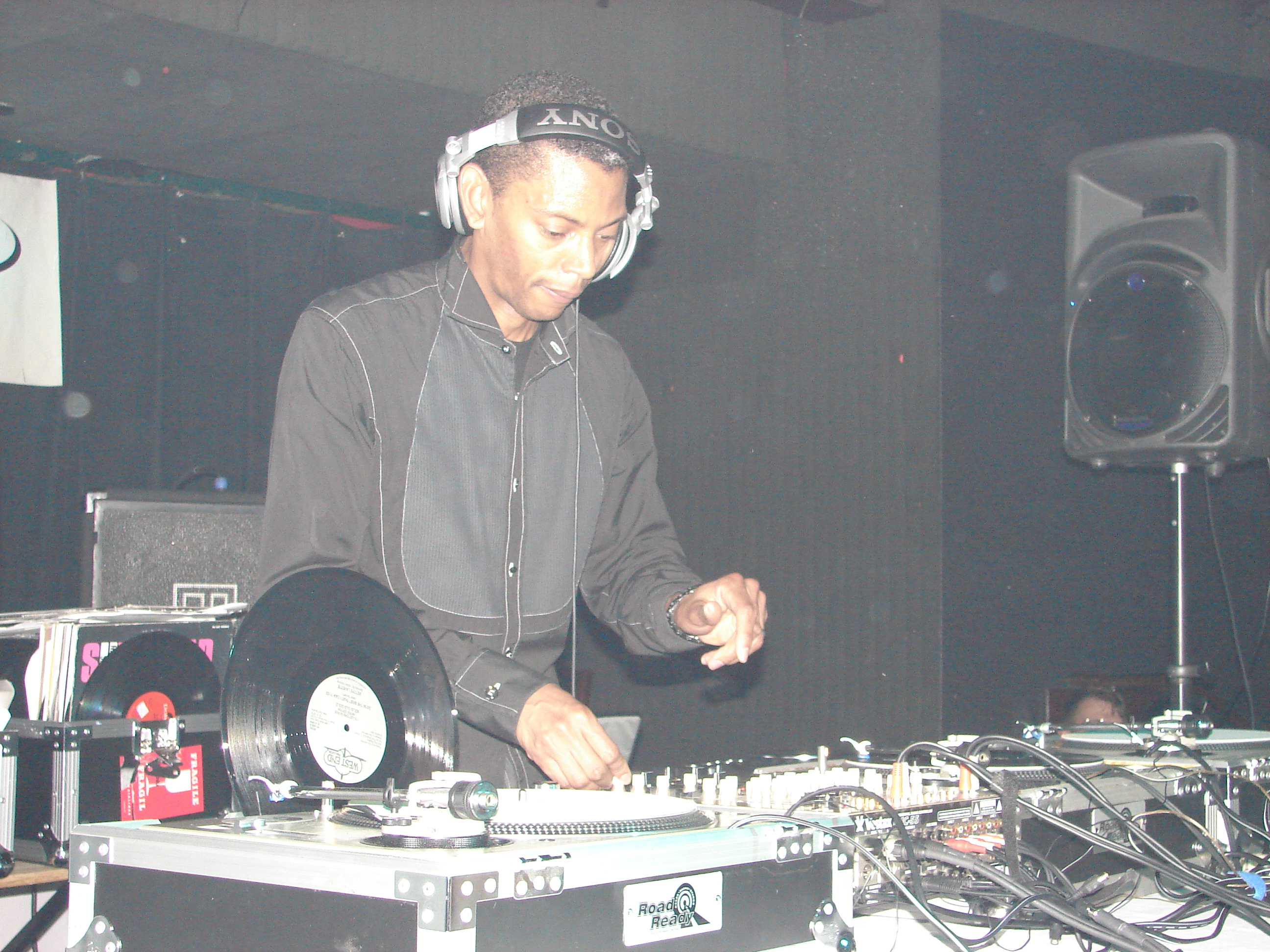
"The Wizard", techno DJ Jeff Mills in the mix.

== Technique ==
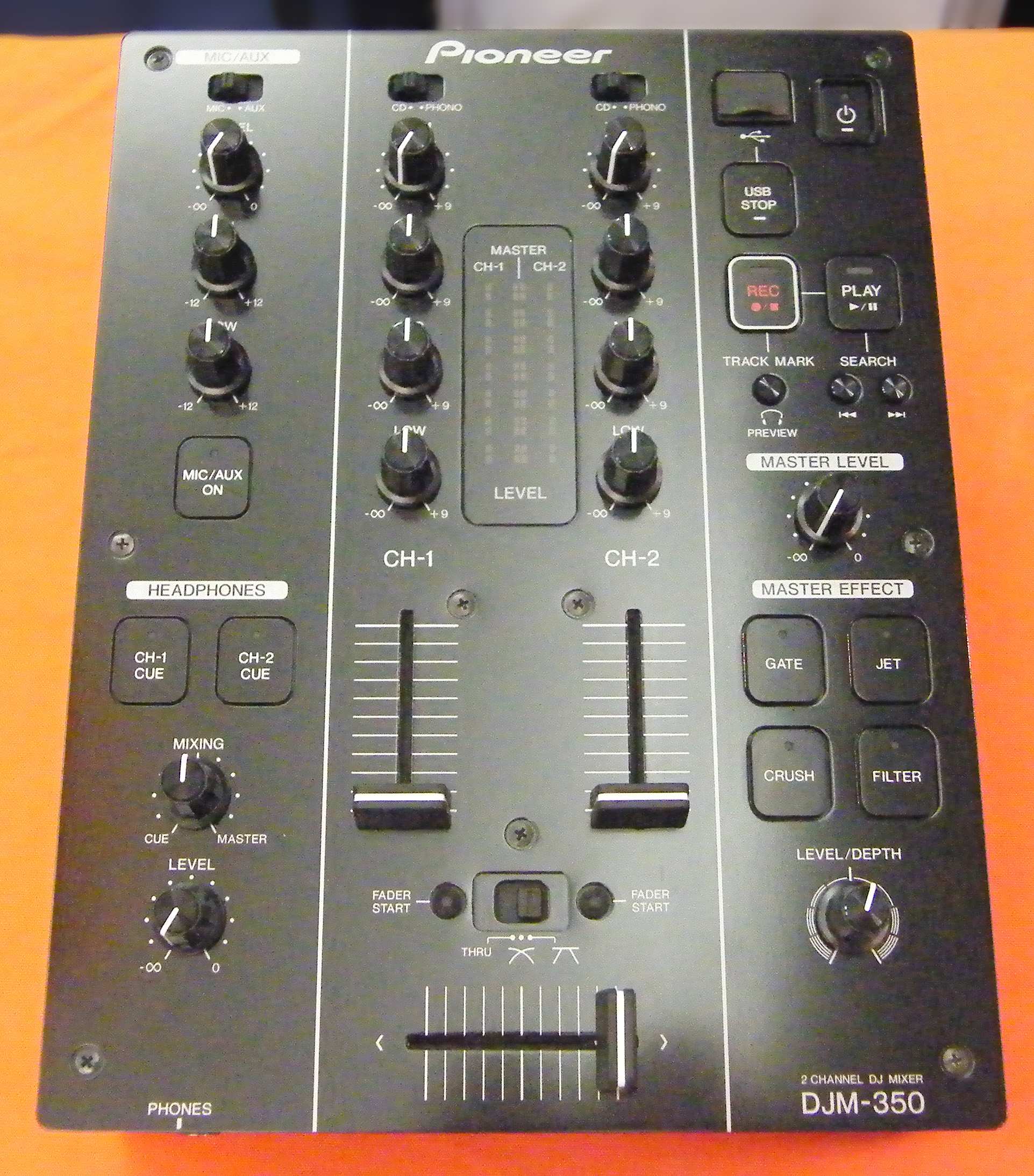
Pioneer DJM 350 mixer

A DJ mixset is usually performed live in front of an audience in a nightclub, party, or rave setting. Mixsets can also be performed live on radio or recorded in a studio. Methods of mixing vary slightly depending on the music genres being played. House and trance DJs tend to aim for smooth, blended mixes while hip-hop DJs may use turntablism, scratching and other cutting techniques. Some DJs, particularly those mixing Goa trance may prefer to mix during a break in which instead of beats, washes of synthesized sounds are combined. Further refinement to the mixing quality can be provided with harmonic mixing which avoids dissonant tones during a mix.

In live situations, the progression of the DJ set is a dynamic process. The DJ chooses tracks partly in response to the activity on the dance floor. If the dance floor becomes less active, the DJ will make a judgement as to what track will increase dance floor activity. This may involve shifting the tempo or changing the general mood of the set. Track choices are also due, in part, to where the DJ wishes to take their audience. In this way, the resulting mixset is brought about through a symbiotic relationship between audience and DJ. Studio DJs have the luxury of spending more time on their mix, which often leads to productions that could never be realized in real-time.

Traditional DJ mixing with vinyl required the DJ to sync the tempo of the tracks and modify each track's volume and equalisation to create a smooth blend. DJs can use a mixer's crossfader to switch between tracks or use the volume control for each source with the crossfader permanently positioned in the middle. Mixing is usually done through the use of headphones and a monitor speaker or foldback as basic aids. At this basic level, the DJ is required to develop a specific auditory skill where each track's tempo has to be distinguished while listening to more than one piece of music. The use of compact discs and players such as the CDJ brought technological advances for the DJ performing a mix including a readout of the bpm and a visual representation of the beat. Modern computer technology has allowed automatic beatmatching and led to debate regarding its use, which is sometimes described as cheating. DJ software provides automatic beatmatching and key detection which simplifies harmonic mixing.

== Legality ==
To be released commercially, DJ mixes often need many copyright clearances and licenses. The vast majority of DJ mixes throughout the years have only avoided legal action because the copyright holders generally do not choose to take legal action against the DJ for the unauthorized use of their material.

== Distribution ==
During the late 1990s and early 2000s, DJs would often distribute their recorded mixes on CD-Rs or as digital audio files via websites or podcasts for promotional purposes. Many popular DJs would release their mixes commercially on a compact disc. With declining CD usage, it has become more common for DJs to release their mix recordings through websites specifically set up for the purpose. Some of these sites, such as Mixcloud, and formerly Mixcrate, allowed for legal streaming of DJ mix recordings through established revenue deals with record publishing companies.

When DJ sets are distributed directly via the Internet, they are generally presented as a single unbroken audio file; cue sheets may be provided by the DJ or fans to allow the set to be burned to a CD, or listened to, as a series of separate tracks in the way it would be produced as a commercial mix.

== See also ==
- Medley (music)
- Segue
- Remix
