= Time-compressed speech =

Time-compressed speech refers to an audio recording of verbal text in which the text is presented in a much shorter time interval than it would through normally-paced real time speech. The basic purpose is to make recorded speech contain more words in a given time, while maintaining clarity. For example: a paragraph that might normally be expected to take 20 seconds to read, might instead be presented in 15 seconds, which would represent a time-compression of 25% (5 seconds out of 20).

The term "time-compressed speech" should not be confused with "speech compression", which controls the volume range of a sound, but does not alter its time envelope.

== Methods ==
While some voice talents are capable of speaking at rates significantly in excess of general norms, the term "time-compressed speech" most usually refers to examples in which the time-reduction has been accomplished through some form of electronic processing of the recorded speech.

In general, recorded speech can be electronically time-compressed by: increasing its speed (linear compression); removing silences (selective editing); a combination of the two (non-linear compression). The speed of a recording can be increased, which will cause the material to be presented at a faster rate (and hence in a shorter amount of time), but this has the undesirable side-effect of increasing the frequency of the whole passage, raising the pitch of the voices, which can reduce intelligibility.

There are normally silences between words and sentences, and even small silences within certain words, both of which can be reduced or removed ("edited-out") which will also reduce the amount of time occupied by the full speech recording. However, this can also have the effect of removing verbal "punctuation" from the speech, causing words and sentences to run together unnaturally, again reducing intelligibility.

Vowels are typically held a minimum of 20 milliseconds, over many cycles of the fundamental pitch. DSP systems can detect the beginning and end of each cycle and then skip over some fraction of those cycles, causing the material to be presented at a faster rate, without changing the pitch, maintaining a "normal" tone of voice.

The current preferred method of time-compression is called "non-linear compression", which employs a combination of selectively removing silences; speeding up the speech to make the reduced silences sound normally-proportioned to the text; and finally applying various data algorithms to bring the speech back down to the proper pitch. This produces a more acceptable result than either of the two earlier techniques; however, if unrestrained, removing the silences and increasing the speed can make a selection of speech sound more insistent, possibly to the point of unpleasantness.

== Applications ==
=== Advertising ===
Time-compressed speech is frequently used in television and radio advertising. The advantage of time-compressed speech is that the same number of words can be compressed into a smaller amount of time, reducing advertising costs, and/or allowing more information to be included in a given radio or TV advertisement. It is usually most noticeable in the information-dense caveats and disclaimers presented (usually by legal requirement) at the end of commercials—the aural equivalent of the "fine print" in a printed contract. This practice, however, is not new: before electronic methods were developed, spokespeople who could talk extremely quickly and still be understood were widely used as voice talents for radio and TV advertisements, especially for recording such disclaimers.

=== Education ===
Time-compressed speech has educational applications such as increasing the information density of trainings, and as a study aid. A number of studies have demonstrated that the average person is capable of relatively easily comprehending speech delivered at higher-than-normal rates, with the peak occurring at around 25% compression (that is, 25% faster than normal); this facility has been demonstrated in several languages. Conversational speech (in English) takes place at a rate of around 150 wpm (words per minute), but the average person is able to comprehend speech presented at rates of up to 200-250 wpm without undue difficulty. Blind and severely visually impaired subjects scored similar comprehension levels at even higher rates, up to 300-350 wpm. Blind people have been found to use time-compressed speech extensively, for example, when reviewing recorded lectures from high school and college classes, or professional trainings. Comprehension rates in older blind subjects have been found to be as good, or in some cases better than those found in younger sighted subjects.

Other studies have determined that the ability to comprehend highly time-compressed speech tends to fall off with increased age, and is also reduced when the language of the time-compressed speech is not the listener's native language. Non-native speakers can, however, improve their comprehension level of time-compressed speech with multi-day training.

=== Voice Mail ===
Voice mail systems have employed time-compressed speech since as far back as the 1970s. In this application, the technology enables the rapid review of messages in high-traffic systems, by a relatively small number of people.

=== Streaming Multimedia ===
Time-compressed speech has been explored as one of a variety of interrelated factors which may be manipulated to increase the efficiency of streaming multimedia presentations, by significantly reducing the latency times involved in the transfer of large digitally encoded media files.

== See also ==
- Audio timescale-pitch modification
- John Moschitta Jr., a spokesman capable of very fast speech
