= Harmonic mixing =

Type of DJ mix

Harmonic mixing or key mixing (also referred to as mixing in key) is a DJ technique of matching the musical key of tracks in a DJ mix to avoid dissonance and create harmonious mixes or mashups. Tracks may be matched if they are in the same key, if their keys are relative, or if their keys are in a subdominant or dominant relationship with one another.

The Camelot wheel is based on the circle of fifths and can be used for harmonic mixing.

Modern DJ software can use algorithms to determine a track's key. Other methods to determine key include the use of AI or looking up tracks in an online database.

Some DJ software and hardware can also pitch shift a track to change its key to one that is compatible with the currently playing track.

== See also ==
- Beatmatching
- Segue in music
