= List of musical works released in a stem format =

An example of WAV stem files sequenced inside of a folder, as exported with the digital audio workstation (DAW) Logic Pro.

The following is a list of musical works that have been released legally in a stem format for public use.

With the growing availability of amateur music-making software such as GarageBand, it has become possible for the general public to more easily make their own music. In 2005, as an experiment, Trent Reznor of Nine Inch Nails released the stems to the single "The Hand That Feeds". Since then, other artists have begun releasing the stems for some songs, the intention being that listeners can freely remix and reuse the music in any way desired.

== Albums ==
Title	Artist	Format
10,000 Gecs	100 Gecs	WAV
1000 Gecs	100 Gecs	WAV
1000 Gecs and the Tree of Clues	100 Gecs	WAV
Way to Normal	Ben Folds	GarageBand (AIFF)
Schlagenheim	Black Midi	WAV
Bon Iver, Bon Iver	Bon Iver	WAV
All Good No Worries	Boxout	Myxstem
How I'm Feeling Now	Charli XCX	WAV
Stretch Music	Christian Scott aTudne Adjuah	Myxstem
Tradition is a Temple	Darren Hoffman	Myxstem
Black Google	Death Grips	MP3
Flamboyant	Dorian Electra	WAV
Black Clouds & Silver Linings	Dream Theater	WAV
A Dramatic Turn Of Events	Dream Theater	CD
White Limousine	Duncan Sheik	WAV
In the Future	Failure	WAV
Shore	Fleet Foxes	WAV
The First Glass Beach Album	Glass Beach	WAV
Vol. 1	glbl wrmng & pell	Myxstem
Donda	Kanye West	Stem Player
Donda 2	Kanye West	Stem Player
Jesus Is King	Kanye West	Stem Player
Good Times	Kim Dotcom	FLAC; WAV
Sacrament	Lamb of God	WAV
Wrath	Lamb of God	MP3
Spirit Phone	Lemon Demon	FLAC
Nature Tapes	Lemon Demon	FLAC; MP3
I Am Become Christmas	Lemon Demon	FLAC MP3
Law of Attraction	Mike Casey	Myxstem
Innocents	Moby	WAV
Ghosts I–IV	Nine Inch Nails	WAV
The Slip	Nine Inch Nails	WAV
Year Zero	Nine Inch Nails	Ableton Live; GarageBand; WAV
NINJA 2009 Tour Sampler	Nine Inch Nails; Jane's Addiction; Street Sweeper Social Club	WAV
Wolfgang Amadeus Phoenix	Phoenix	WAV
Periphery IV: Hail Stan	Periphery	MP3
Periphery V: Djent Is Not a Genre	Periphery	MP3
April Fools	The Scary Jokes	WAV
Burn Pygmalion!!! a Better Guide to Romance	The Scary Jokes	WAV
Originals	Uncle Nef	Myxstem
Fishmonger	Underscores	WAV
Wallsocket	Underscores	WAV

== Songs ==
Title	Artist	Album	Format
"Bromance"	Avicii	n/a	MP3
"Flick of the Finger"	Beady Eye	BE	MP3
"End of Time"	Beyoncé	4	WAV
"A Secret Life"	Brian Eno & David Byrne	My Life in the Bush of Ghosts	MP3 WAV
"Help Me Somebody"	Brian Eno & David Byrne	My Life in the Bush of Ghosts	MP3 WAV
"Can You Feel My Heart"	Bring Me the Horizon	Sempiternal	MP3
"Your Body"	Christina Aguilera	Lotus	WAV
"Space Oddity"	David Bowie	Space Oddity	iTunes Plus
"Sofi Needs a Ladder"	deadmau5	4x4=12	WAV
"Nuthin' but a 'G' Thang"	Dr. Dre featuring Snoop Dogg	The Chronic	WAV
"Behind The Veil"	Dream Theater	Dream Theater	WAV
"On the Backs of Angels"	Dream Theater	A Dramatic Turn of Events	WAV
"America's Suitehearts"	Fall Out Boy	Folie à Deux	GarageBand
"Remember the Name"	Fort Minor	The Rising Tied	WAV
"Give A Little"	Hanson	Give A Little (Single)	WAV
"Love Lockdown"	Kanye West	808s & Heartbreak	MP3
"Wash Us in the Blood"	Kanye West	n/a	Stem Player
"Life of the Party (censored)	Kanye West & André 3000	Donda (deluxe)	Stem Player
"Up from the Ashes"	Kanye West	Donda (deluxe)	Stem Player
"Never Abandon Your Family"	Kanye West	Donda (deluxe)	Stem Player
"Remote Control pt 2"	Kanye West, Young Thug, Kid Cudi	Donda (deluxe)	Stem Player
"Eazy"	Kanye West & the Game	Donda 2 (Stem Player version) and Drillmatic – Heart vs. Mind	Stem Player
"Settle Down"	Kimbra	Vows	WAV
"Automation"	King Gizzard & The Lizard Wizard	K.G.	WAV
"All The Lovers"	Kylie Minogue	Aphrodite	WAV
"Breathe"	Kylie Minogue	Impossible Princess	WAV
"Brodyquest"	Lemon Demon	Nature Tapes	FLAC
"One Weird Tip"	Lemon Demon	One Weird Tip/Funkytown	MP3
"Funkytown"	Lemon Demon	One Weird Tip/Funkytown	MP3
"Sheezus"	Lily Allen	Sheezus	WAV
"The Catalyst"	Linkin Park	A Thousand Suns	WAV
"Odd Soul"	Mutemath	Odd Soul	WAV
"The Hand That Feeds"	Nine Inch Nails	With Teeth	Ableton Live; GarageBand; WAV
"Only"	Nine Inch Nails	With Teeth	Ableton Live; GarageBand; WAV
"Brain Power"	NOMA	NOMA's First Album	Bandcamp
"If I Lose Myself"	OneRepublic	Native	WAV
"Deathmetal Live"	Panchiko	D>E>A>T>H>M>E>T>A>L>S	WAV
"Power"	Patrick Alavi	Power	iTunes
"Nude"	Radiohead	In Rainbows	iTunes Plus
"Reckoner"	Radiohead	In Rainbows	iTunes Plus
"It Happened Today"	R.E.M.	Collapse into Now	AIFF; GarageBand; FLAC
"Banged and Blown Through"	Saul Williams	The Inevitable Rise and Liberation of NiggyTardust!	WAV
"Break"	Saul Williams	The Inevitable Rise and Liberation of NiggyTardust!	WAV
"Fight! Smash! Win!"	Street Sweeper Social Club	Street Sweeper Social Club	WAV
"Cradles"	Sub Urban	n/a	WAV
"Trustfall!"	Underscores	Six Impala Singles Collection	WAV
