= Promenade (Street Sweeper Social Club song) =

Single by Street Sweeper Social Club

from the album Street Sweeper Social Club
- Released: April 16, 2010
- Genre: Funk rock; rap rock; alternative rock; hard rock; dance-punk
- Length: 3:40
- Label: Street Sweeper Social Club
- Songwriters: Tom Morello; Boots Riley
- Producer: Tom Morello

Street Sweeper Social Club singles chronology
"100 Little Curses" (2010)	"Promenade" (2010)	"Paper Planes" (2010)

"Promenade" is the second single by rap rock supergroup Street Sweeper Social Club from their debut self-titled album. The version that was released as a single differs from that on the album, the original version on the album is 2:31 in length whereas the extended version is 3:40 in length. The extended version features a guitar solo by Tom Morello, the extended version is also on The Ghetto Blaster EP, but is listed as the 'Guitar Fury remix'.

Morello said that the song felt naked without the solo and so went back into the studio to remix it, Morello added that the single was released because of the positive reaction the song received at their live shows, as well as being a favorite of both Boots and Tom. Boots wanted the song to be "an evil disco square-dance rap".

== Guitar ==
The song is regular part of the band's set in their performances, Morello also adds an introduction to the single in their live performances using the Ibanez Talman (Custom) which is very similar to the introduction used in the Rage Against the Machine's song "Revolver". Morello has also played part of the guitar solo with his teeth in live performances. The song is played in standard E-A-D-G-B-e and by alternating between the verse and the chorus. The chorus itself is played in octaves on the guitar, whereas the verse is described as "an evil disco square-dance rap".

The first solo in the song, which is described as "some blues style riffing on the E pentatonic scale" by guitarist Tom Morello in the instructional video as to how to play the 'Guitar Fury remix' of "Promenade", from ultimate-guitar.tv, and is played with a Dunlop Cry Baby Wah-Wah pedal and an Equalizer pedal that is set flat across for boost, in that so that the volume could go to 11. The song is ended with the famous "grand and wild eye" guitar solo, where he incorporates the use of his Digitech Whammy WH-1, and again, with his Dunlop Cry Baby Wah-Wah pedal, a Delay pedal, and the Equalizer pedal.
