= Jimmy Savile =

English media personality and sex offender (1926–2011)

Sir Jimmy Savile OBE KCSG
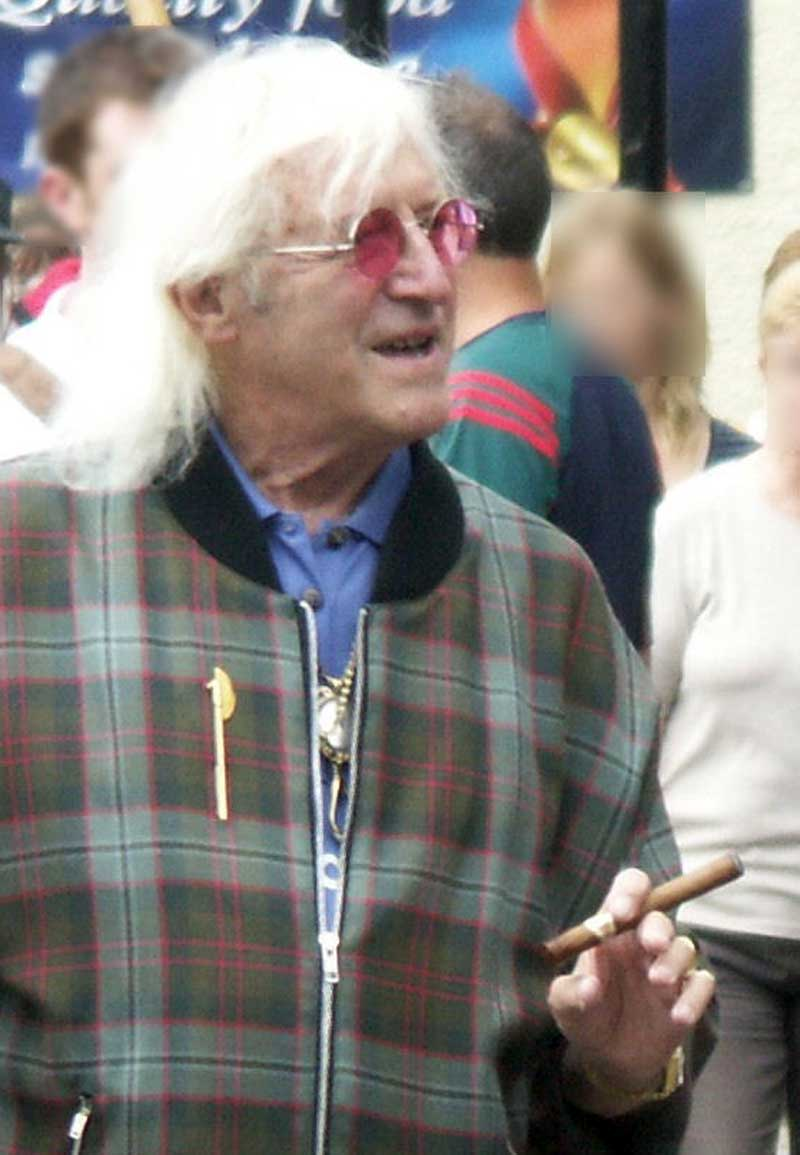
- Savile in 2006
- Born: James Wilson Vincent Savile; 31 October 1926; Burley, Leeds, England
- Died: 29 October 2011 (aged 84); Leeds, England
- Occupations: Media personality; DJ
- Years active: 1958–2011
- Victims: Hundreds sexually abused

Signature
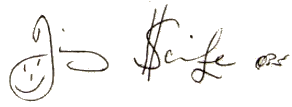

Sir James Wilson Vincent Savile (/ˈsævɪl/; 31 October 1926 – 29 October 2011) was an English media personality and disc jockey. During his lifetime, he was known for his eccentric image, charitable work, and hosting the BBC shows Top of the Pops and Jim'll Fix It. Following his death, hundreds of allegations of sexual abuse made against him were investigated, leading the police to conclude that he had been a predatory sex offender, possibly one of the United Kingdom's most prolific. Allegations of sexual abuse were made during his lifetime, but they were dismissed and accusers were ignored or disbelieved. Savile's victims allegedly included young children and elderly individuals.

As a teenager during the Second World War, Savile worked in coal mines as a Bevin Boy. He began a career playing records in, and later managing, dance halls. His media career started as a disc jockey at Radio Luxembourg in 1958 and at Tyne Tees Television in 1960. From 1964 to 1988, Savile was a regular presenter on the BBC music show Top of the Pops, also co-presenting the last edition in 2006. In 1968, he began hosting his own radio shows for Radio 1, broadcasting until 1987. From 1975 to 1994, he presented Jim'll Fix It, an early Saturday evening television programme which arranged for the wishes of viewers, mainly children, to come true.

Savile was known for fundraising and supporting various charities and hospitals, in particular Stoke Mandeville Hospital in Aylesbury, Leeds General Infirmary, and Broadmoor Hospital in Berkshire. In 2009, he was described by The Guardian as a "prodigious philanthropist" and was honoured for his charity work. He was awarded the OBE in 1971 and was knighted in 1990. Following his death in 2011 at the age of 84, Savile was praised in obituaries for his personal qualities and his work raising an estimated £40 million for charities.

In October 2012, an ITV documentary examined claims of sexual abuse by Savile. This led to extensive media coverage and a substantial and rapidly growing body of witness statements and sexual abuse claims, including accusations against public bodies for covering up or failure of duty. Scotland Yard launched a criminal investigation into allegations of child sex abuse by Savile spanning six decades, describing him as a "predatory sex offender", and later stated that they were pursuing more than 400 lines of inquiry based on the testimony of 300 potential victims received via 14 police forces. The scandal resulted in inquiries or reviews at the BBC, the NHS, the Crown Prosecution Service, and the Department of Health. In June 2014, investigations into Savile's activities at 28 NHS hospitals concluded that he had sexually assaulted staff and patients aged between 5 and 75 over several decades. As a result of the scandal, some of the honours that Savile was awarded during his life were posthumously revoked, and his television appearances are no longer shown.

== Early life and work ==
Savile, born in Consort Terrace, in the Burley area of Leeds in the West Riding of Yorkshire, was the youngest of seven children (his elder siblings were Mary, Marjory, Vincent, John, Joan, and Christina) in a Roman Catholic family. His parents were Vincent Joseph Savile (1886–1953), a bookmaker's clerk and insurance agent, and his wife, Agnes Monica Kelly (1886–1972). His paternal grandmother was Scottish, whilst his mother was of Irish descent. Savile grew up during the Great Depression, and later claimed that he "was forged in the crucible of want." He described his father as "scrupulously honest but scrupulously broke."

Savile's mother believed he owed his life to the intercession of Margaret Sinclair, a Scottish nun, after he recovered quickly from illness, possibly pneumonia, at the age of two when his mother prayed at Leeds Cathedral after picking up a pamphlet about Sinclair. Savile went to St Anne's Roman Catholic School in Leeds. After leaving school at the age of 14 he worked in an office. At the age of 18, during the Second World War he was conscripted to work as a Bevin Boy and worked in coal mines, where he reportedly suffered spinal injuries from a shot-firer's explosion; he spent a long period recuperating, wearing a steel corset and for three years walking with the aid of sticks. Following his colliery work, Savile became a scrap metal dealer. Savile also started playing records in dance halls in the early 1940s, and falsely claimed to be the first DJ – in his autobiography, he professed to have been the first to use two turntables and a microphone at the Grand Records Ball at the Guardbridge Hotel in 1947, although his claim to have been the first was untrue: twin turntables were illustrated in the BBC Handbook in 1929 and advertised for sale in Gramophone magazine in 1931. It was also around this time that he became a semi-professional sportsman, competing in the 1951 Tour of Britain cycle race and also working as a professional wrestler.

Savile lived in Salford from the mid-1950s to the mid-1960s, the later period with Ray Teret, who became his support DJ, assistant, and chauffeur. Savile managed the Plaza Ballroom on Oxford Street, in Manchester city centre, in the mid-1950s. When he lived in Great Clowes Street in Higher Broughton, Salford, he was often seen sitting on his front door steps. He managed the Mecca Locarno ballroom in Leeds in the late 1950s and early 1960s as well as the Mecca-owned Palais dance hall in Ilford, Essex, between 1955 and 1956. His Monday evening records-only dance sessions (admission one shilling) were popular with local teens. It was while at Ilford that Savile was discovered by a music executive from Decca Records.

== Career ==
=== Radio ===
Savile's radio career began as a DJ at Radio Luxembourg from 1958 to 1968. By 1968 he presented six programmes a week, and his Saturday show reached six million listeners. In terms of recognition, he was one of the leading DJs in Britain by the early 1960s. In 1968, he joined Radio 1, where he presented Savile's Travels, a weekly programme broadcast on Sundays in which he travelled around the UK talking to members of the public. From 1969 to 1973 he fronted Speakeasy, a discussion programme for teenagers. On Radio 1 he presented the Sunday lunchtime show Jimmy Savile's Old Record Club, playing chart Top 10s from years gone by. It was the first show to feature old charts and Savile used a "points system" in an imaginary quiz with the audience to guess the names of the song and artist. It began in 1973 as The Double Top Ten Show, and ended in 1987 as The Triple Top Ten Show when he left Radio 1 after 19 years. He presented The Vintage Chart Show, playing top tens from 1957 to 1987, on the BBC World Service from March 1987 until October 1989.

From March 1989 to August 1997, he broadcast on various stations around the UK (mostly taking the Gold format, such as the West Midlands' Xtra AM and the Classic Gold network in Yorkshire) where he revived his Radio 1 shows. In 1994, satirist Chris Morris gave a fake obituary on BBC Radio 1 saying that Savile had collapsed and died, which allegedly drew threats of legal action from Savile and forced an apology from Morris. On 25 December 2005 and 1 January 2007, he presented shows on the Real Radio network. The Christmas 2005 show counted down the festive Top 10s of 10, 20, and 30 years previously, while the New Year 2007 show (also taken by Century Radio following its acquisition by GMG) featured Savile recounting anecdotes from his past and playing associated records, mostly from the 1960s and some from the 1970s.

=== Television ===
Savile's first television role was as a co-presenter, with Valerie Masters, of Tyne Tees Television's music programme Young at Heart, which aired for eight weeks from May 1960. Although the show was broadcast in black and white, Savile dyed his hair a different colour every week as part of a long-running joke. On New Year's Day 1964, he presented the first edition of the BBC music chart television programme Top of the Pops from Dickenson Road Studios, a television studio in a converted church in Rusholme, Manchester. On 30 July 2006, he co-hosted the final weekly edition, ending it with the words "It's number one, it's still Top of the Pops", before turning off the studio lights after the closing credits. When interviewed by the BBC on 20 November 2008 and asked about the revival of Top of the Pops for a Christmas comeback, he said he would welcome a "cameo role" in the programme.

In the early 1960s, Savile co-hosted (with Pete Murray) the televised New Musical Express Poll Winners' Concert, held annually at the Empire Pool in Wembley, with acts such as the Beatles, Cliff Richard and the Shadows, Joe Brown and the Bruvvers, the Who, and many others. On 31 December 1969, he hosted the BBC/ZDF co-production Pop Go the Sixties, shown across Western Europe, celebrating the hits of the decade.

Savile presented a series of public information films promoting road safety, notably "Clunk Click Every Trip", which promoted the use of seatbelts, the clunk representing the sound of the door and the click the sound of the seatbelt fastening. It led to Savile's Saturday-night chat/variety show from 1973 on BBC One titled Clunk, Click, which in 1974 featured the UK heats of the Eurovision Song Contest featuring Olivia Newton-John. After two series, Clunk, Click was replaced by Jim'll Fix It, which he presented from 1975 to 1994. Savile won an award from Mary Whitehouse's National Viewers' and Listeners' Association in 1977 for his "wholesome family entertainment". He fronted a long-running series of advertisements in the early 1980s for British Rail's InterCity 125, in which he declared "This is the age of the train." Savile was twice the subject of the Thames Television series This Is Your Life in January 1970 with Eamonn Andrews and again in December 1990 with Michael Aspel.

In an interview by Anthony Clare for the radio series In the Psychiatrist's Chair in 1991, Savile appeared to be "a man without feelings." "There is something chilling about this 20th-century 'saint'", Clare concluded in 1992 in his introduction to the published transcript of this interview. Andrew Neil interviewed him for the TV series Is This Your Life? in 1995 where Savile "used a banana to avoid discussing his personal life". In 1999, he appeared as a panellist on Have I Got News for You.

In April 2000, he was the subject of a documentary by Louis Theroux, in the When Louis Met... series, in which Theroux accompanied British celebrities going about their daily business and interviewed them about their lives and experiences. In the documentary, Savile confided that he used to beat people up and lock them in a basement during his career as a nightclub manager. When Theroux challenged Savile about rumours of paedophilia over a decade before, Savile said: "We live in a very funny world. And it's easier for me, as a single man, to say 'I don't like children', because that puts a lot of salacious tabloid people off the hunt."

Savile visited the Celebrity Big Brother house on 14 and 15 January 2006 (in series 4) and "fixed it" for some housemates to have their wishes granted; Pete Burns received a message from his boyfriend, Michael, and Lynn, his ex-wife, while Dennis Rodman traded Savile's offering for a supply of cigarettes for the other housemates. In 2007, Savile returned to television with Jim'll Fix It Strikes Again showing some of the most popular fix-its, recreating them with the same people, and making new dreams come true.

== Charity work ==
Savile is estimated to have raised £40 million for charity. One cause for which he raised money was Stoke Mandeville Hospital, where he volunteered for many years as a porter. He raised money for the Spinal Unit, NSIC (National Spinal Injuries Centre), and St Francis Ward – a ward for children and teens with spinal cord injuries, as well as Ireland's Central Remedial Clinic. Savile also volunteered at Leeds General Infirmary and Broadmoor Hospital. In August 1988, he was appointed by junior health minister Edwina Currie chair of an interim task force overseeing the management of Broadmoor Hospital, after its board members had been suspended. Savile had his own rooms at Stoke Mandeville and Broadmoor. In 1989, Savile started legal proceedings against News Group Newspapers after the News of the World published an article in January 1988 suggesting he had been in a position to secure the release of patients from Broadmoor who were considered "dangerous". Savile won on 11 July 1989; News Group paid his legal costs, and he received an apology from editors Kelvin MacKenzie and Patsy Chapman. In 2012, it was reported that Savile had sexually abused vulnerable patients at the hospitals.

From 1974 to 1988, Savile was the honorary president of Phab (Physically Handicapped in the Able Bodied community). He sponsored medical students performing undergraduate research in the Leeds University Research Enterprise scholarship scheme, donating more than £60,000 every year. In 2010, the scheme was given a commitment of £500,000 over the following five years. Following Savile's death in October 2011, it was confirmed that a bequest had been made to allow continued support for the programme.

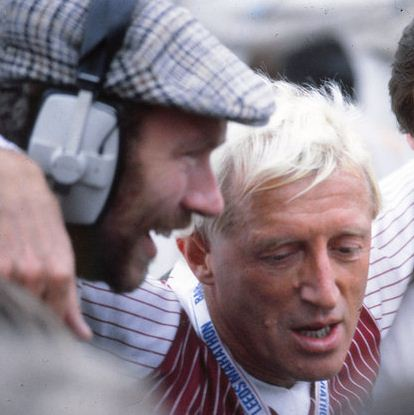
Savile at the 1982 Leeds Marathon

Savile was a participant in marathons (many for Phab, including its annual half marathon around Hyde Park, London). He also cycled from Land's End to John o' Groats in 10 days for the Royal National Lifeboat Institution, and ran in the Scottish People's Marathon. It was reported that he completed the London Marathon at the age of 79; rumours that he was driven round in a lead vehicle as an "observer" were denied by marathon officials.

Savile set up two charities, the Jimmy Savile Stoke Mandeville Hospital Trust in 1981, and the Leeds-based Jimmy Savile Charitable Trust in 1984. During the sexual abuse scandal in October 2012 the charities announced that they would distribute their funds, of £1.7 million and £3.7 million respectively, among other charities and then close down. He also raised money for several Jewish charities.

== Public image ==
During his lifetime and at the time of his death, Savile was regarded as "an eccentric adornment to British public life ... a ubiquitous and distinctive face on television", who "relished being in the public eye" and was "a shrewd promoter of his own image." He created a "bizarre yodel", and catchphrases which included "How's about that, then?", "Now then, now then", "Goodness gracious", "As it 'appens", and "Guys and gals". Savile was frequently spoofed for his dress sense, which usually featured a tracksuit or shellsuit and gold jewellery. A range of licensed fancy dress costumes was released with his consent in 2009. Savile was often pictured holding a cigar. He claimed to have started smoking cigars at the age of seven, saying "My dad gave me a drag on one at Christmas, thinking it would put me off them forever, but it had the opposite effect."

Savile was a member of Mensa and the Institute of Advanced Motorists; he drove a Rolls-Royce. He was made a life member of the British Gypsy Council in 1975, becoming the first "outsider" to be made a member. In 1984, Savile became a member of the Athenaeum, a gentlemen's club in London's Pall Mall. He was chieftain of the Lochaber Highland Games for many years, and owned a house in Glen Coe; his appearance on the final edition of Top of the Pops in 2006 was pre-recorded because it clashed with the games.

Through his support of charities, Savile became a friend of Margaret Thatcher, who in 1981 described his work as "marvellous". It has been reported that Savile spent 11 consecutive New Year's Eves at Chequers with Thatcher and her family, although this is disputed by Thatcher's daughter, Carol, and by Lord Bell, a close friend of the Thatcher family, who said "people make up such rubbish." Letters released in December 2012 by the National Archives under the thirty-year rule confirm the "close friendship" between Savile and Thatcher. Some of the correspondence was heavily redacted before publication, using exemptions under the Freedom of Information Act.

Savile met Prince Charles through mutual charity interests. His work with Stoke Mandeville Hospital also made Savile a suitable figure to whom the Prince could turn "for advice on navigating Britain's health authorities". Charles met Savile on several occasions. In 1999, Charles visited Savile's Glen Coe home for a private meal and reportedly sent him gifts on his 80th birthday and a note reading: "Nobody will ever know what you have done for this country, Jimmy. This is to go some way in thanking you for that." Savile was also in contact with other members of the royal household and received telegrams from Diana, Princess of Wales, and Prince Philip, Duke of Edinburgh, as well as a handwritten letter from Princess Alexandra's husband Sir Angus Ogilvy and a homemade card from Sarah, Duchess of York. Savile acted as an unofficial adviser to Prince Charles, who sought his advice on a number of occasions on how the royal family ought to interact with the public and media. In 1989, Savile hand-wrote an unofficial set of guidelines to Charles on how members of the royal family and staff may respond to disasters. Charles showed the dossier to his father, Prince Philip, who passed the contents on to Queen Elizabeth II.

A lifelong bachelor, Savile lived with his mother (whom he referred to as the "Duchess") and kept her bedroom and wardrobe exactly as it was when she died. Every year he had her clothes dry cleaned. In his autobiography, he claimed he had had many sexual relations with women, and that "there have been trains and, with apologies to the hit parade, boats and planes (I am a member of the 40,000 ft club) and bushes and fields, corridors, doorways, floors, chairs, slag heaps, desks, and probably everything except the celebrated chandelier and ironing board."

== Health and death ==
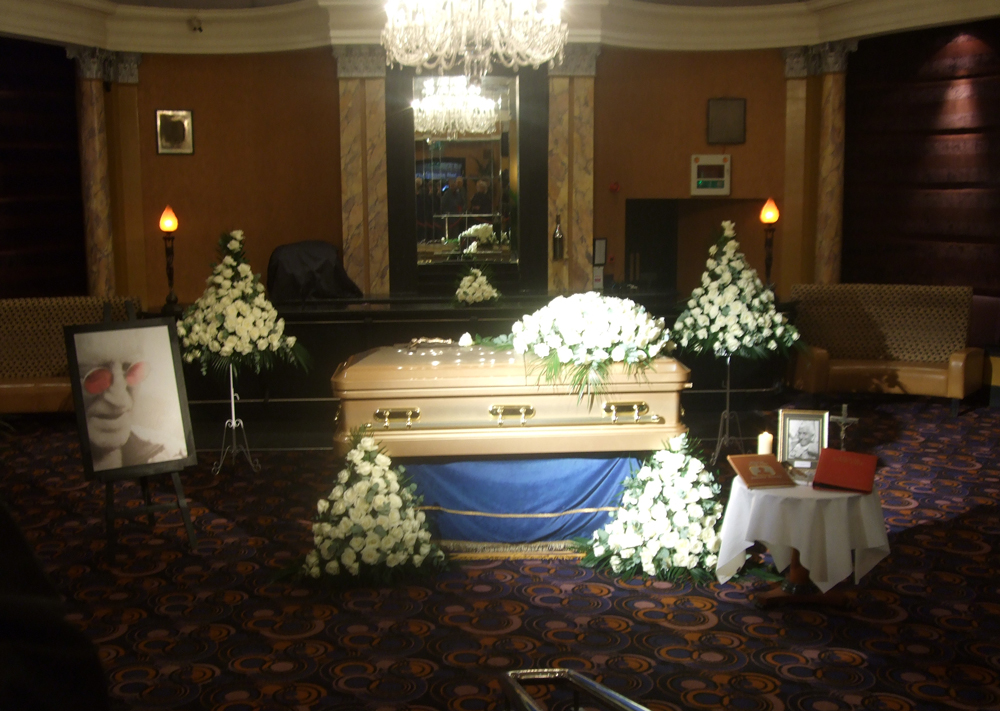
Savile's coffin on display at the Queens Hotel in Leeds, 8 November 2011

On 9 August 1997, Savile underwent a three-hour quadruple heart-bypass operation at Killingbeck Hospital in Killingbeck, Leeds, having known he needed the surgery for at least four years after attending regular check-ups. He arranged for a bench in Scarborough, North Yorkshire, to be dedicated to his memory, with a plaque saying "Sir Jimmy Savile – but not just yet".

On 29 October 2011, Savile was found dead at his penthouse flat overlooking Roundhay Park in Leeds, at the age of 84. He had been in hospital with pneumonia, and his death was not suspicious. His nephew, Roger Foster, said he "passed away quietly in his sleep during the night".

His closed satin gold coffin was displayed at the Queens Hotel in Leeds, with the last cigar he smoked and his two This Is Your Life books. Around 4,000 people visited to pay tribute. His funeral took place at the Roman Catholic Leeds Cathedral on 9 November 2011, and he was buried at Woodlands Cemetery in Scarborough. As specified in his will, his coffin was inclined at 45 degrees to fulfil his wish to "see the sea". The coffin was encased in concrete "as a security measure".

An auction of Savile's possessions was conducted at the Royal Armouries Museum, Leeds, on 30 July 2012, with the proceeds going to charity. His silver Rolls-Royce Corniche convertible was sold for £130,000 to an Internet bidder. The vehicle's number plate, JS 247, featured the original medium wave wavelength used by BBC Radio 1 (247 metres).

== Sexual abuse by Savile ==
Savile often came into contact with his victims through his creative projects for the BBC and his charitable work for the NHS. A significant part of his career and public life involved working with children and young people, including visiting schools and hospital wards. He spent 20 years from 1964 presenting Top of the Pops, aimed at a teenage audience, and an overlapping 20 years presenting Jim'll Fix It, in which he helped the wishes of viewers, mainly children, come true.

=== Allegations during his lifetime ===
During his lifetime, two police investigations considered reports about Savile, the earliest known being from 1958, but none had led to charges; the investigations had each concluded that there was insufficient evidence for any charges to be brought related to sexual offences. Sporadic allegations of child abuse were made against him dating back to 1963, but these only became widely publicised after his death. His autobiography As it Happens (1974; reprinted as Love is an Uphill Thing, 1976) contains admissions of improper sexual conduct which appear to have passed unnoticed during his lifetime.

Former Sex Pistols and Public Image Ltd vocalist John Lydon, in an October 1978 interview recorded for BBC Radio 1, alluded to sordid conduct committed by Savile, as well as suppression of widely-held knowledge about such activity. Lydon stated: "I'd like to kill Jimmy Savile; I think he's a hypocrite. I bet he's into all kinds of seediness that we all know about, but are not allowed to talk about. I know some rumours." He added: "I bet none of this will be allowed out." As predicted, the comment was edited out by the BBC prior to broadcasting, but the complete interview was included as a bonus track on a re-release of Public Image Ltd's 1978 debut album Public Image: First Issue in 2013, after Savile's death. In October 2014, Lydon expanded on his original quote, saying: "By killed I meant locking him up and stopping him assaulting young children... I'm disgusted at the media pretending they weren't aware." In 1987, Scottish stand-up comedian Jerry Sadowitz recorded a performance in Edinburgh in which he stated that Savile was a paedophile. The album, Gobshite, was withdrawn amid fears of legal action.

In a 1990 interview for The Independent on Sunday, Lynn Barber asked Savile about rumours that he liked "little girls." Savile's reply was that, as he worked in the pop music business, "the young girls in question don't gather round me because of me – it's because I know the people they love, the stars... I am of no interest to them." In April 2000, in a documentary by Louis Theroux, When Louis Met ... Jimmy, Savile acknowledged "salacious tabloid people" had raised rumours about whether he was a paedophile, and said, "I know I'm not." A follow-up documentary, Louis Theroux: Savile, about Savile – and Theroux's failure to enquire more thoroughly into the allegations during the 2000 documentary – aired on BBC Two in 2016.

In 2007, Savile was interviewed under caution by police investigating an allegation of indecent assault in the 1970s at the now-closed Duncroft Approved School for Girls near Staines, Surrey, where he was a regular visitor. By October 2009, the Crown Prosecution Service had determined that there was insufficient evidence to take any further action and no charges were brought; this decision was later reviewed, and the DPP apologised for its handling of the charging decision. In March 2008, Savile started legal proceedings against The Sun, which had linked him in several articles to child abuse at the Jersey children's home Haut de la Garenne. At first, he denied visiting Haut de la Garenne, but later – following the publication of a photograph showing him at the home surrounded by children – admitted he had done so. The States of Jersey Police said that in 2008 an allegation of an indecent assault by Savile at the home in the 1970s had been investigated, but there had been insufficient evidence to proceed.

In a 2009 interview with his biographer, Savile defended viewers of child pornography, including pop star and convicted sex offender Gary Glitter. He argued that viewers "didn't do anything wrong but they are then demonised", and described Glitter as a celebrity being unfairly vilified for watching "dodgy films" in the privacy of his home: "Gary ... has not tried to sell 'em, not tried to show them in public or anything like that. It were for his own gratification. Whether it was right or wrong is, of course, it's up to him as a person." The interview was not published at the time, and the recording was not released until after Savile's death.

In 2012, Sir Roger Jones, a former BBC governor for Wales and chairman of BBC charity Children in Need, disclosed that more than a decade before Savile's death he had banned the "very strange" and "creepy" Savile from involvement in the charity. Former royal family press secretary Dickie Arbiter said Savile's behaviour had raised "concern and suspicion" when Savile acted as an informal marriage counsellor between Prince Charles and his wife Diana in the late 1980s, although no reports had been made. Arbiter added that during his regular visits to Charles's office at St James's Palace, Savile would "do the rounds of the young ladies taking their hands and rubbing his lips all the way up their arms."

=== After his death ===
Immediately after Savile's death, the BBC's Newsnight programme began an investigation into reports that he was a sexual abuser. Meirion Jones and Liz MacKean interviewed one alleged victim on camera and others agreed to have their stories told. The interviewees alleged abuse at Duncroft Approved School for Girls in Staines, Stoke Mandeville Hospital, and the BBC. Newsnight also discovered that Surrey Police had investigated allegations of abuse against Savile. The item was scheduled for broadcast in Newsnight on 7 December 2011, but it was withdrawn before broadcast; over Christmas 2011, the BBC broadcast two tributes to Savile.

In December 2012, a review led by Nick Pollard of the BBC's handling of the issue described the decision not to broadcast the Newsnight investigation as "flawed." The review said that Jones and MacKean had found "cogent evidence" that Savile was an abuser. George Entwistle – at that time the Director of BBC Vision – who had been told about the plan to broadcast the Newsnight item, was described by the review as "unnecessarily cautious, and an opportunity was lost." There was no public mention of the Newsnight investigation into Savile in December 2011 but in early 2012 several newspapers reported that the BBC had investigated but not broadcast its report of allegations of sexual abuse immediately after his death. An article by Miles Goslett in The Oldie said that a BBC News source had told him that the BBC's "smokescreen" that the story was dropped only for editorial reasons concealed other reasons showing the BBC itself – on whose premises abuse took place – in a bad light.

On 28 September 2012, almost a year after his death, ITV said it would broadcast a documentary as part of its Exposure series, The Other Side of Jimmy Savile. The documentary, presented by Mark Williams-Thomas, a consultant on the original Newsnight investigation, revealed claims by up to 10 women, including one aged under 14 at the time, that they had been molested or raped by Savile during the 1960s and 1970s. The announcement attracted national attention, and more reports and claims of abuse against him accumulated. The documentary was broadcast on 3 October. The next day, the Metropolitan Police said the Child Abuse Investigation Command would assess the allegations.

The developing scandal led to inquiries into practices at the BBC and the National Health Service. It was alleged that rumours of Savile's activities had circulated at the BBC in the 1960s and 1970s, but no action had been taken. The Director-General of the BBC, George Entwistle, apologised for what had happened, and on 16 October 2012 appointed former High Court judge Dame Janet Smith to review the culture and practices of the BBC during the time Savile worked there; and Nick Pollard, a former Sky News executive, was appointed to look at why the Newsnight investigation into Savile's activities was dropped shortly before transmission in December 2011.

By 19 October 2012, police were pursuing 400 lines of inquiry based on testimony from 200 witnesses via 14 police forces across the UK. They described the alleged abuse as "on an unprecedented scale", and the number of potential victims as "staggering." Investigations codenamed Operation Yewtree were opened to identify criminal conduct related to Savile's activities by the Metropolitan Police, and to review the 2009 decision by the Crown Prosecution Service to drop a prosecution as "unlikely to succeed." By 25 October, police reported the number of possible victims was approaching 300.

On 22 October 2012, the BBC programme Panorama broadcast an investigation into Newsnight and found evidence suggesting "senior manager" pressure; on the same day, Newsnight editor Peter Rippon "stepped down" with immediate effect. The Department of Health appointed former barrister Kate Lampard to chair and oversee its investigations into Savile's activities at Stoke Mandeville Hospital, Leeds General Infirmary, Broadmoor Hospital, and other hospitals and facilities in England.

On 12 November 2012, the Metropolitan Police announced the scale of sexual allegations reported against Savile was "unprecedented" in Britain: a total of 450 alleged victims had contacted the police in the ten weeks since the investigation was launched. Officers recorded 199 crimes in 17 police force areas in which Savile was a suspect, among them 31 allegations of rape in seven force areas. Analysis of the report showed 82% of those who came forward to report abuse were female and 80% were children or young people at the time of the incidents. According to one former Broadmoor nurse, Savile said he engaged in necrophiliac acts with corpses in the Leeds General Infirmary mortuary. Savile was said to be friends with the chief mortician, who gave him near-unrestricted access.

Exposure Update: The Jimmy Savile Investigation was shown on ITV on 21 November 2012. In March 2013, Her Majesty's Inspectorate of Constabulary reported that 214 of the complaints that had been made against Savile after his death would have been criminal offences if they had been reported at the time. Sixteen victims reported being raped by Savile when they were under 16 (the age of consent in England) and four of those had been under the age of 10. Thirteen others reported serious sexual assaults by Savile, including four who had been under 10 years old. Another 10 victims reported being raped by Savile after the age of 16.

In January 2013, a joint report by the NSPCC and Metropolitan Police, Giving Victims a Voice, stated that 450 people had made complaints against Savile, the period of alleged abuse stretching from 1955 to 2009 and the ages of the complainants at the times of the assaults ranging from 8 to 47. The suspected victims included 28 children aged under 10, including 10 boys aged eight. A further 63 were girls aged between 13 and 16, and nearly three-quarters of his alleged victims were under 18. Some 214 criminal offences were recorded, 34 rapes having been reported across 28 police forces.

Former professional wrestler Adrian Street described in a November 2013 interview how "Savile used to go on and on about the young girls who'd wait in line for him outside his dressing room ... He'd pick the ones he wanted and say to the rest, 'Unlucky, come back again tomorrow night'." Savile, who cultivated a "tough guy" image promoted by his entourage, was hit with real blows during a 1971 bout with Street, who commented that had he "known then the full extent of what I know about [Savile] now, I'd have given him an even bigger hiding – were that physically possible."

During the Independent Inquiry into Child Sexual Abuse in March 2019, it was reported that Robert Armstrong, the head of the Honours Committee, had resisted attempts by Margaret Thatcher to award Savile a knighthood in the 1980s due to concerns about his private life. An anonymous letter received by the committee in 1998 said that "reports of a paedophilia nature" could emerge about Savile. In 2022, former BBC presenter Mark Lawson wrote about his encounters with Savile, and hearing from many BBC personnel – not at the top level – about his abuse and rumoured necrophilia. Lawson ended:

the true story is his victims, and how the BBC, Department of Health, Conservative party, Catholic church, police forces, local councils and libel law let them down. ... a monster for whom the British establishment – political, royal, broadcasting, ecclesiastical, medical, charitable – provided a dazzling shield.

=== Aftermath ===
An authorised biography, How's About That Then?, by Alison Bellamy, was published in June 2012. After the claims made against him were published, the author said that, in the light of the allegations, she felt "let down and betrayed" by Savile. Within a month of the child abuse scandal emerging, many places and organisations named after or connected to Savile were renamed or had his name removed. A memorial plaque on the wall of Savile's former home in Scarborough was removed in early October 2012 after it was defaced with graffiti. A wooden statue of Savile at Scotstoun Leisure Centre in Glasgow was also removed around the same time. Signs on a footpath in Scarborough named "Savile's View" were removed. Savile's Hall, the conference centre at the Royal Armouries Museum in Leeds, was renamed New Dock Hall. The Jimmy Savile Charitable Trust and the Jimmy Savile Stoke Mandeville Hospital Trust, two registered charities founded in his name to fight "poverty and sickness and other charitable purposes" announced they were too closely tied to his name to be sustainable and would close and distribute their funds to other charities, so as to avoid harm to beneficiaries from future media attention.

On 9 October 2012, relatives said the headstone of Savile's grave would be removed, destroyed, and sent to landfill. The Savile family expressed their sorrow for the "anguish" of the victims and "respect [for] public opinion." Savile's body remains interred in the cemetery in Scarborough, as although it was proposed that it be exhumed and cremated, the campaign was unsuccessful due to the charities who received the money from Savile's will rejecting the cost of £20,000. On 28 October, it was reported that Savile's cottage in Glen Coe had been vandalised with spray-paint and the door damaged. The cottage was sold in May 2013.

In 2012, Richard Harrison, a long-serving psychiatric nurse at Broadmoor Hospital, said that Savile had long been regarded by staff as "a man with a severe personality disorder and a liking for children." Another nurse, Bob Allen, considered Savile to be a psychopath, stating: "A lot of the staff said he should be behind bars." Allen also said that he had once reported Savile to his supervisor for apparent improper conduct with a juvenile, but no action was taken. Psychologists in The Guardian and The Herald argued that Savile exhibited the dark triad of personality traits: narcissism, Machiavellianism, and psychopathy.

Savile's estate, believed to be worth about £4–4.3 million, was frozen by its executors, NatWest bank, in view of the possibility that those alleging that they had been assaulted by Savile could make claims for damages. After "a range of expenses" were charged to the estate, a remainder of about £3.3 million was available to compensate victims, those victims not having a claim against another entity (such as the BBC or the National Health Service) being given priority, and all victims limited to a maximum claim of £60,000 against all entities combined. The compensation scheme was approved in late 2014 by the courts.

Most of Savile's honours were rescinded following the sexual abuse claims. As a knighthood expires when the holder dies, it cannot be posthumously revoked. The Cabinet Office stated in September 2021, with reference to his OBE and knighthood, that "The Forfeiture Committee can confirm that had James Wilson Vincent Savile been convicted of the crimes of which he is accused, forfeiture proceedings would have commenced." Episodes of Top of the Pops hosted by him are not repeated.

On 26 June 2014, UK Secretary of State for Health Jeremy Hunt delivered a public apology in the House of Commons to the patients of the National Health Service abused by Savile. He confirmed that complaints had been raised before 2012 but were ignored by the bureaucratic system:

"Savile was a callous, opportunistic, wicked predator who abused and raped individuals, many of them patients and young people, who expected and had a right to expect to be safe. His actions span five decades – from the 1960s to 2010. ... As a nation at that time we held Savile in our affection as a somewhat eccentric national treasure with a strong commitment to charitable causes. Today's reports show that in reality he was a sickening and prolific sexual abuser who repeatedly exploited the trust of a nation for his own vile purposes."

In April 2022, Netflix released a two-part documentary, Jimmy Savile: A British Horror Story, commissioned from 72 Films. It covered the life and career of Savile, his history of committing sexual abuse, and the scandal that occurred after his death in 2011, when numerous complaints were raised about his behaviour.

=== Dramatisation ===
In October 2020, the BBC announced a television mini-series with the working title The Reckoning, intended to recount Savile's rise to fame and the sexual abuse scandal that emerged after his death. The drama was originally planned to appear in the BBC's autumn 2022 schedule, but after a delay for re-editing, it was broadcast in October 2023. A source said, "The four-part drama is being edited in such a meticulous and careful way, so as not to create more pain and suffering for Savile's victims." It was based in part on the book In Plain Sight: the Life and Lies of Jimmy Savile by Dan Davies.

Writer Neil McKay and producer Jeff Pope had previously worked together on dramatisations on the murders of Fred West, the disappearance of Shannon Matthews, and the murders of Stephen Port. In September 2021, Steve Coogan was cast as Savile; he said he did not take the decision lightly, and that it was a "horrific story which – however harrowing – needs to be told."

== Honours and awards ==
- In the 1972 New Year Honours, Savile was appointed an Officer of the Most Excellent Order of the British Empire (OBE) for personal services to hospitals and to charities.
- In the 1990 Queen's Birthday Honours, Savile was knighted by Queen Elizabeth II for charitable services. Prime Minister Margaret Thatcher had made four attempts to have him knighted before succeeding in her final year in office. Following the allegations of sexual abuse, British Prime Minister David Cameron suggested in October 2012 that it would be possible for Savile's honours to be rescinded by the Honours Forfeiture Committee. A Cabinet Office spokesman said that there was no procedure to posthumously revoke an OBE or knighthood, as these honours automatically expire when a person dies, but that the committee might consider introducing a process to do so in the light of Savile's case. On 30 September 2021, the Forfeiture Committee published a statement in The London Gazette stating that "the Director for Public Prosecutions has stated that criminal prosecutions should have occurred during his lifetime, based on the evidence" and confirmed that "had James Wilson Vincent Savile been convicted of the crimes of which he is accused, forfeiture proceedings would have commenced."
- Savile was honoured with a Papal knighthood by being made a Knight Commander of the Pontifical Equestrian Order of Saint Gregory the Great (KCSG) by Pope John Paul II in 1990. After the scandal broke, the Catholic Church in England and Wales asked the Holy See to consider stripping Savile of the honour. In October 2012, Father Federico Lombardi told BBC News "The Holy See firmly condemns the horrible crimes of sexual abuse of minors, [and the honour] in the light of recent information should certainly not have been bestowed ... As there does not exist any permanent official list of persons who have received papal honours in the past, it is not possible to strike anyone off a list that does not exist. The names of recipients of papal honours do not appear in the Pontifical Year Book and the honour expires with the death of the individual".
- In 1996, Savile was appointed an Honorary Fellow of the Royal College of Radiologists (Hon FRCR).
- Savile was awarded the Cross pro Merito Melitensi by the Sovereign Military Order of Malta.

=== Posthumously withdrawn honours ===
Many honours, including some of Savile's, cease to exist on the death of the holder; there is nothing to rescind if misdeeds are later found. Knighthoods, for example, expire with the holder. Other honours of Savile's were withdrawn or removed from lists when his abuse became known after his death:

- In the 1970s, Savile was awarded an honorary green beret by the Royal Marines for completing the Royal Marine Commando speed march, 30 miles (48 km) across Dartmoor carrying 30 pounds (14 kg) of kit. The honour itself expires upon death of the marine so that Savile's did not need to be revoked, but Savile was listed as having received it. Following the allegations of child abuse, however, the Royal Marines ordered that any certification granted to Savile or mention of Savile's name in their records be expunged immediately.
- Savile was awarded the honorary degree of Doctor of Laws (LLD) by the University of Leeds in 1986, which was posthumously revoked in 2012.
- In 2009, Savile was awarded an Honorary Doctorate of Arts (Hon DA) by the University of Bedfordshire in recognition of his work for the National Spinal Injuries Centre at Stoke Mandeville Hospital, which was posthumously rescinded in October 2012.
- Savile was made a Freeman of the Borough of Scarborough in 2005. This honour was removed in November 2012.

== Filmography ==
Year	TItle	Role	Notes
1959–1979	Juke Box Jury	Panelist	22 episodes
1960	Young at Heart	Presenter	Alongside Valerie Masters
1961–1964	Thank Your Lucky Stars	Guest DJ	11 episodes
1964	Big Beat '64	Presenter	TV special
1964–1984, 1988, 2001, 2003, 2006	Top of the Pops	Presenter	
1965	Pop Gear	Presenter	Film (American title Go Go Mania)
1966	New Musical Express Poll Winners' Concert	Presenter	TV special
1969	Songs of Praise	Guest Presenter	1 episode
1969	Pop Go The Sixties	Co-presenter	TV special; alongside Elfi von Kalckreuth
1973–1974	Clunk, Click	Presenter	
1975–1994	Jim'll Fix It	Presenter	
1978	Network	Presenter	1 episode; "Jimmy Savile's Yorkshire Speakeasy"
1979–2009	This Is Your Life	Guest	8 episodes
1999	Have I Got News For You	Panelist	1 episode
2000	When Louis Met Jimmy	Himself	
2000	Meet Ricky Gervais	Guest	1 episode
2000	I Love 1970's	Presenter	1 episode
2001	Top of the Pops: The True Story	Presenter	Show 1
2004	Ant & Dec's Saturday Night Takeaway	Guest	1 episode
2006	Celebrity Big Brother	Guest Housemate	2 episodes
2007	Jim'll Fix It Strikes Again	Presenter	

== Other work ==
Books

- Savile, Jimmy. As it Happens, ISBN 0-214-20056-6, Barrie & Jenkins 1974 (autobiography)
- Savile, Jimmy. Love is an Uphill Thing, ISBN 0-340-19925-3, Coronet 1976 (paperback edition of As it Happens)
- Savile, Jimmy. God'll Fix It, ISBN 0-264-66457-4, Mowbray, Oxford 1979
- Savile, Jimmy (1980). "Contributor". David Jacob's Book of Celebrities' Jokes & Anecdotes. By Jacobs, David. Robson Books. p. 130. ISBN 0860511251.

Recordings

- 1962, "Ahab the Arab" with Brian Poole and the Tremeloes. Decca, F11493 (single)
