= Stem mixing and mastering =

Method of mixing audio material

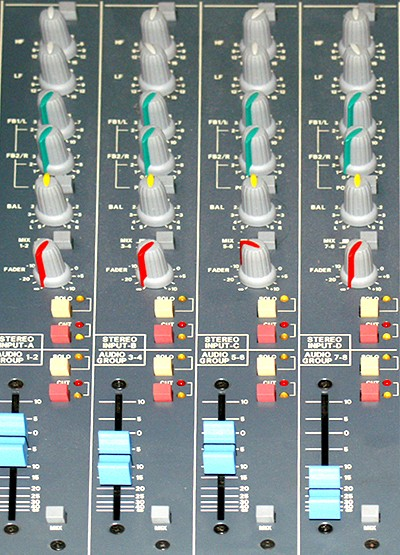
Image of Sub-group (stem) buses on a mixing console.

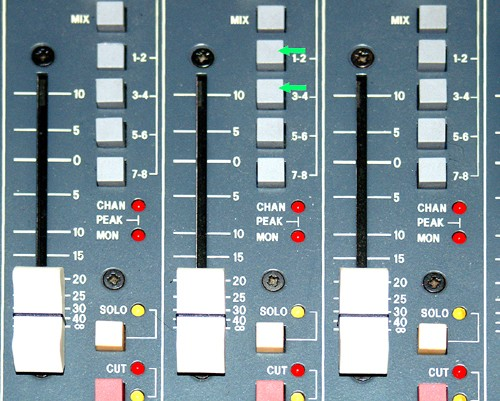
Image of group assign features on individual mix channels of a mixing console. Green arrows indicate group assign buttons.

Stem-mixing is a method of mixing audio material based on creating groups of audio tracks called stems and processing them separately prior to combining them into a final master mix. Stems are also sometimes referred to as submixes, subgroups, or buses.

The distinction between a stem and a separation is rather unclear. Some consider stem manipulation to be the same as separation mastering, although others consider stems to be sub-mixes to be used along with separation mastering. It depends on how many separate channels of input are available for mixing and/or at which stage they are on the way towards reducing them to a final stereo mix.

The technique originated in the 1960s, with the introduction of mixing boards equipped with the capability to assign individual inputs to sub-group faders and to work with each sub-group (stem mix) independently from the others. The approach is widely used in recording studios to control, process and manipulate entire groups of instruments such as drums, strings, or backup vocals, in order to streamline and simplify the mixing process. Additionally, as each stem-bus usually has its own inserts, sends and returns, the stem-mix (sub-mix) can be routed independently through its own signal processing chain, to achieve a different effect for each group of instruments. A similar method is also utilised with digital audio workstations (DAWs), where separate groups of audio tracks may be digitally processed and manipulated through discrete chains of plugins.

Stem-mastering is a technique derived from stem mixing. Just as in stem-mixing, the individual audio tracks are grouped together, to allow for independent control and signal processing of each stem, and can be manipulated independently from each other. Most of the mastering engineers require music producers to have at least -3db headroom at each individual track before starting stem mastering process. The reason for this is to leave more space in the mix to make the mastered version sound cleaner and louder. Even though it is not commonly practiced by mastering studios, it does have its proponents.

== Stem ==
In audio production, a stem is a group of audio sources mixed together, usually by one person, to be dealt with downstream as one unit. A single stem may be delivered in mono, stereo, or in multiple tracks for surround sound.

In sound mixing for film, the preparation of stems is a common stratagem to facilitate the final mix. Dialogue, music and sound effects, called "D-M-E", are brought to the final mix as separate stems. Using stem mixing, the dialogue can easily be replaced by a foreign-language version, the effects can easily be adapted to different mono, stereo and surround systems, and the music can be changed to fit the desired emotional response. If the music and effects stems are sent to another production facility for foreign dialogue replacement, these non-dialogue stems are called "M&E". The dialogue stem is used by itself when editing various scenes together to construct a trailer of the film; after this some music and effects are mixed in to form a cohesive sequence.

In music mixing for recordings and for live sound, stems are subgroups of similar sound sources. When a large project uses more than one person mixing, stems can facilitate the job of the final mix engineer. Such stems may consist of all of the string instruments, a full orchestra, just background vocals, only the percussion instruments, a single drum set, or any other grouping that may ease the task of the final mix. Stems prepared in this fashion may be blended together later in time, as for a recording project or for consumer listening, or they may be mixed simultaneously, as in a live sound performance with multiple elements. For instance, when Barbra Streisand toured in 2006 and 2007, the audio production crew used three people to run three mixing consoles: one to mix strings, one to mix brass, reeds and percussion, and one under main engineer Bruce Jackson's control out in the audience, containing Streisand's microphone inputs and stems from the other two consoles.

Stems may be supplied to a musician in the recording studio so that the musician can adjust a headphones monitor mix by varying the levels of other instruments and vocals relative to the musician's own input. Stems may also be delivered to the consumer so they can listen to a piece of music with a custom blend of the separate elements.

Stems can also be used by DJs for performing DJ sets and creating mashups. If music is not available in stem format, software and online services can extract song elements such as vocals, instruments, and drums into separate files.

== See also ==
- List of musical works released in a stem format
- Stem Player
