= Djay (software) =

Digital music mixing software

djay

- Main window
- Developer: algoriddim
- Stable release: 5.2.4 / 1 October 2024
- Operating system: Mac OS X, iOS, Windows, Android, visionOS, Meta Quest
- Type: Music software
- License: Proprietary
- Website: algoriddim.com

djay is a digital music mixing software program for DJs on macOS, Microsoft Windows, iOS, Android, visionOS, and Meta Quest created by the German company algoriddim. It allows playback and mixing of digital audio files with a user interface that tries to simulate the concept of "two turntables and a microphone" on a computer. Before the commercial release in November 2007, djay had initially been released as freeware in June 2006. In December 2010 the software was also released for the iPad, and subsequently for iPhone and iPod Touch in March 2011.

Its interface consists of two turntables, a mixer and a music library showing songs and playlists from iTunes.

djay for iPad received an Apple Design Award in 2011.

== Features ==
=== iTunes integration ===
djay's iTunes integration allows the user to mix songs directly from the iTunes library. It provides the option of browsing the library, for example by Playlist, Artist, Album, Genre, Key, or History. Dragging songs onto the turntables in djay, transforms them into virtual records complete with album art.

=== Streaming services ===
djay supports multiple music streaming services:

- djay for macOS, iOS, and Windows supports Apple Music, Tidal, SoundCloud, Beatport, and Beatsource
- djay for macOS and Windows supports Spotify
- djay for Android supports Apple Music, Beatport, Beatsource, Spotify, Tidal, and SoundCloud
- djay for visionOS supports Apple Music

Neural Mix is disabled with music from Apple Music, Spotify, and Tidal. Spotify integration was removed in July 2020 but was added back in November 2025; tracks cannot be cached for offline play.

=== Automix ===
Automix mode enables djay to automatically mix songs from the iTunes library, and play them instantaneously with DJ-style transitions. Using the Automix Queue the user can step in any time and immediately queue up tracks.

=== Transitions ===
djay's instantaneous beat and tempo detection allows the user to match the BPM of two songs for a transition. On pressing the SYNC button the software automatically syncs the BPM of the two songs so that both are smoothly aligned.

=== Record live performance ===
djay allows the user record live mixes and save them in high-quality sound files. It also contains a built-in organizer arranges, previews or exports the recordings.

=== Multi-Touch trackpad control ===
Mac has a tool called the Multi-Touch trackpad. djay can dynamically utilize this trackpad to fully control the software with versatile Multi-Touch gestures. For example, a rotating gestures can adjust the EQ, while two finger swipe gesture can scratch the record and operate the crossfader.

=== Live sampler ===
There is a built-in sample pack featuring 20 high-quality sounds made by ueberschal, a company in the sampling industry. In addition, djay allows the user to create custom samples from the turntables or the microphone.

=== Mixer and EQ controls ===
djay consists of a 3-band equalizers, gain, line faders, and a crossfader that provide the user with the necessary tools needed for a DJ setup to seamlessly blend one song into another.

=== Neural Mix ===
Tracks can be separated individual song elements called stems, allowing instruments, vocals, and drums from multiple tracks to be mixed independently. This is useful for remixing songs, creating instrumental or a cappella versions, and creating mashups. Neural Mix is disabled with Apple Music, Spotify, and Tidal.

=== Harmonic Match ===
The software can automatically detect a song's key and matches it to songs of the same key within the iTunes music library. It also allows the user to transpose songs into different keys, and even sort the entire music library by key. This functionality can be used for harmonic mixing.

=== High-quality audio FX ===
djay includes three FX control panes for different mixing styles: a one-touch panel for instant FX, a custom pane, and a 2D touch interface. Effects include Flanger, Phaser, Echo, Gate, Bit Crusher, Filter (High Pass, Low Pass), as well as six preconfigured instant effects: Absorb, Drift, Sway, Crush, Punch, Twist are bundled in with djay.

=== Beat-matched looping & cue points ===
djay has a range of different looping styles: Auto, Manual and Bounce. The use can manually set loop in and out points, use Auto-Loop to continuously loop part of a song, or remix live using Bounce-Loop to mash up the song, all in perfect sync with the beat.

=== iCloud integration ===
The program can work with iCloud (and iTunes Match), meaning the user can sync it with the iTunes library in the cloud. In other words, tunes are synced between every iOS device connected on the cloud. All of these devices can run djay, and cues and BPM information edited or added in will appear immediately in all of the others. There is a remote control available for iOS to control the djay app from the macOS app over WiFi.

=== Pre-cueing ===
djay allows the user to preview and prepare the next song through headphones before playing it on the main speakers by simply connecting a USB audio interface or splitter cable. The software offers different audio hardware configurations.

=== Live microphone ===
djay allows the user to add live microphone input into the mix. Using Echo or Pitch-Changer effects once can transform vocals for an appropriate MC performance.

=== MIDI controllers ===
djay supports controllers such as Vestax, Numark and other manufacturers. In addition, djay features a MIDI learn system allowing users to configure and map any controller to their preference.

== See also ==
- DJ
- Deejay (Jamaican)
- iTunes
- VirtualDJ
