= The Ghetto Blaster EP =

EP by Street Sweeper Social Club
- Released: August 9, 2010 (EU); August 10, 2010 (U.S.)
- Recorded: Veritas Studios
- Genre: Rap rock, funk rock, alternative rock, punk
- Length: 25:24
- Label: Street Sweeper Social Club Inc. Cooking Vinyl (Europe)
- Producer: Tom Morello

Street Sweeper Social Club chronology
Street Sweeper Social Club (2009)	The Ghetto Blaster EP (2010)

Professional ratings
Review scores
Source	Rating
About.com	2.5/5 stars
Alternative Press	3/5 stars
Consequence of Sound	2/5 stars
Franktikmag.com	3/5 stars
Kikaxemusic.com	4.5/5 stars
Rolling Stone	3/5 stars
Uncut	3/5 stars
USA Today	3.5/5 stars

The Ghetto Blaster EP is the first EP from the rap rock supergroup Street Sweeper Social Club, released on August 10, 2010. It features covers of "Paper Planes" by M.I.A. and "Mama Said Knock You Out" by LL Cool J as well as a remix of the band's second single "Promenade." They also cover The Coup song "Everythang". It has also been confirmed that the full touring band has recorded on the album. Tom Morello spoke about the EP in a press release, saying that they shot for an interesting combination of groups. "On The Ghetto Blaster EP we were shooting for a combo of the first Clash record and the Ohio Players greatest hits, interwoven with tractor trailer size riffs of course. This record definitely has more of a 'band' feel than the first, and Boots’ lyrics and delivery have never been sharper." Boots Riley has also said of the EP “We got a new EP that’s going to come out called The Ghetto Blaster EP. [You can expect] hard, hard, hard music and some raw as lyrics on top.”

== Music ==
The EP features three covers. The band covered "Paper Planes" whilst performing on the Nine Inch Nails and Jane's Addiction tour, "We needed a hot cover tune to lay to waste the goth hordes that were awaiting us," says Morello. "I asked Boots to give me some ideas, and he suggested 'Paper Planes' and two Justin Bieber songs, so we went with 'Paper Planes.'" Morello has also stated that he records his guitar riffs on audio cassette much to the annoyance of Boots Riley who has had difficulty in finding a cassette player. The band has also performed their cover of "Mama Said Knock You Out" and "Ghetto Blaster" live. Their cover of "Everythang" by The Coup was performed back in 2008 at the May Day/Immigration Rally in Chicago.

== Track listing ==
All songs written by: Tom Morello and Boots Riley except: "Paper Planes" written by M.I.A. and Diplo and "Mama Said Knock You Out" written by M. Williams and J.T. Smith.

No.	Title	Length
1.	"Ghetto Blaster"	3:26
2.	"Everythang" (The Coup cover)	3:40
3.	"Paper Planes" (M.I.A. cover)	2:55
4.	"The New Fuck You"	3:25
5.	"Scars (Hold That Pose)"	3:53
6.	"Mama Said Knock You Out" (LL Cool J cover)	4:25
7.	"Promenade" (Guitar Fury Remix)	3:40

== Personnel ==
- Boots Riley - vocals/Lyrics
- Tom Morello - guitar/Background Vocals
- Carl Restivo - guitar/Background Vocals
- Dave Gibbs - bass/Background Vocals
- Eric Gardner - drums, percussion
