= Young at Heart (1960 TV series) =

- Genre: Music
- Presented by: Jimmy Savile; Valerie Masters
- Country of origin: United Kingdom
- No. of series: 1
- No. of episodes: 8

Production
- Production company: Tyne Tees Television

Original release
- Network: ITV
- Release: 4 May 1960.

Young at Heart is a British television music programme presented by Jimmy Savile and Valerie Masters. Produced by Tyne Tees Television in Newcastle upon Tyne for ITV, the show was launched in May 1960 and ran for eight episodes.

Young at Heart was Savile's first television series. Four years after presenting this music show for Tyne Tees, he would become the first presenter of the BBC's Top of the Pops.

== Bibliography ==
- Phillips, Geoff (1998). Memories of Tyne Tees Television. Durham: G P Electronic Services. ISBN 0-9522480-6-9.
