= Stem (audio) =

Collection of sounds to be grouped with other collections in production

In audio production, a stem is a discrete or grouped collection of audio sources mixed together, usually by one person, to be dealt with downstream as one unit. A single stem may be delivered in mono, stereo, or in multiple tracks for surround sound.

The beginnings of the process can be found in the production of early non-silent films. In Das Land ohne Frauen (Land Without Women), the first entirely German-made feature-length dramatic talkie released in 1929, about one-quarter of the movie contained dialogue, which was strictly segregated from the special effects and music.

== Mixing for films ==
In sound mixing for film, the preparation of stems is a common stratagem to facilitate the final mix. Dialog, music and sound effects, called "D-M-E", are brought to the final mix as separate stems. Using stem mixing, the dialog can easily be replaced by a foreign-language version, the effects can easily be adapted to different mono, stereo and surround systems, and the music can be changed to fit the desired emotional response. If the music and effects stems are sent to another production facility for foreign dialog replacement, these non-dialog stems are called "M&E". The dialog stem is used by itself when editing various scenes together to construct a trailer of the film; after this some music and effects are mixed in to form a cohesive sequence.

== Live sound mixing ==
When mixing music for recordings and for live sound, a stem is a group of similar sound sources. When a large project uses more than one person mixing, stems can facilitate the job of the final mix engineer. Such stems may consist of all of the string instruments, a full orchestra, just background vocals, only the percussion instruments, a single drum set, or any other grouping that may ease the task of the final mix. Stems prepared in this fashion may be blended together later in time, as for a recording project or for consumer listening, or they may be mixed simultaneously, as in a live sound performance with multiple elements. For instance, when Barbra Streisand toured in 2006 and 2007, the audio production crew used three people to run three mixing consoles: one to mix strings, one to mix brass, reeds and percussion, and one under main engineer Bruce Jackson's control out in the audience, containing Streisand's microphone inputs and stems from the other two consoles.

== Studio adjustments ==
Stems may be supplied to a musician in the recording studio so that the musician can adjust a headphone's monitor mix by varying the levels of other instruments and vocals relative to the musician's own input. Stems may also be delivered to the consumer so they can listen to a piece of music with a custom blend of the separate elements. (See List of musical works released in a stem format.)

== Stems made for sale in music production ==
It is common in the 21st century for music producers to sell instrumental music licenses for rappers or singers to perform and record over. One of the most common license types is the "Premium Stem License", where a customer receives the tracked-out stem files of the instrumental. This allows the artists to have more control over the mixing of the final song.

== Stem separation ==
If music is not available in stem format, software can be used to separate song elements such as vocals, instruments, and drums into stems. These stems can then be used for remixing songs, creating instrumental or a cappella versions, and creating mashups, even without permission from the rightsholder.

Software with stem separation functionality includes some digital audio workstations (such as FL Studio), VST plugins, DJ software, and specialized standalone applications (such as iZotope RX and Spleeter, Stemsplit).

== DJing ==
Stems can be used for mixing in live DJ sets. DJs can selectively mix song elements such as instruments, vocals, and drums from multiple tracks while performing live.

Live stem mixing can be done with music released in a stem format or with music processed through stem separation. DJ software with stem separation functionality may save stems in discrete audio files (playable on any DJ gear) or in a proprietary file format (playable only on compatible software hardware). Some DJ software is capable of real-time stem separation, allowing stem mixing with standard music files or even with streaming music; however, due to the processing power required, as of 2025 real-time stem separation on dedicated hardware is not yet widely available. Although Denon released beta firmware for real-time stem separation on its Prime 4+ dedicated hardware controller, audio quality was poor and this functionality was later removed and replaced it with stem mixing functionality which required stem files exported from a computer running its Engine DJ software.

Some streaming services limit or disable stem separation in DJ software. In October 2023, Tidal disabled stem separation functionality for DJs; Tidal has since re-enabled this functionality but with an additional subscription fee. Stem separation is disabled for Spotify and Apple Music. Beatport allows stem separation on compatible software, such as Serato DJ.

DJ software with stem separation capability includes Rekordbox, Serato DJ, VirtualDJ, Djay, Traktor, and Engine DJ.

== See also ==
- Stem mixing and mastering
- List of musical works released in a stem format
- Stem Player
