= Audio bus =

Signal path used to combine individual audio signals

In audio engineering, a bus (alternate spelling buss, plural busses) is a signal path that can be used to combine (sum) individual audio signal paths together. It is typically used to group several individual audio tracks which can be then manipulated, as a group, like another track. This can be achieved by routing the signal physically by way of switches or cable patches on a mixing console, or by manipulating software features on a digital audio workstation (DAW).

By using buses, an engineer may apply audio signal processing to entire groups of tracks. For example, lead vocals and backup vocals may be mixed and routed through a single compressor, creating a result unique from that reached by compressing each track individually, while reducing the overall amount of hardware or digital memory required for processing. A technique known as stem mixing and mastering relies on the use of busses to mix tracks down to stems for processing before mixing down to the stereo bus (also called "master channel" or "2-bus"). This usually reduces the amount of processing applied to the stereo bus and increases the control the engineer has over the dynamics and levels of the overall mix. Busses can also be helpful when working on complicated audio projects with many tracks, where an engineer may wish to apply changes to multiple tracks at once, such as all of the drum mics or all of the vocal mics.

== See also ==
- Bus (computing)
- Live sound mixing
