= Valerie Masters =

British singer (born 1940)

- Born: 24 April 1940 (age 85); Stepney Green, London, England

Valerie Masters (born 24 April 1940) is a British former singer, television and radio presenter and actress, who recorded and performed in the late 1950s and 1960s.

== Life and career ==
She was born in Stepney Green, East London, the daughter of Jacob Muster and Sarah "Sally" Sassienie. She started work as a typist and personal secretary for the mayor of Stepney before, at the age of 17, being introduced to Ray Ellington and shortly afterwards joining his band as featured vocalist, to replace Marion Ryan. She remained with Ellington's band until 1959, and also recorded as a solo singer. Her first record, "The Secret of Happiness", was released on the Fontana label in April 1958. She continued to record a series of singles for Fontana through to 1961; none made the official UK Singles Chart although her 1960 single "Banjo Boy" made the lower reaches of the New Musical Express's own chart. Between 1959 and 1961 she had her own show on Radio Luxembourg, Valerie and her Boyfriends, and in 1960 she represented Britain in the European Song Contest (unrelated to the Eurovision Song Contest), following which she became popular in Scandinavia, Germany and the Netherlands. In 1961, she failed in her attempt to represent the UK at Eurovision, finishing seventh in the A Song for Europe competition with the song "Too Late For Tears". Masters also appeared frequently on BBC radio and on television, as well as performing live in cabaret and clubs, often with Ellington's former pianist Dick Katz (1916-1981); they married in 1961.

In May 1960, she co-hosted, with Jimmy Savile, a short series of teen-oriented programmes, Young at Heart, for Tyne Tees Television; these were Savile's first television appearances. She also worked for Border Television. She sang the theme song for the 1961 film The Hellions, and also recorded commercials and worked as a backing singer. In 1963, she recorded for the His Master's Voice label, and in 1964 issued the single "Christmas Calling", produced by Joe Meek and featuring session guitarist Ritchie Blackmore. She later recorded for Polydor and Columbia, her last record being released in 1969. She appeared, acting the role of a singer, in the 1979 television drama series Secret Army, and in the early 1980s made appearances in Russ Abbot's Saturday Madhouse.

She later ran her own bridal wear business with her daughter, in Guildford, Surrey.

== Bibliography ==
- Phillips, Geoff (1998). Memories of Tyne Tees Television. Durham: G P Electronic Services. ISBN 0-9522480-6-9.
