= Serato =

Music software company

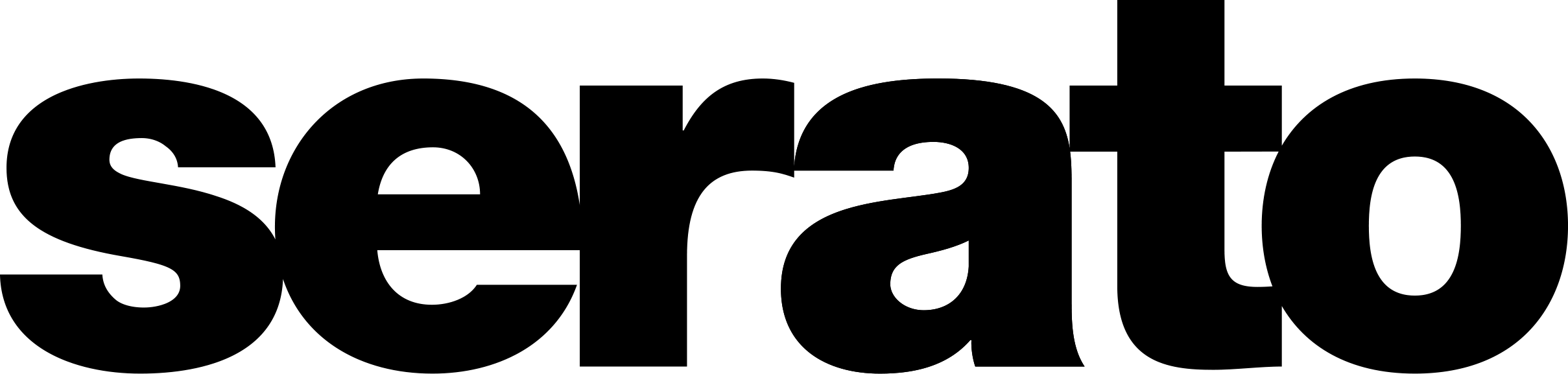
- Industry: Music software
- Founders: Steve West and AJ Bertenshaw
- Headquarters: Auckland, New Zealand
- Website: serato.com

Serato (stylized in all lowercase; /səˈrɑːtoʊ/) is a music software company founded in 1998 in Auckland, New Zealand by Steve West and AJ Bertenshaw.

== History ==
West and Bertenshaw met in computer science class at the University of Auckland. When West created an algorithm that could change the tempo of a recorded track without changing its pitch, Bertenshaw realized the opportunity to build upon the idea. The first published product, "Pitch 'n Time", which built on the original audio manipulation concept, was pitched to various companies like Pioneer and Sony but failed to gain traction with the music side of the industry. However, the idea was received more positively in Hollywood, where it quickly became useful editing tool for filmmakers.

== Software ==
=== Serato DJ ===
Serato DJ is digital music mixing software for DJing. Serato DJ supports DJ mixing with digital music files and streaming music and is compatible with digital DJ controllers or digital vinyl. Serato DJ includes visual components including waveforms for beatmatching and other information about the sound being produced by the system. DJ controllers from various manufacturers are supported, including Pioneer DJ, Denon DJ, and Roland.

In 2018, Serato changed the names of its DJ software from Serato DJ to Serato DJ Pro, and from Serato DJ Intro to Serato DJ Lite. The new versions use 64-bit software architecture. Serato also partners with hardware developers such as Pioneer to create Serato-branded DJ controllers.

Serato DJ supports stem separation for independently mixing the vocals, drums, bass, and melody of tracks. Mixing with stems is useful for remixing songs, creating instrumental or a cappella versions, and creating mashups.

In 2017, Serato began integrating with streaming services. Serato DJ Pro is compatible with the music streaming services Spotify, Apple Music, Tidal, Beatport, Beatsource, and SoundCloud. Stem separation is disabled with streaming music from Spotify and Apple Music. Tidal requires an add-on subscription called "DJ Extension" in order to use stem separation. Stem separation is supported with streaming music from Beatport. Recording is disabled when using streaming music. Tracks from Beatport and Beatsource can be cached for offline use when subscribed to Beatport Professional or Beatsource Pro+, respectively; Spotify does not support caching tracks offline.

=== Serato studio ===
A DAW (digital audio workstation) for music producers and artists. It features a sample-based interface and a visually oriented layout. In 2021, Serato launched an in-software recording feature allowing artists to record directly into the DAW, Serato also hosts other features such as iTunes sync and stem separation to make sampling easier.

=== Serato Pyro ===
Released in 2016, Serato developed a mobile app called Pyro, which automatically fades songs from a mobile device as they transition from track to track and serves as a playlist creator drawing music from a device’s iTunes library. Pyro also comes preloaded with other song collections curated by different artists and labels.

Serato Pyro was retired in May 2020

=== Serato Sample ===
Seeing an increasing overlap between DJ and producer communities, Serato released a VST plugin named Serato Sample, an audio editing tool using their existing Pitch 'n Time algorithms. On release, it provided functionality for key detection, changing the pitch and tempo of samples, and finding samples similar to another.

In 2023, Serato 2.0 was released with the ability to perform stem isolation using machine learning algorithms.

Serato DJ (For IOS)

In 2026, Serato released version 5.0 of its DJ software, which introduced a new app for iOS devices.
