= Street Sweeper Social Club =

American rap/rock supergroup

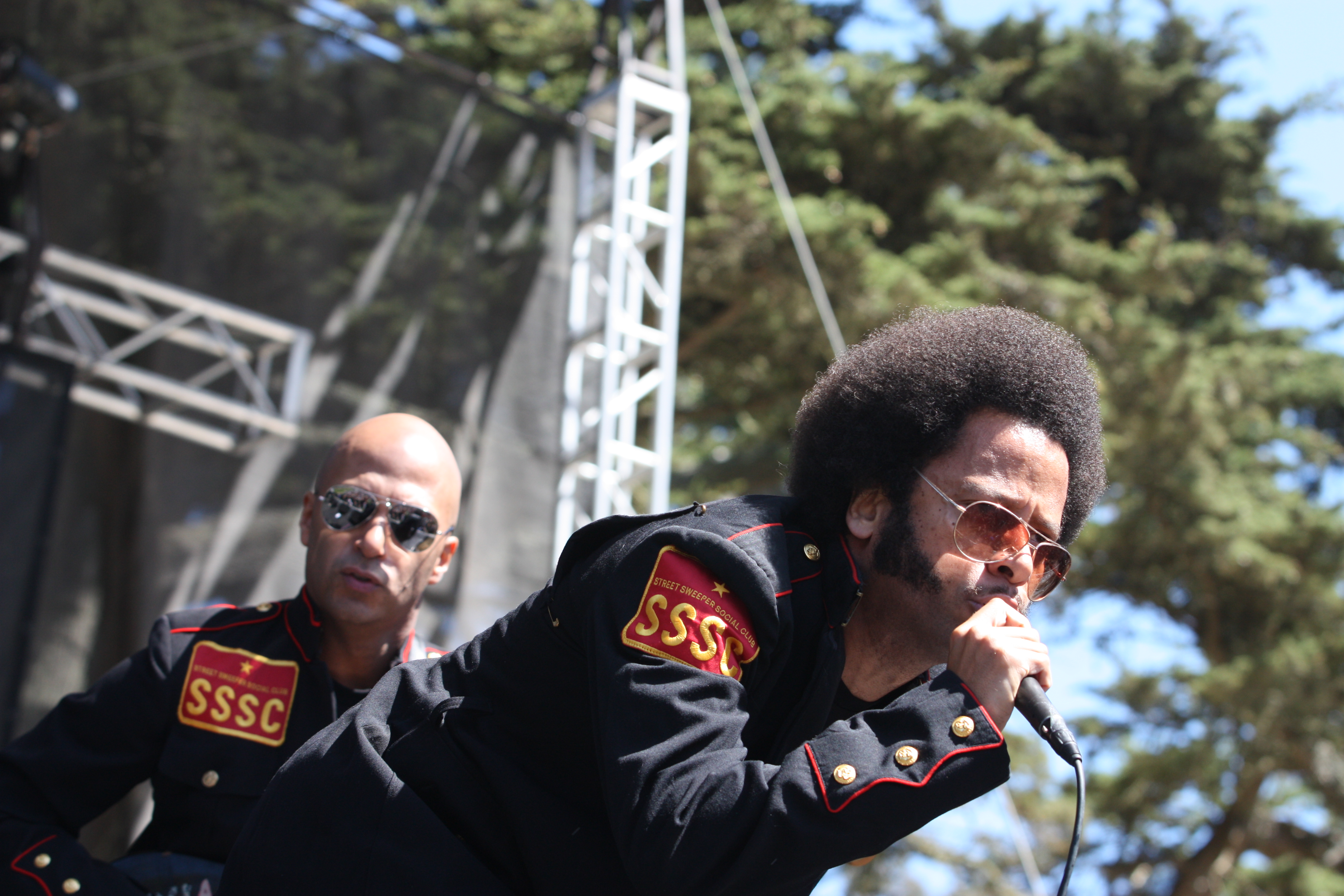
- Morello and Riley performing at Golden Gate Park in 2009.

Background information
- Also known as: SSSC
- Origin: Los Angeles, California
- Genres: Rap rock; funk rock; alternative rock; hard rock; punk rock
- Years active: 2006–2010 (on hiatus)
- Labels: Warner; The Null Corporation
- Members: Tom Morello; Boots Riley

Street Sweeper Social Club is an American rap rock supergroup, formed in Los Angeles, California in 2006. The band primarily consists of guitarist Tom Morello of Rage Against the Machine and vocalist and emcee Boots Riley of the Coup. The band had been testing songs out during Tom Morello's Nightwatchman tour and released an album on June 16, 2009. Stanton Moore drummed for the group for the recording of the album although he did not join the band for the following tour. Street Sweeper Social Club opened for Nine Inch Nails and Jane's Addiction in May 2009. Street Sweeper Social Club describes itself as "more than a band, it's a social club." Their 2010 EP The Ghetto Blaster EP includes covers of M.I.A.'s "Paper Planes" and LL Cool J's "Mama Said Knock You Out".

== Band history ==
=== Formation and debut album (2006–2009) ===
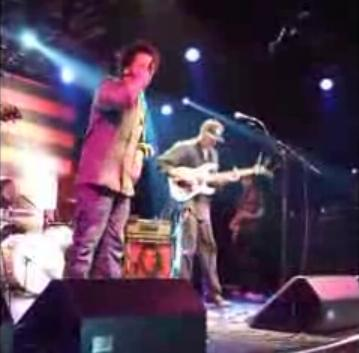
Morello and Riley performing at a Nightwatchman concert.

Morello and Riley first met during Billy Bragg's Tell Us the Truth Tour in 2003 where Morello often joined Riley on stage as his acoustic folk alter ego the Nightwatchman playing acoustic versions of the Coup's songs. After a Coup show in Los Angeles Morello approached Riley over a dinner with the idea of forming a band to play "anthems for the revolution". Morello gave Riley a cassette with instrumental demo songs asking Riley to listen to it, write something and then get back to him. On the 2008 Nightwatchman tour, Riley made frequent appearances on stage to play the song "100 Little Curses" with Morello, which later became the first single released off their debut album. After playing the song, Morello confirmed that an album was in the works and would be out in early 2009. In the Spring of 2009, Street Sweeper Social Club announced a summer tour of the United States with Nine Inch Nails and the recently reunited Jane's Addiction. On March 21, a Nine Inch Nails tour sampler EP titled NINJA was released via digital download containing both Nine Inch Nails, Jane's Addiction and the songs "The Oath" and "Clap for the Killers" from the band which at that time still called themselves Street Sweeper.

For the recording of the band's debut album the duo enlisted the help of drummer Stanton Moore while Morello handled both the guitar and bass playing throughout the recording. It was announced on April 14, 2009 that the band was changing their name from Street Sweeper to Street Sweeper Social Club via Trent Reznor's official blog. In late April 2009, the band revealed details and the release date for the band's self-titled debut album. Warner Music Group released the album on June 16, 2009. In April 2009, former Satellite Party and Freedom Fighter Orchestra instrumentalist Carl Restivo revealed, via his MySpace page, that he has been asked to join the band. Later Eric Gardner and Dave Gibbs joined to play drums and bass respectively completing the band's touring line-up. On June 11, 2009, Street Sweeper Social Club put their entire new album on their MySpace page, before the official release five days later. On June 17, 2009, appeared on Late Night with Jimmy Fallon, playing their debut single "100 Little Curses". On October 14, 2009, Tom Morello and Boots Riley performed alongside Public Enemy at the VH1 Hip Hop Honors.

=== The Ghetto Blaster EP (2010 and onwards) ===
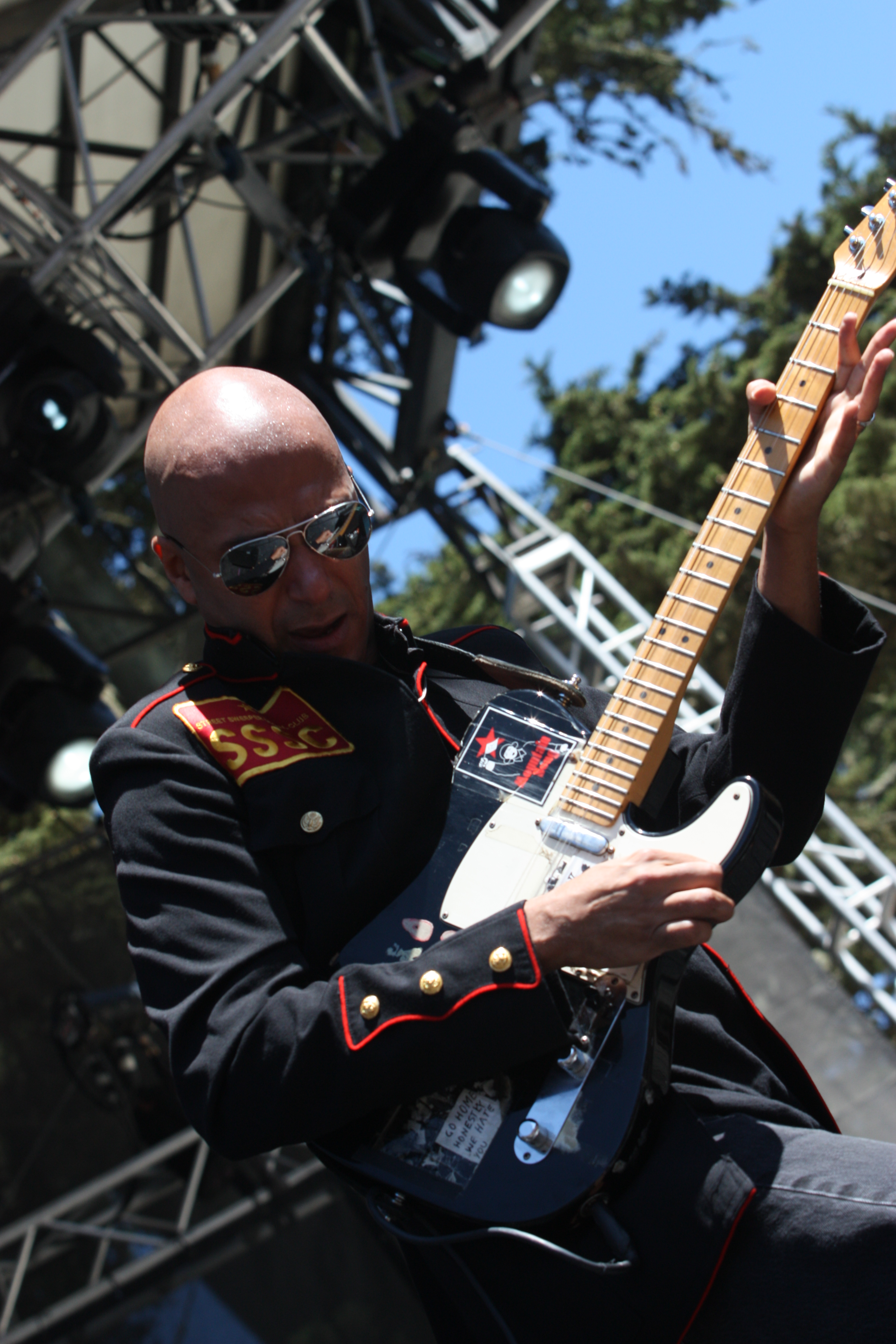
Morello performing live.

The band released The Ghetto Blaster EP in August 2010, the EP features covers of "Paper Planes" by M.I.A and "Mama Said Knock You Out" by LL Cool J. Besides Morello and RIley the album was recorded with touring members Carl Restivo, Dave Gibbs and Eric Gardner. They have performed at Coachella and performed at the 2010 Rock the Bells festival as well as the Voodoo Experience. On August 2, 2010, the band performed their cover of M.I.A's "Paper Planes" on Lopez Tonight to promote the EP. When asked what's next for Street Sweeper Social Club, Riley confirmed that there will be another full length Street Sweeper Social Club album. Street Sweeper Social Club's music video of their cover of MIA's Paper Planes was released on October 5, 2010 via YouTube.

== Band members ==
Official members

- Tom Morello – guitar, bass guitar (2006–present)
- Boots Riley – lead vocals (2006–present)

Touring members

- Carl Restivo – guitar (2009–present)
- Dave Gibbs – bass guitar (2009–present)
- Scott Guzman – drums, percussion (2009–present)
- Daniel Durque – flute, trombone, triangle, cowbell (2009–present)

== Discography ==
=== Studio albums ===
Title	Release
Street Sweeper Social Club	Released: June 16, 2009; Label: Warner; Format: CD

=== Extended plays ===
Title	Release
The Ghetto Blaster EP	Released: August 10, 2010; Label: Cooking Vinyl; Format: CD, Vinyl

=== Singles ===
Title	Release	Album
"100 Little Curses"	2009	Street Sweeper Social Club
"Promenade"	2010	Street Sweeper Social Club
"Paper Planes"	2010	The Ghetto Blaster EP

=== Guest appearances ===
Title	Release	Album
"Clap for the Killers"	2009	NINJA 2009 Tour Sampler EP
"The Oath"	2009	NINJA 2009 Tour Sampler EP
