= Street Sweeper Social Club (album) =

Studio album by Street Sweeper Social Club
- Released: June 16, 2009
- Genre: Rap rock; alternative rock; funk rock; hard rock
- Length: 39:03
- Label: Warner Music Group
- Producer: Tom Morello

Street Sweeper Social Club chronology
NINJA 2009 Tour Sampler (2009)	Street Sweeper Social Club (2009)	The Ghetto Blaster EP (2010)

Singles from Street Sweeper Social Club
- 1. "100 Little Curses" Released: April 27, 2009; 2. "Promenade" Released: September 29, 2009

Professional ratings
Review scores
Source	Rating
Allmusic	2.5/5 stars
PopMatters	3/10 stars
RapReviews	7.5/10 stars
Rolling Stone	4/5 stars
SPIN	6/10 stars
Pitchfork Media	(3.9/10)

Street Sweeper Social Club is the debut self-titled album by American rap rock supergroup Street Sweeper Social Club, composed of guitarist Tom Morello of Rage Against the Machine and Audioslave and rapper/emcee Boots Riley of The Coup. The album was released by Warner Music Group on June 16, 2009.

The first single from the album, entitled "100 Little Curses", premiered on the band's Myspace on April 27, 2009.

Two additional songs from the album: "Clap for the Killers" and "The Oath" were released on the NINJA 2009 Tour Sampler, the EP sampler supporting the 2009 NIN|JA tour with Nine Inch Nails and Jane's Addiction.

Morello describes the album as "revolutionary party jams. It's got huge steamroller riffs combined with depth, charge, funk, while Boots unloads clip after clip of incendiary rhymes rich with satire and venom." Boots Riley added that "this is a time when the working class is being fleeced left and right. More families will be homeless and more people will be jobless. They'll need something to listen to on their iPods while storming Wall Street."

To support the release of the album, the band was confirmed as the opener for the Nine Inch Nails & Jane's Addiction 2009 tour, running from the 8th of May to the 12th of June.

On September 29, 2009, Tom Morello confirmed that "Promenade" was going to be a single via YouTube.

== Track listing ==
All tracks written by Tom Morello and Boots Riley, except where noted.

No.	Title	Length
1.	"Fight! Smash! Win!"	3:35
2.	"100 Little Curses"	4:03
3.	"The Oath"	4:25
4.	"The Squeeze"	3:13
5.	"Clap for the Killers"	3:57
6.	"Somewhere in the World It's Midnight"	3:20
7.	"Shock You Again" (Stanton Moore, Morello, Riley)	2:41
8.	"Good Morning, Mrs. Smith"	3:20
9.	"Megablast" (Moore, Morello, Riley)	3:47
10.	"Promenade"	2:31
11.	"Nobody Moves (Til We Say Go)"	4:13
12.	"Promenade" (Live) (iTunes bonus track)

== Personnel ==
- Tom Morello - guitars, bass, background vocals
- Boots Riley - vocals, lyrics
- Stanton Moore - drums, percussion

=== Additional personnel ===
- Eric Gardner - additional drums on 100 Little Curses
- Steve Perry - background vocals on Promenade
- Dave Gibbs, Carl Restivo, Eric Gardner, Jim Scott, Trevor Welch - additional background vocals
- Jim Scott - recording and mixing at PLYRZ Studio, Santa Clarita, CA
- Kevin Dean - assistant engineer
- Thom Russo - additional engineering at NRG Recording Studios, North Hollywood, CA
- Stephen Marcussen - mastering at Stephen Marcussen Mastering, Hollywood, CA

== Chart performance ==
Chart	Peak position
U.S. Billboard 200	37
U.S. Top Independent Albums	4
