= NINJA 2009 Tour Sampler =

2009 compilation EP from NIN|JA tour

EP / Compilation album by Nine Inch Nails, Jane's Addiction and Street Sweeper Social Club
- Released: March 20, 2009
- Recorded: 2004–2009
- Genre: Alternative rock
- Length: 22:05
- Label: The Null Corporation
- Producer: Trent Reznor

Nine Inch Nails chronology
The Slip (2008)	NINJA 2009 Tour Sampler (2009)	Hesitation Marks (2013)

Jane's Addiction chronology
Up from the Catacombs – The Best of Jane's Addiction (2005)	NINJA 2009 Tour Sampler (2009)	A Cabinet of Curiosities (2009)

Street Sweeper Social Club chronology
NINJA 2009 Tour Sampler (2009)	Street Sweeper Social Club (2009)

NINJA 2009 Tour Sampler (stylized as NIN|JA on the cover) is a free compilation EP by Nine Inch Nails, Jane's Addiction and Street Sweeper Social Club as part of the Nine Inch Nails and Jane's Addiction 2009 NINJA tour. It was released on March 20, 2009, for free, on the tour's official website. Both of Street Sweeper Social Club's songs that appeared on the album, "Clap for The Killers" & "The Oath", later appeared on their self-titled album. The two Nine Inch Nails tracks, "Not So Pretty Now" and "Non-Entity" were both originally recorded during the With Teeth sessions, but did not make it onto the final record. The two Jane's Addiction's songs are re-recorded versions of songs that had originally only live versions, from the band's first official record.

== Track listing ==
No.	Title	Writer(s)	Artist	Length
1.	"Chip Away"	Perry Farrell, Eric Avery, Dave Navarro, Stephen Perkins	Jane's Addiction	2:37
2.	"Not So Pretty Now"	Trent Reznor	Nine Inch Nails	3:50
3.	"Clap for the Killers"	Tom Morello, Boots Riley	Street Sweeper Social Club	3:57
4.	"Whores"	Farrell, Avery, Navarro, Perkins	Jane's Addiction	3:45
5.	"Non-Entity"	Reznor	Nine Inch Nails	4:03
6.	"The Oath"	Morello, Riley	Street Sweeper Social Club	4:26
Total length:				22:05

== Personnel ==
Nine Inch Nails

- Trent Reznor - performance (2, 5), production

Jane's Addiction

- Perry Farrell - vocals (1, 4)
- Eric Avery - bass (1, 4)
- Dave Navarro - guitar (1, 4)
- Stephen Perkins - drums (1, 4)

Street Sweeper Social Club

- Tom Morello - guitar (3, 6)
- Boots Riley - vocals (3, 6)
