= Paper Planes =

Single by M.I.A.

from the album Kala
- Released: 11 February 2008
- Recorded: 2007
- Genre: Alternative hip hop; electro hop; pop
- Length: 3:24
- Label: XL; Interscope
- Songwriters: Maya Arulpragasam; Wesley Pentz; Topper Headon; Paul Simonon; Mick Jones; Joe Strummer
- Producers: M.I.A.; Switch; Diplo

M.I.A. singles chronology
"Jimmy" (2007)	"Paper Planes" (2008)	"Born Free" (2010)

Music video
- "Paper Planes" on YouTube

"Paper Planes" is a song by British recording artist M.I.A. from her second studio album Kala (2007). It was released on 11 February 2008 as the third single from the album. It is produced and co-written by her and Diplo. It appeared in the 2008 film Slumdog Millionaire and on its soundtrack album. The song samples English rock band the Clash's 1982 song "Straight to Hell", leading to its members being credited as co-writers. A downtempo alternative hip hop, pop track combining African folk music elements, the song has a less dance-orientated sound compared to other songs on the album. Its lyrics, inspired by M.I.A.'s own problems obtaining a visa to work in the United States, satirise American perceptions of immigrants from Third World nations.

Its accompanying music video, filmed in Bedford-Stuyvesant, depicts M.I.A. as an undercover dealer and features images of paper planes flying overhead. While the video proved popular on MTV, the network censored the song's cannabis reference and gunshot sounds. The song was M.I.A.'s biggest commercial success, entering the top 20 on charts in several countries including Denmark and the UK. It peaked at number four on the US Billboard Hot 100, becoming M.I.A.'s first and only song to chart in the US top 100 as a lead artist. The song was certified multi-platinum in Canada, the UK and the US and gold in New Zealand.

The unexpected success of "Paper Planes" paralleled M.I.A.'s condemnations of the Sri Lankan government's war crimes against the Tamils, with whom M.I.A. shares ethnic and cultural backgrounds, generating accusations that she supported terrorism. The song received widespread acclaim from contemporary critics, who complimented its musical direction and the subversive, unconventional subject matter. It won awards from the Canadian Independent Music Awards and the American Society of Composers, Authors and Publishers (ASCAP), and earned a Grammy nomination for Record of the Year. The song has received praise in publications such as NME, Pitchfork and Rolling Stone, each naming it among either the best songs of the 2000s decade or of all time. Notable cover versions include ones by Street Sweeper Social Club, the Clientele, Lowkey, Dizzee Rascal, Built to Spill and Rihanna.

== Background and production ==
When I wrote it I'd just gotten in to New York after waiting a long time and that's why I wrote it, just to have a dig. It's about people driving cabs all day and living in a s---ty [sic] apartment and appearing really threatening to society. But not being so. Because, by the time you've finished working a 20-hour shift, you're so tired you [just] want to get home to the family. I don't think immigrants are that threatening to society at all. They're just happy they've survived some war somewhere.

— M.I.A. speaking to Entertainment Weekly about her inspirations for "Paper Planes"

M.I.A. (Mathangi "Maya" Arulpragasam) released her debut studio album Arular in 2005 to critical acclaim. The album, inspired by her father Arul Pragasam's involvement in the Tamil independence movement in Sri Lanka, heavily incorporates themes of conflict and revolution into dance songs. While M.I.A. wanted to work with American producer Timbaland for Arular's follow-up album Kala (2007), her application for a long-term US work visa was rejected. This was allegedly due to her family's connection to the Tamil guerrillas, commonly known as the Tamil Tigers, a claim M.I.A. denied. Her visa problems were also attributed to her criticism of the Sri Lankan government's discrimination and alleged atrocities committed against the Tamils, with whom M.I.A. shares an ethnic and cultural heritage. She expressed this on her politicised album Arular.

M.I.A. began work on "Paper Planes" with American producer Diplo and English DJ Switch in London. The track's downtempo production sets it apart from the rest of Kala, which features dense electronic sounds. Diplo came up with the idea of sampling English rock band the Clash's 1982 song "Straight to Hell" and produced the instrumental track with assistance from Switch. As a result, all members of the Clash were credited as co-writers. M.I.A. said that she recorded her vocals without paying much attention to her singing and finished the song in one take. She drew inspiration for the lyrics from her own troubles gaining a work permit to the US, complaining that the issue was probably "them thinking that I might to [sic] fly a plane into the Trade Center". From her frustration with US immigration policy, M.I.A. developed "Paper Planes" as a satire of American perception of immigrants from war-torn countries.

M.I.A. invited street kids she came across in Brixton to sing the song's chorus. After regaining entry to the US, M.I.A. finalised the track at her home in Bedford-Stuyvesant, a Brooklyn neighbourhood with a high concentration of African Americans, in mid-2007. She recalled that her time living there prompted her to think, "People don't really feel like immigrants or refugees contribute to culture in any way". She added the sound effects of gunshots and a cash register to the chorus. Saying these sounds symbolise stereotypes of immigrants, M.I.A. refused to elaborate and wanted listeners to interpret the song for themselves noting, "America is so obsessed with money, I'm sure they'll get it". She told The Daily Beast that the gunshots embodied political refugees' experiences in war-torn areas, which she described as "a part of our culture as an everyday thing". Revisiting the song in 2013, M.I.A. expressed to Rolling Stone that "Paper Planes" was "a really Baltimore/Brooklyn song for me", partly inspired by her immersion in New York and Baltimore street culture.

== Composition ==
"Paper Planes"
A downtempo alternative hip hop song combining hip hop and African folk music elements, "Paper Planes" satirises American perception of Third World immigrants. The song's chorus features children chanting, gunshots and cash registering sound effects.

"Paper Planes" is a downtempo alternative hip hop and electro hop song with a duration of three minutes and 24 seconds. The song takes a musical approach which incorporates elements of hip hop and African folk music. "Paper Planes" follows what M.I.A. characterised as the "nu world" music style of Kala. It contains a sample of the Clash's song "Straight to Hell". According to the sheet music published at Musicnotes.com by Universal Music Publishing Group, it is written in the time signature of common time with a moderate tempo of 86 beats per minute. The song is composed in the key of D major while M.I.A.'s vocal range spans one octave, from the low-note of F♯_{3} to the high-note of F♯_{4}. The musical composition incorporates verse-chorus form, with a bridge preceding the fourth and final chorus, where a distorted guitar riff provides accompaniment to the piece playing out the coda. The chorus features children chanting and singing, and sound effects of gunshots and a cash register, and was compared to the chorus on Wreckx-N-Effect's 1992 song "Rump Shaker". BBC Radio 1's Fraser McAlpine commented on the discordance between M.I.A.'s "icy, distant" vocals and the "calm and serene" backing track.

The lyrics, epitomising Kala's central theme, satirise American perceptions of visa-seeking foreigners and immigrants from Third World nations. Billboard commented that the content is about class conflict, in which M.I.A. plays the role of a "revolutionary". M.I.A. explained that the "paper planes" in the title and opening lines—"I fly like paper, get high like planes / If you catch me at the border I got visas in my name / If you come around here I make 'em all day"—are counterfeit visas made by the immigrants. The Stranger described the chorus's sound effects as "rock'n'roll swindle, anti-colonial cash register liberation", which complements the song's meaning. The lyrics "No one on the corner had swagger like us / Hit me on the burner prepaid wireless" encapsulate the restrained living conditions of immigrants struggling with monthly mobile phone bills. At the bridge, M.I.A. jokingly plays with her alleged connection to the Tamil militants and the visa problems stemming from it, "Some I murder, some (a some) I let go".

== Release ==
"Paper Planes" is the eleventh track on Kala, which was released in August 2007 by XL Recordings in Europe, Oceania, and through Interscope Records in the US. On 11 February 2008, an extended play (EP) containing "Paper Planes" and five remixes of the song, titled Homeland Security Remixes EP, was released digitally in Europe through XL Recordings, and physically (in 12-inch vinyl format) in the US through Interscope Records. The following day, the remixes EP was made available online in the US. The song was released as a digital single on 15 September through iTunes Stores in Europe. Another EP containing three tracks was released in the UK on 13 October. On the same day, "Paper Planes" was re-released as a two-track CD single in the UK following the song's unexpected commercial success; it contains a remix subtitled "Diplo Street Remix" featuring American rappers Bun B and Rich Boy. The CD was distributed in Australia five days following its UK release. A 7-inch single, featuring a remix by DFA as the B-side, was distributed on 18 November.

== Critical reception ==
"Paper Planes" received widespread acclaim from contemporary publications. The Stranger's Eric Grandy selected the song as Kala's highlight, calling it the album's "most exciting synthesis of the political and the pop, a playful dig into the real, dirty business of rump shaking". Andy Kellman of AllMusic, Michael Hubbard of musicOMH, Jon Pareles of Blender and Emma Warren of The Observer named it a standout on the well-received Kala. Stylus Magazine's Ewen McGarvey described the song as "narcotic, gorgeous". Alex Miller from NME commented that "Paper Planes" was Kala's only radio-friendly track, but still reflected M.I.A. as "the inheritor of true rebel music in an era of corporate punks". The Houston Chronicle's Joey Guerra complimented the song's gunshot and cash register sounds that showcased M.I.A.'s "stunning international flow" and joked that the US should "immediately extend an open-door policy" to welcome the artist. BBC Radio 1's Fraser McAlpine awarded the song a five-out-of-five-stars rating, labelling it a "clever song" that demands listeners pay attention.

Writing for Clash, Colm Larkin characterised "Paper Planes" as a "downtempo masterpiece that's like a torch song for the world's disaffected and poor" and said of M.I.A.'s seemingly "meaningless" lyrics about visa problems: "When the music is this profound she doesn't need to make sense". For Pitchfork's Mark Pytlik, the track's "island-tinged nursery rhyme" epitomised M.I.A.'s combination of "island patois and Westernized slang", which "always leads her to interesting places". Tom Breihan of The Village Voice noted the song included M.I.A.'s trademark political overtones in her music, and lauded it for employing "layers of implication". Karim Maksoud from DIY praised the song's theme of "coarse fatalism, superficiality and backstabbing acerbity of the modern urban life" and dubbed the track a "tuneful amalgam of influences and exotic dynamic". Ann Powers of the Los Angeles Times called "Paper Planes" the epitome of the album that conveys multiple layers of meaning. The Independent's Andy Gill was less complimentary, opining that the track's gun and murder references blemished "an otherwise fine album".

At the end of 2007, "Paper Planes" was named one of the year's best songs on contemporary publications' lists, including rankings at number 44 (Stylus Magazine), number eight (PopMatters) and number six (Fact). The Diplo remix featuring Bun B and Rich Boy was ranked at numbers 27 and four by Vibe and Pitchfork, respectively. The song placed at number six on the 2007 Pazz & Jop poll, an annual mass critics' poll conducted by The Village Voice. Following its single release in 2008, "Paper Planes" continued to appear on multiple year-end lists, being placed at number 26 (NME), number eight (Mixmag), number three (Entertainment Weekly), number two (Blender) and number one (Spin, Slant Magazine and Rolling Stone Brasil). It topped the 2008 Pazz & Jop poll by The Village Voice. "Paper Planes" received a Grammy nomination for Record of the Year at the 51st annual ceremony in 2009. The track won a 2009 PRS Award from the American Society of Composers, Authors and Publishers (ASCAP) and Favourite International Single at the 2009 Canadian Independent Music Awards.

== Music video ==
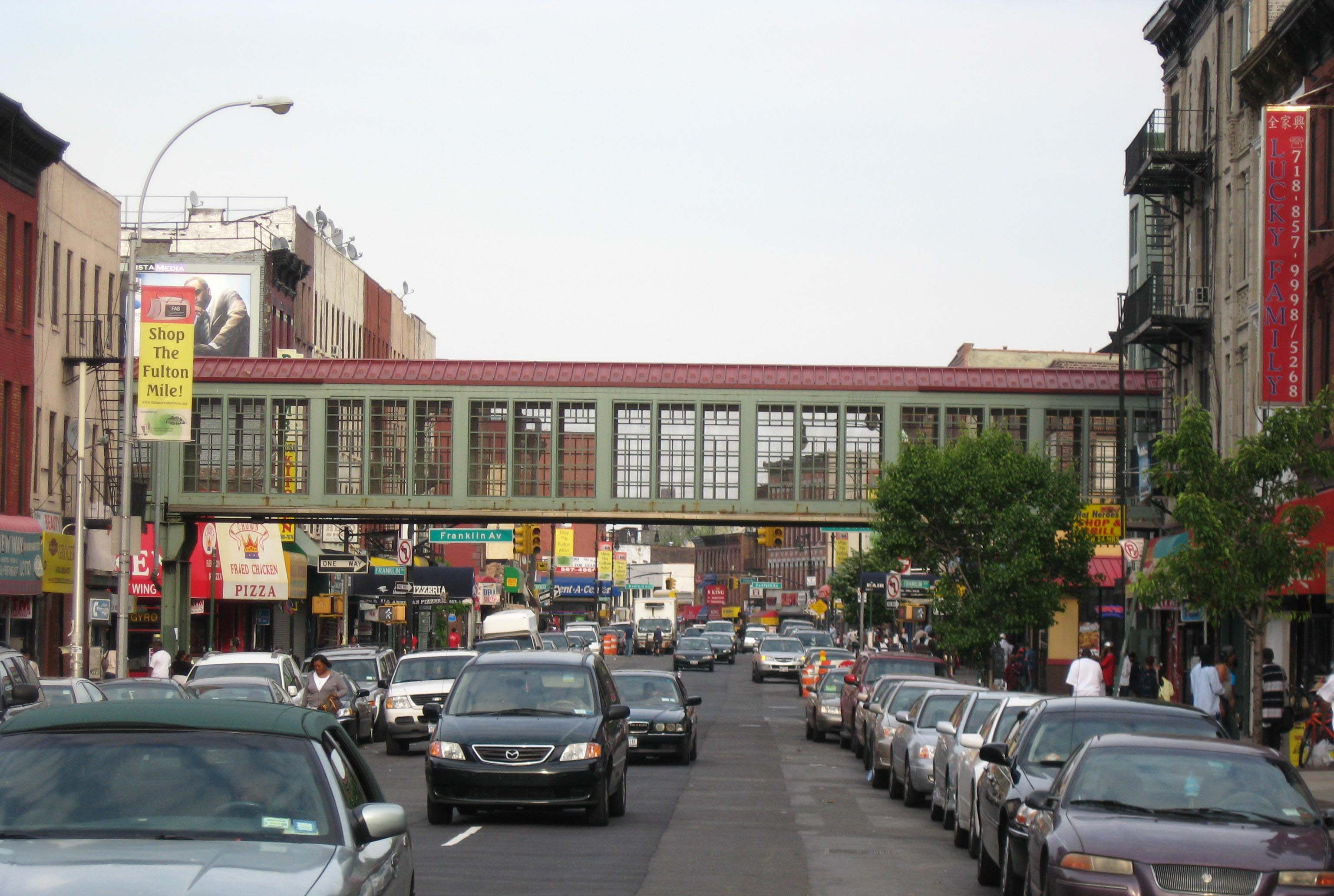
The video was filmed in Bedford-Stuyvesant, a neighbourhood which prompted M.I.A. to contemplate American perceptions of immigrants.

Director Bernard Gourley, known for his work with hip hop artists, directed the music video for "Paper Planes". Shot in Bedford-Stuyvesant, it depicts M.I.A. as an undercover dealer. Initially planning to record the video in a factory on the border of Ecuador, M.I.A. was unable to do so because she was touring the US and had only one day off to shoot it. The visual begins with several paper planes flying over Brooklyn Bridge, shot in black-and-white. Throughout the clip, coloured scenes show M.I.A. singing and dancing along streets in the Bedford-Stuyvesant neighbourhood, selling food from a van to locals, and dealing valuables such as chains, watches and cash. Nigerian rapper Afrikan Boy portrays M.I.A.'s food vending partner, and Mike D & Ad-Rock from the hip hop group Beastie Boys make a cameo appearance as their buyers. The video ends with a black-and-white scene of paper planes flying over a neighbourhood.

The music video premiered on MTV's website on 15 December 2007 and received its first broadcast on the network's series Total Request Live (TRL) the following day. MTV censored the song's cannabis reference in the lyric "Sticks and stones and weed and bongs" and the gunshot sound effects. M.I.A. expressed disappointment on her MySpace account, saying that the network "sabotaged" the video's message, despite it having, "No violence. Ambiguous. MTV-friendly" [sic]. New York magazine felt that MTV's removing the gunshot sounds was not unexpected. Its writer commented, "What does surprise us is that MTV ever considered showing the video at all. We had no idea they still aired music videos, much less ones by talented artists like M.I.A." The Village Voice's Tom Breihan wrote that this censorship undermined the song's implications. He noted this incident was part of a general trend by networks like MTV, BET and radio towards hip hop songs where references to drugs, sex and violence are always removed—a "double standard" applied to hip hop artists that is never applied to songs by mainstream rock bands with similar lyrical overtones. Despite the censorship, the video proved successful on TRL and was the programme's top on-demand video for its 19 August 2008 broadcast. Following the series' final run in September 2008, Slate ranked the video third on their list of the best videos in TRL history, calling it "the only one clever enough to make paranoid puns about blowing up and getting paid". It was also placed at number 56 on BET's Notarized: Top 100 Videos of 2008 countdown.

== Live performances ==
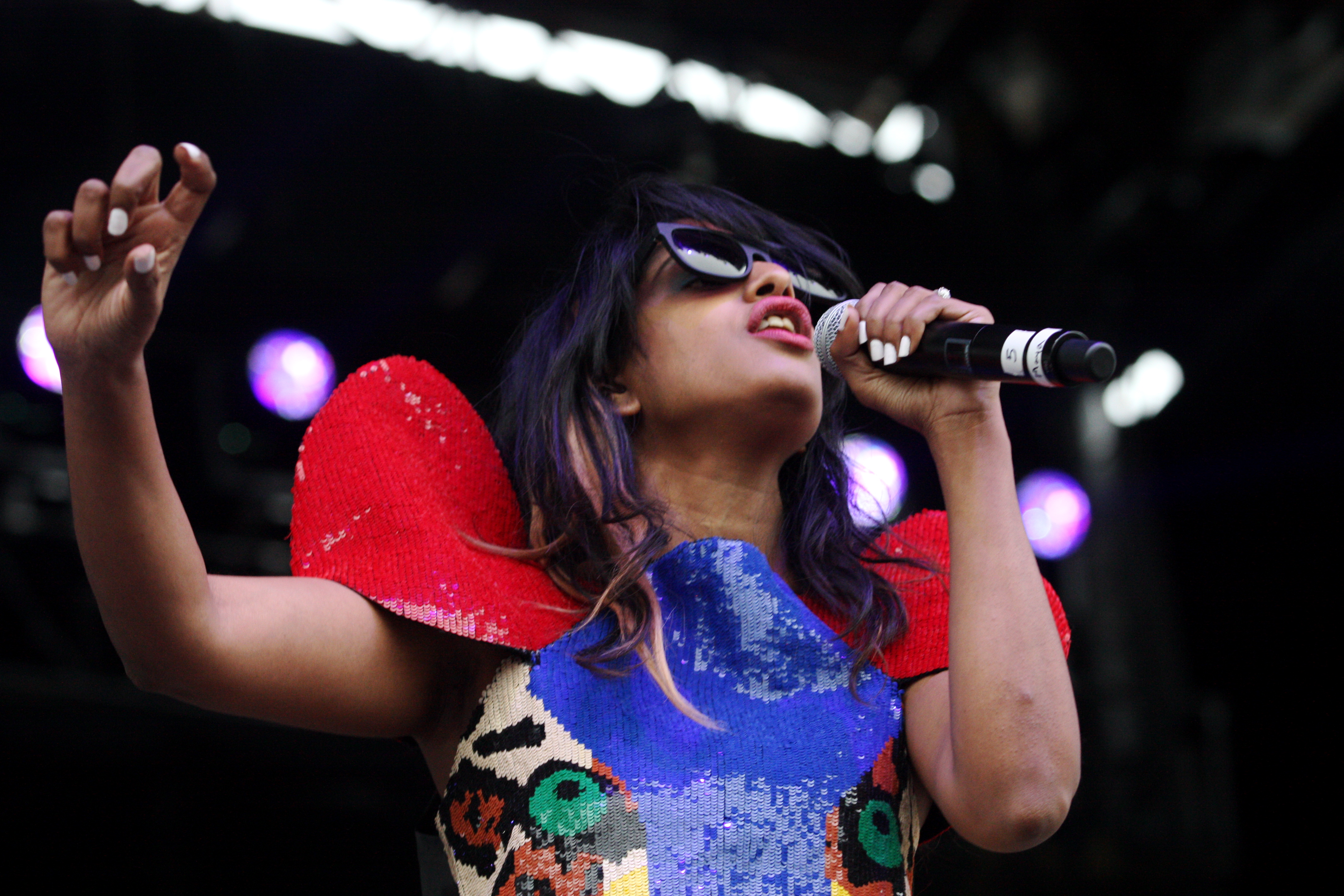
M.I.A. performing at the 2009 Outside Lands Music and Arts Festival

M.I.A. performed "Paper Planes" live on US television for the first time on the CBS talk show Late Show with David Letterman on 13 September 2007. The song's cannabis reference and gunshot sounds were censored. This took M.I.A. aback, and she was visibly surprised because what was broadcast live was different from her soundcheck for the show. She thanked the show's host David Letterman for letting her "into the American mainstream" at the Austin City Limits festival a few days after her Letterman appearance, where she also performed the song. M.I.A. frequently performed "Paper Planes" as the encore song on her Kala Tour, which ran from May to December 2007. She also added the song to the set list of its extension, the People vs. Money Tour, which visited North America during the first half of 2008. As part of the tour, M.I.A. performed at the 2008 Coachella Valley Music and Arts Festival on 26 April. During her performance of "Paper Planes", she called on fans to dance with her on stage resulting in a mass rush to the stage by concertgoers and a standoff with security. Rolling Stone's Jenny Eliscu dubbed M.I.A.'s gig at Coachella "one of this weekend's most buzzed about performances".

Following her gig at the Bonnaroo Music Festival in June 2008, M.I.A. announced that she was going to withdraw from performing live to focus on recording new material. She returned to perform shortly in October 2008, when she sang "Paper Planes" with N.E.R.D. at the Diesel XXX party in Brooklyn. M.I.A. appeared onstage at the 51st Grammy Awards to perform a medley of "Paper Planes" and "Swagga Like Us" (Note: "Swagga Like Us" is a song recorded by American rappers Jay-Z, Kanye West, T.I. and Lil Wayne, and samples the line "No one on the corner had swagger like us" on M.I.A.'s "Paper Planes".) with Jay-Z, Kanye West, T.I. and Lil Wayne on 8 February 2009, when she was nine months pregnant. The five artists received a standing ovation at the ceremony, and M.I.A. was praised in several publications for her energetic performance despite being heavily pregnant. Billboard placed the "Paper Planes" / "Swagga Like Us" medley at number 38 on its list of the 100 Greatest Award Show Performances of All Time in 2017, saying it had, "About as much cool on one stage as the Grammys has ever assembled". At the 2009 Coachella Festival in April, she dedicated the song to photographer Shawn Mortensen, who died the previous week. M.I.A. performed the song as part of her set list at the Outside Lands Music and Arts Festival in August 2009.

== Commercial performance ==
"Paper Planes" was a sleeper hit and M.I.A.'s breakthrough commercial success. It debuted at number 89 on the Canadian Hot 100 chart dated 1 March 2008, peaking at number seven on 27 September 2008 chart, becoming M.I.A.'s only top-ten entry as a lead artist in Canada. The song later received a quadruple platinum certification from Music Canada (MC) for surpassing domestic shipments of 320,000 copies. In the US, the single charted on the Bubbling Under Hot 100 at number four on the chart dated 17 May 2008. After being featured in the popular 2008 films Pineapple Express and Slumdog Millionaire, it received increasing attention in the country, reaching a peak at the number four on the Billboard Hot 100 on 27 September 2008, becoming M.I.A.'s first top-five entry on the chart and her highest-charting single at the time. The song remained her highest peaking single on the chart for twelve years until she debuted atop the chart in 2020. "Paper Planes" remained on the Hot 100 for 20 weeks, having sold 888,000 digital units in the US by August 2008 and surpassing the three million sales mark in August 2009. In June 2010, the single was awarded a triple platinum certification by the Recording Industry Association of America (RIAA), denoting sales of three million units. As of August 2013, "Paper Planes" had sold four million digital copies in the US. In December 2024, the single peaked at number 1 on the TikTok Billboard Top 50 chart after a dance trend on the social media app TikTok went viral.

Across Europe, the single entered the UK Singles Chart at number 69 on 7 September 2008. It peaked at number 19 on 4 October 2008, becoming M.I.A.'s highest-charting single on that chart spending a total of 35 weeks there. It was certified double platinum by the British Phonographic Industry (BPI), signifying sales and streams of 1,200,000 units domestically. "Paper Planes" reached number four in the Czech Republic and entered the top 20 on charts in Belgium's Dutch-speaking area Flanders and Denmark, peaking at number 18 in both territories. The single appeared in the top 40 in Ireland (number 23) and achieved moderate rankings at lower-tier positions in Austria (number 51), the Netherlands (number 57), Australia (number 66), Germany (number 76) and France (number 91). Despite failing to chart in New Zealand, the track was certified 4× Platinum by Recorded Music NZ (RMNZ) for domestic sales exceeding 120,000 copies.

An artist in the underground scene, M.I.A. was happy with the unexpected mainstream success of "Paper Planes", saying, "'Paper Planes' is my underdog song and it's about the underdog and it's when I felt like an underdog, but it's become the biggest song". She did not emphasise the importance of such success, however, opting to "stay an outsider".

== Controversy ==
As a Sri Lankan of Tamil descent, M.I.A. faced political controversies after "Paper Planes" achieved unexpected chart success. In February 2009, Agence France-Presse (AFP) reported that her music was not being played on Sri Lankan radio or television due to government pressure as the Sinhalese–Tamil conflict in Sri Lanka dragged on. (Note: Sri Lanka is a country with a Sinhalese majority (over 74% of the population). The minority Tamils (11% of the population) felt threatened when Sinhalese officials introduced several bills that violated their rights. Conflicts escalated into civil war between the Liberation Tigers of Tamil Eelam (commonly known as the Tamil Tigers) and the Sri Lankan government from 1983 to 2009, killing between 60,000 and 100,000 people, according to the United Nations (UN).) The success of "Paper Planes" paralleled M.I.A.'s condemnation of the Sri Lankan army's atrocities against the Tamils, which she called "systematic genocide" and "ethnic cleansing". This led to criticism and death threats against her. Journalist Touré, writing for The Daily Beast, noted that the atrocities were not widely known because of the Sri Lankan government's regulatory efforts to prevent the international press from spreading the news. Responding to M.I.A.'s apparent support for the Tamil Tigers, who are viewed as a terrorist group by 32 countries including the US, The Guardian's Randeep Ramesh observed "many" Sri Lankan musicians "respect her creativity", but are angry that she was "spreading blatant terrorist propaganda".

Among those who openly criticised M.I.A. was a Sinhalese American rapper named DeLon. In August 2008, he circulated a viral video in which he rapped over "Paper Planes" and accused M.I.A. of supporting terrorism by mockingly using images of the tiger and discussing the violence in her lyrics, showing graphic images of acts purportedly linked to the Tamil militant rebel group. M.I.A responded that her music was "the voice of a civilian refugee" and that she was unwilling to discuss anything with "someone looking for self-promotion". Colombo-based writer Thomas Fuller of The New York Times published an article in February 2009 that tempered M.I.A.'s comments accusing the Sri Lankan government of "genocide", noting the Tamil Tigers are a terrorist group and that the music scene in Sri Lanka had "remained ethnically diverse". Zach Baron of The Village Voice called out Fuller's article for using "chintzy, ad-hominem allegations" to subtly accuse M.I.A. of being a terrorist instead of publicising her efforts to bring aid to war-torn regions where citizens, especially children, lacked access to fundamental healthcare and utilities. M.I.A., commenting on the situation in Sri Lanka to GQ in 2010, said, "Every single Tamil person who's alive today, who's seen how the world does nothing, has to find a way to exist that isn't harboring bitterness and hate and revenge".

== Impact ==
=== Retrospective acclaim and commentary ===
"Paper Planes" has appeared on professional lists of the greatest songs of either the 2000s decade or all time. Entertainment Weekly featured the song on its list of the 100 prominent cultural phenomena of the 2000s decade, published in 2009. VH1 placed "Paper Planes" at number 89 on their Greatest Songs of the 2000s list. The track had prominent showings on decade-end lists by Consequence of Sound (number 16), Stylus Magazine (number 12), Complex (number seven), Rolling Stone (number five), NME (number four), Pitchfork (number three) and Slant Magazine (number two).

In 2009, The Daily Telegraph included "Paper Planes" at number five on their list 100 songs that defined the Noughties. In 2012, Complex ranked the song at number six on its list of the best songs of the last ten years, commemorating the magazine's tenth anniversary. On Rolling Stone's list of the 500 Greatest Songs of All Time, "Paper Planes" placed at number 236 in 2011 and at number 46 in 2021. It ranked second on Rolling Stone's 2018 list of the 100 Greatest Songs of the Century – So Far. NME ranked the track at number 15 on its 2011 list 150 Best Tracks of the Past 15 Years, and at number 53 on its 2014 list the 500 Greatest Songs of All Time. NPR placed the song atop their 2018 list the 200 Greatest Songs By 21st Century Women, commenting that it "solidified [M.I.A.] as a biting analyst willing to use her pop stardom to expose the flaws in the very system of pop stardom itself".

Ben Thomson of The Guardian selected "Paper Planes" as one of "the 50 key events in the history of world and folk music" in 2009. In his article, Thomson observed that the track's combination of hip hop and African folk music elements, which had been generally seen as distinctively opposite genres, helped maintain folk music's relevancy in the age of globalisation. Eric R. Danton of the Hartford Courant noted that the single's success was significant because it defied the manufactured pop music scene by big-name corporations and offered "something to say". In the book In the Limelight and Under the Microscope (2011), Diane Negra, a professor at University College Dublin, and Su Holmes, a reader at University of East Anglia, used "Paper Planes" to examine censorship and discrimination by Western media. The authors regarded the censorship by MTV and CBS as a form of cultural discrimination against a non-white female rapper who was "preaching against assimilation into US capitalistic culture", which exemplifies post-9/11 American perception of "terrorism". They also noted that M.I.A.'s US crossover success "presents an example of how social and cultural hierarchies under threat are negotiated by making contestations in a more implicit way" by challenging conservative American viewpoints on feminism and post-racial society.

=== Cover versions and other usage ===
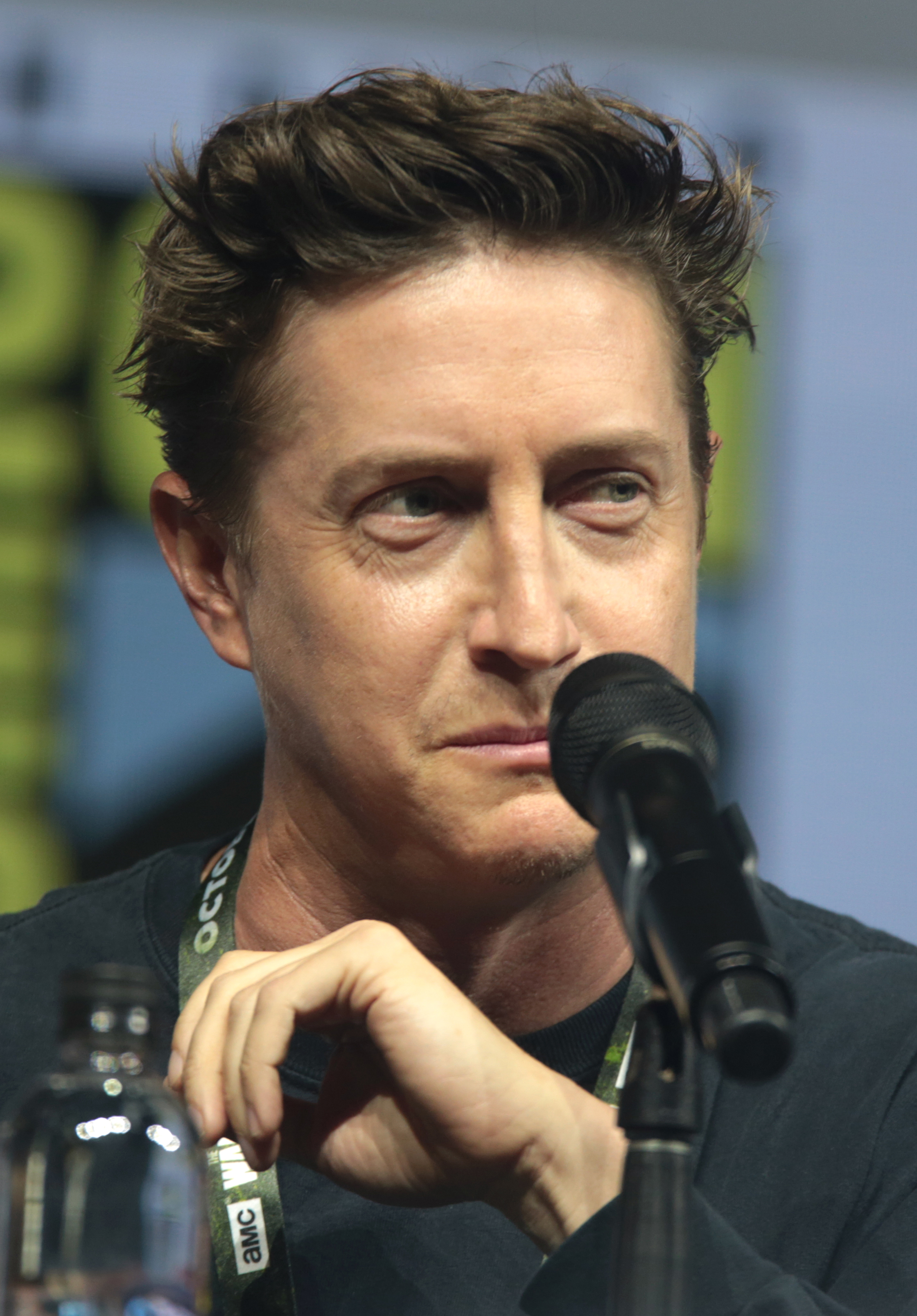
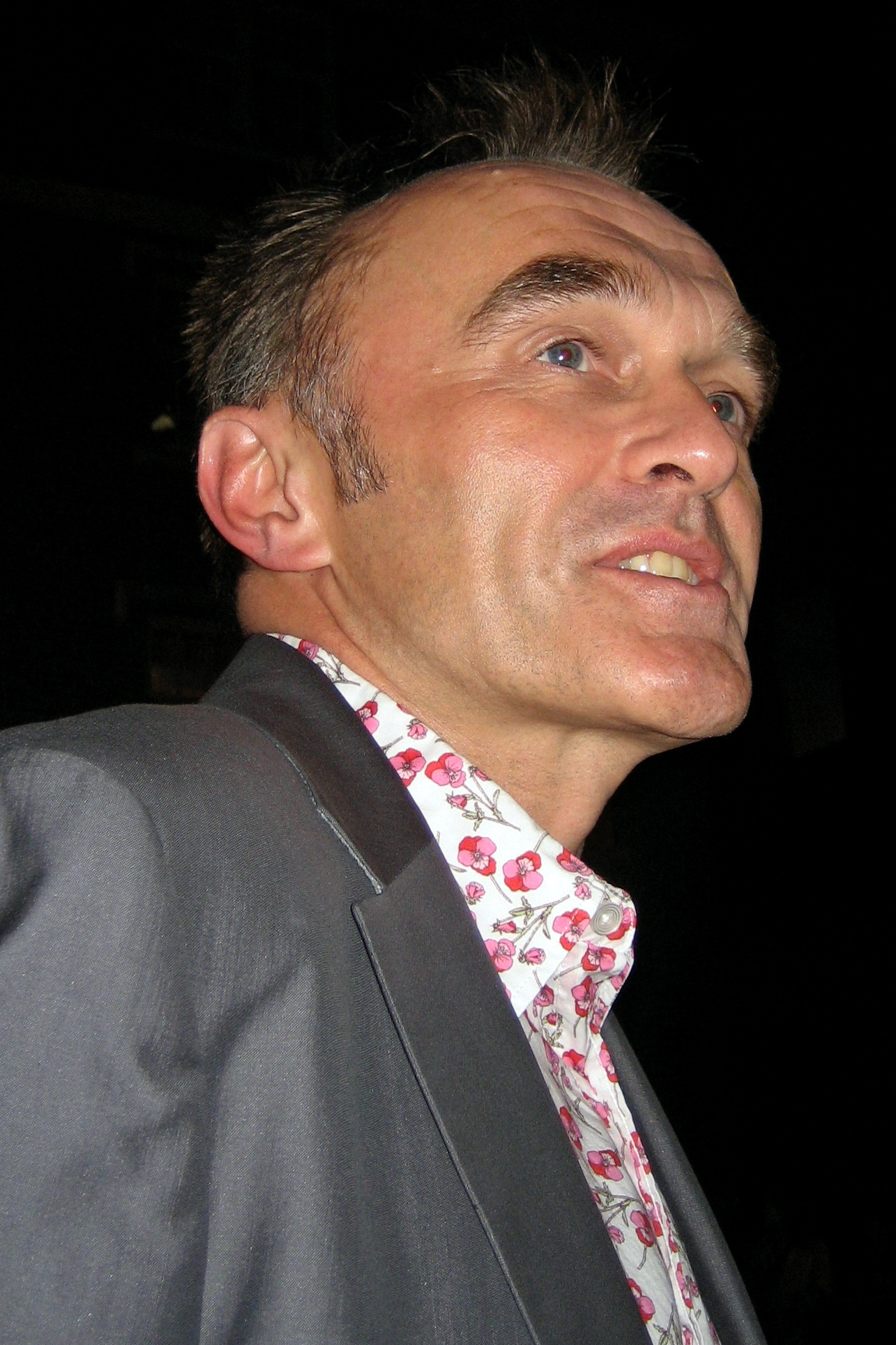
The use of "Paper Planes" in the trailer for Pineapple Express, directed by David Gordon Green (left), and in the film Slumdog Millionaire, directed by Danny Boyle (right), buoyed the single's mainstream success.

Rap rock supergroup Street Sweeper Social Club performed a "rocked out" version of the song many times in concert before recording it for their debut release, The Ghetto Blaster EP (2010). Barbadian singer Rihanna covered "Paper Planes" as part of a medley on several dates of her Good Girl Gone Bad Tour from 2008 to 2009. American indie rock band Built to Spill covered "Paper Planes" at their live concert in Italy in October 2008. English rapper Dizzee Rascal covered the song at his live concerts in the UK in late 2008. London-based indie band the Clientele performed the track live as part of The A.V. Club's A.V. Undercover web series in 2010. English rapper Lowkey featured "Paper Planes" in his 2010 live performances, where he altered the original lyric to "All MPs wanna do is take your money", voicing opposition to the nation's political scene. In February 2026, rapper 1900Rugrat sampled "Paper Planes" in his track "Plane Jane".

The song's lyric "No one on the corner has swagger like us" was sampled in "Swagga Like Us", a song recorded by American rappers T.I., Jay-Z, Kanye West and Lil Wayne, and produced by West, taken from T.I.'s 2008 studio album Paper Trail. Rolling Stone complimented delivery of the four rappers, but felt that the sampling of "Paper Planes" undermined M.I.A.'s creativity. 50 Cent, State Property members Young Chris and Freeway, and Jim Jones released their respective unofficial remixes of the song. M.I.A. was grateful for the song's reception among American hip hop artists, saying: "It's cool when you bring all these rappers and artists like the Clash together. It's cool that they support it ... It's great, especially coming from London".

"Paper Planes" was used in the theatrical trailer for the 2008 stoner comedy Pineapple Express, directed by David Gordon Green, and starring Seth Rogen and James Franco. This catapulted the song to mainstream success in the US. The Los Angeles Times described its incorporation in the trailer as "the most impressive use of M.I.A.'s 'Paper Planes' ever". "Paper Planes" and the DFA remix appear on the soundtrack to Danny Boyle's drama Slumdog Millionaire, released in 2008 after Pineapple Express. Boyle admired M.I.A. and the song before the Pineapple Express trailer, and hailed "Paper Planes" as one of the crucial songs in conveying the film's content. Both Pineapple Express and Slumdog Millionaire proved popular at the box office and buoyed the single's mainstream success. The video game Far Cry 3 (2012) begins with "Paper Planes" used in the opening cinematic sequence. The song was featured on the season 2 premiere of the television series, The Last Man on Earth. Black Dresses' 2017 debut single is a 7-minute long cover of "Paper Planes" on a 3-track EP also featuring Laura Les and 99jakes.

== Track listings and formats ==
Digital single

1. "Paper Planes" – 3:25

UK CD single

1. "Paper Planes" – 3:25
2. "Paper Planes" (Diplo Street Remix feat. Bun B & Rich Boy) – 3:45

Remixes EP

1. "Paper Planes" – 3:25
2. "Paper Planes" (DFA Remix) – 5:52
3. "Paper Planes" (Afrikan Boy & Rye Rye Remix) – 4:02
4. "Paper Planes" (Diplo Street Remix feat. Bun B & Rich Boy) – 3:46
5. "Paper Planes" (Scottie B Remix) – 4:05
6. "Bamboo Banga" (DJ Eli Remix) – 6:25

7-inch single

1. "Paper Planes" – 3:25
2. "Paper Planes" (DFA Remix) – 5:49

US EP

1. "Paper Planes" (featuring Afrikan Boy & Rye Rye) (Blaqstarr remix) – 4:01
2. "Paper Planes" (remix for the children by Ad-Rock) – 3:55
3. "Paper Planes" (featuring Bun B & Rich Boy) (Diplo Street Remix) – 3:45
4. "Paper Planes" (DFA Remix) – 5:49
5. "Paper Planes" (Scottie B Remix) – 4:03

UK EP

1. "Paper Planes" – 3:25
2. "Paper Planes" (DFA Remix) – 5:49
3. "Paper Planes" (Diplo Street Remix) (feat. Bun B & Rich Boy) – 3:45

== Personnel ==
Credits are adapted from "Paper Planes" single liner notes.

- Songwriting – Mathangi Maya "M.I.A." Arulpragasam, Topper Headon, Mick Jones, Wesley "Diplo" Pentz, Paul Simonon, Joe Strummer
- Production – Diplo
- Additional production – Switch
- Mixing – Switch
- Artwork – Mathangi Maya "M.I.A." Arulpragasam

== Charts ==
=== Weekly charts ===
2008–2009 Weekly chart performance for "Paper Planes"
Chart (2008–2009)	Peak position
Australia (ARIA)	66
Austria (Ö3 Austria Top 40)	51
Belgium (Ultratop 50 Flanders)	18
Canada (Canadian Hot 100)	7
Croatia (HRT)	6
Czech Republic Airplay (ČNS IFPI)	4
Denmark (Tracklisten)	18
France (SNEP)	91
Germany (GfK)	76
Ireland (IRMA)	23
Netherlands (Single Top 100)	57
UK Singles (Official Charts Company)	19
UK Indie (Official Charts Company)	1
UK R&B (Official Charts Company)	1
US Billboard Hot 100	4
US Alternative Airplay (Billboard)	12
US Dance Airplay (Billboard)	13
US Hot R&B/Hip-Hop Songs (Billboard)	36
US Hot Rap Songs (Billboard)	6
US Pop Airplay (Billboard)	10
US Rhythmic Airplay (Billboard)	3

2024 Weekly chart performance for "Paper Planes"
Chart (2024)	Peak position
US TikTok Top 50 (Billboard)	1

=== Year-end charts ===
2008 year-end chart performance for "Paper Planes"
Chart (2008)	Position
Canadian Hot 100 (Billboard)	40
UK Singles (OCC)	121
US Billboard Hot 100	35

2009 year-end chart performance for "Paper Planes"
Chart (2009)	Position
UK Singles (OCC)	146

== Certifications ==
Certifications and sales for "Paper Planes"
Region	Certification	Certified units/sales
Canada (Music Canada)	7× Platinum	560,000^{‡}
Denmark (IFPI Danmark)	Gold	45,000^{‡}
Italy (FIMI)	Gold	50,000^{‡}
New Zealand (RMNZ)	5× Platinum	150,000^{‡}
Spain (Promusicae)	Gold	30,000^{‡}
United Kingdom (BPI)	3× Platinum	1,800,000^{‡}
United States (RIAA)	3× Platinum	4,000,000
^{‡} Sales+streaming figures based on certification alone.

== Release history ==
Release dates and formats for "Paper Planes"
Region	Date	Format	Label	Ref.
Europe	11 February 2008	Digital remixes EP	XL	
United States	11 February 2008	12" remixes EP	Interscope	
United States	12 February 2008	Digital remixes EP	Interscope	
United States	11 August 2008	Rhythmic crossover radio	XL; Interscope	
Europe	15 September 2008	Digital download	XL	
United Kingdom	13 October 2008	Digital EP	XL	
United Kingdom	13 October 2008	CD single	XL	
Australia	18 October 2008	CD single	XL	
United States	18 November 2008	7" single	Interscope	

== See also ==
- Paper Plane (cocktail), cocktail named for the song
