= Two turntables and a microphone =

Basic instrumental setup for disc jockeys

"Two turntables and a microphone" is the basic concept of a DJ's equipment. This phrase describes turntables (phonographs) and a microphone connected to a mixer. The DJ uses the mixer's crossfader to fade between two songs playing on the turntables. Fading often includes beatmatching. Live hip hop music also often has an MC rapping into the microphone. In nightclubs the microphone is usually used only for announcements.

Twin turntables were illustrated in the BBC Handbook in 1929, and were advertised for sale in Gramophone magazine in 1931. There was an obvious need for such a setup with 78 rpm records that played for a maximum of five minutes; records could come in a box which contained ten discs or more. Using a pair of turntables was a way to keep the music playing without a break, as can be seen in the 1948 movie The Red Shoes, where two stage hands do a poor job of changing records during a ballet performance in the church hall that housed the Mercury Theatre.

"Two turntables and a microphone" is the title of a 2008 documentary of the life of hip-hop DJ Jam Master Jay (Jason Mizell). The phrase is also featured in the chorus of the song "Where It's At" by Beck.
