= Richard Boulanger =

Richard Charles Boulanger
- Born: November 10, 1956 (age 69); Fall River, Massachusetts, United States
- Genres: Electronic, Computer music
- Occupations: Composer, musician, professor
- Instruments: Synthesizer, guitar, trumpet, radio baton, controllers
- Website: www.csounds.com/boulanger

Richard Charles Boulanger (born November 10, 1956) is a composer, author, and electronic musician. He is a key figure in the development of the audio programming language Csound, and is associated with computer music pioneers Max Mathews and Barry Vercoe.

== Biography ==
=== Education ===
After graduating from Somerset High School in 1974, Boulanger attended New England Conservatory of Music as an undergraduate, where his thesis was a commission by Alan R. Pearlman for the Newton Symphony titled "Three Soundscapes for Two Arp 2600 Synthesizers and Orchestra". After pursuing a Master's in composition from Virginia Commonwealth University, where Allan Blank was amongst his professors, he obtained a PhD in computer music from the University of California, San Diego where he worked at the Center for Music Experiment and Related Research. Boulanger continued his computer music research at Bell Labs, the Center for Computer Research in Music and Acoustics at Stanford University, the Massachusetts Institute of Technology Media Lab, Interval Research, IBM, and One Laptop per Child. In 1989, Boulanger became a Fulbright professor at the Academy of Music in Kraków, Poland.

Boulanger's teachers include Pauline Oliveros, Aaron Copland, and Hugo Norden.

=== Professional life ===
For me, music is a medium through which the inner spiritual essence of all things is revealed and shared. Compositionally, I am interested in extending the voice of the traditional performer through technological means to produce a music which connects with the past, lives in the present and speaks to the future. Educationally, I am interested in helping students see technology as the most powerful instrument for the exploration, discovery, and realization of their essential musical nature – their inner voice.

— Richard Boulanger

Boulanger started studying at the MIT Experimental Music Studion in 1979 with Barry Vercoe, where he also worked with fellow computer musician John Fitch. While working with Vercoe, Boulanger composed the first Csound composition, Trapped in Convert, which was originally written using MUSIC 11, the precursor to Csound. The piece was ported to Csound in 1986. The same year, Boulanger's composition Three Chapters from the Book of Dreams was awarded first prize in the NEWCOMP International Computer Music Competition.

In 1990, Boulanger wrote the first vocal composition using the microtonal Bohlen–Pierce scale, Solemn Song for Evening, which also features a radio baton. His compositions have appeared on albums including iChamber (Centaur Records, 2003: Virtual Encounters) and Electro-Acoustic Music, Vol. 1 (Neuma, 1990: From Temporal Silence), and his interactive orchestral and chamber music compositions have been premiered at the John F. Kennedy Center for the Performing Arts, the Seoul Opera House, and the Beijing Central Conservatory. Boulanger's Radio Baton and PowerGlove Concerto was premiered by the Krakow and Moscow Symphonies.

The Csound-based iOS apps csGrain, csSpectral, and csJam were developed by Boulanger's company Boulanger Labs, which also published MUSE, an app for the Leap Motion controller developed in collaboration with BT. Boulanger later composed a concerto for strings and horns with himself as a MUSE soloist. Boulanger also works with brainwave sensor technology to create "brainwave" music, using interfaces such as NeuroSky's MindWave Mobile EEG Headset.

Boulanger is a published author under the MIT Press, for which he has written and edited two canonical Csound and audio programming textbooks, the latter having been co-edited with Victor Lazzarini.

=== Recent works ===
At Moogfest 2017, Boulanger was part of the Berklee College of Music delegation that presented technology for modular synthesizer ensembles, primarily developed by one of Boulanger's proteges and current Berklee faculty Matthew Davidson. Boulanger additionally presented The Sounds of Dreaming, a multi-episodic electronic music opera written, produced, and performed with Nona Hendryx. The project featured custom performance controller systems involving Max/MSP/Jitter, OSC, live video synthesis, DMX lighting and Arduino instruments developed by Boulanger and his students. A revised version of the opera was presented in August 2017 at the Massachusetts Museum of Contemporary Art in collaboration with performance artist Nick Cave.

Since 1986, Boulanger has taught electronic music at Berklee College of Music, and has previously been on faculty at other collegiate institutions such as New York University and Brown University. He continues to present regularly at audio and music events including Audio Engineering Society conventions and International Csound Conferences, and is an advocate of integrating music technology with music therapy, some of which he has developed with his students. He was a presenter at the Music & Science Symposium organized by Berklee's Music Therapy department in 2013, and at Berklee Electronic Production & Design department's inaugural Voltage Connect Conference in 2017. In October of the same year, Boulanger and Michael Bierylo, chairman of Berklee's Electronic Production & Design department, visited the Shanghai Vocational School of Contemporary Music and attended the 43rd International Computer Music Conference as presenters.

Boulanger's notable students include Elaine Walker, BT, DJ Gomi, Yoon Sang, Marcel Chyrzyński, Tobias Enhus, and Paris Smaragdis.

Boulanger currently resides with his family in Dighton, Massachusetts.

== Publications ==
- Boulanger, Richard, ed. (March 6, 2000). The Csound Book: Perspectives in Software Synthesis, Sound Design, Signal Processing, and Programming. MIT Press. ISBN 978-0262522618.
- Boulanger, Richard; Lazzarini, Victor, eds. (October 22, 2010). The Audio Programming Book. MIT Press. ISBN 978-0262014465.

== Works ==
=== Selected radio baton compositions ===
From the Csounds website:

- From the Shadows, for solo Radio Baton and Violin (1987, revised 2012 with addition of Csound for Live)
- Solemn Songs for Evening (1990), premiered by Maureen Chowning at the International Electronic Music Festival at Bourges, France
- I Know of No Geometry, for solo Radio Baton and Csound5 (1990, revised 2010)
- At Last ... Free for Radio Baton (reworked 1999)

== Bibliography ==
- Boulanger (1986). "Toward a New Age of Performance: Reading the Book of Dreams with the Mathews Electronic Violin", Perspectives of New Music 24, no. 2 (Spring–Summer): 130–155. Errata in 25, nos. 1&2 (Winter–Summer 1987): 655.
- Boulanger, ed. (1999) The Csound Book. ISBN 978-0262522618.
- Boulanger, ed. (2010). The Audio Programming Book. ISBN 978-0262014465.
