= Csound =

Programming language

- Original author: Barry Vercoe
- Developers: John Fitch, Steven Yi, Victor Lazzarini
- Release: 1986; 40 years ago
- Stable release: 7.0.0 / October 21, 2026; 12 days ago
- Written in: C
- Operating system: Cross-platform: Linux, Windows, macOS
- License: LGPL 2.1 or later
- Website: csound.com
- Repository: github.com/csound/csound

Csound is a domain-specific computer programming language for audio programming. It is named Csound because it is written in the language C, in contrast to some of its predecessors. It is free and open-source software, released under the GNU Lesser General Public License (LGPL) 2.1 or later.

== History ==
Csound was originally developed by Barry Vercoe at the MIT Media Lab in 1985, based on his earlier system called Music 11, which in its turn followed the MUSIC-N model initiated by Max Mathews at Bell Labs. Csound development continued throughout the 1990s and 2000s, led by John Fitch at the University of Bath.

Many developers have contributed to Csound, most notably Istvan Varga, Gabriel Maldonado, Robin Whittle, Richard Karpen, Iain McCurdy, Michael Gogins, Matt Ingalls, Steven Yi, Richard Boulanger, Victor Lazzarini and Joachim Heintz. Developed over many years, as of 2024, it has nearly 1,700 unit generators, and it is completely modular and extensible by the user.

Csound is closely related to the underlying language for the Structured Audio extensions to MPEG-4, Structured Audio Orchestra Language (SAOL).

== Csound code ==
Csound takes two specially formatted text files as input. The orchestra describes the nature of the instruments and the score describes notes and other parameters along a timeline. Csound processes the instructions in these files and renders an audio file or real-time audio stream as output.

The orchestra and score files may be unified into a single structured file using markup language tags (a CSD file with filename extension .csd). Here is a very simple example of a unified Csound data file which produces a wave file containing a one-second sine wave tone of 1 kHz at a sample rate of 96 kHz:

<CsoundSynthesizer>
  
  <CsOptions>
    csound -W -d -o tone.wav
  </CsOptions>
  
  <CsInstruments>
    sr     = 96000           ; Sample rate.
    kr     = 9600            ; Control signal rate.
    ksmps  = 10              ; Samples per control signal.
    nchnls = 1               ; Number of output channels.

    instr 1
    a1     oscil p4, p5, 1   ; Oscillator: p4 and p5 are the arguments from the score, 1 is the table number.
    out a1                   ; Output.
    endin
  </CsInstruments>

  <CsScore>
    f1 0 8192 10 1           ; Table containing a sine wave. Built-in generator 10 produces a sum of sinusoids, here only one.
    i1 0 1 20000 1000        ; Play one second of one kHz at amplitude 20000.
    e
  </CsScore>

</CsoundSynthesizer>

As with many other programming languages, writing long programs in Csound can be eased by using an integrated development environment for editing, previewing, testing, and debugging. The one now officially supported is CsoundQt. It has many features, such as automatic code insertion, integrated documentation browser, integrated widgets for graphically controlling parameters in realtime, plus a button for playing the code.

== Csound 5 ==
Version 5.01 was released on March 18, 2006, 20 years after Csound's first release. Csound 5 is available in binary and source code for Linux, Microsoft Windows, and macOS from the SourceForge Csound project. It is much improved and expanded compared to the original software, effectively made into a software library with an application programming interface (API). A variety of frontends have been developed for it. Beyond the basic C API, there are also C++, Java, Python, Lisp, and Tcl, among other bindings, like one from Haskell which allows control of Csound from a purely functional programming environment.

The use of plug-ins allows added abilities without modifying the Csound code, as there is the possibility to write user-defined opcodes as extensions to the original language. Linux Audio Developer's Simple Plugin API (LADSPA) and Disposable Soft Synth Interface (DSSI) are supported, but Virtual Studio Technology (VST) support has been removed.

In the 1990s was added real-time performance via Musical Instrument Digital Interface (MIDI), and support of Fast Light Toolkit (FLTK) widgets (graphical user interface components with sliders, knobs, etc.) to control real-time audio, and integrating custom graphical interfaces written in Python.

== Csound 6 ==
The development of Csound 6 was led by John Fitch, Steven Yi and Victor Lazzarini. After its features were hashed out at the Csound Conference held in 2011 in Hanover, Csound 6 was released in July 2013 and made available on GitHub. Csound 6 is also available for Android. The major new features of Csound 6 include:

- A bison/flex based parser for the Csound language is now standard. It generates an abstract syntax tree that is accessible via the Csound API. The tree can then be compiled to a Csound performance runtime using the API. Therefore, after the tree has been compiled, it can be manipulated by user code before compiling it to a Csound performance runtime. Alternatively, the user could create the entire abstract syntax tree from another language, then compile the tree to a Csound performance runtime.
- There is a new built-in multi-dimensional array type. Arrays can be passed to instruments and opcodes. Arithmetic may be performed directly on arrays.
- There is a new type system that enables user-defined types to be used in the Csound language.
- The orchestra can be re-compiled at any time, or individual instruments can be compiled at any time, during a running performance. This enables true "live coding" in Csound performances.
- The Csound API has been rationalized and simplified.
- Csound can take advantage of any number of CPUs for concurrent processing during performance. This occurs without any changes to Csound code. This produces substantial speedups of most Csound processing. For example, a piece that renders in 100 seconds with 1 core should render in about 50 seconds with 4 cores.
- Csound can compile orchestras and scores directly from strings of text, enabling the use of Csound in environments where writing to the file system is not permitted.
- Score events such as notes can be scheduled to sample accurate times, even if synthesis is processed in blocks of samples.
- All opcodes that return a single value may be used as functions in the orchestra language.
- Audio analysis file formats can be byte-order independent.
- A single score statement can contain multiple string parameters.
- Most oscillator opcodes will use an internal sine function table if the table number is omitted.
- Command-line options can be set programmatically using the Csound API.
- Numerous duplicate areas of code within Csound have been rationalized.
- An Android app was built which provides user-defined graphical user interfaces and JavaScript-based algorithmic composition using HTML5.

== Csound for live performance ==
Currently only Csound score or note events can be generated in real time (in contrast to instruments, which are only definable at compile time, when csound first starts; in Csound 6 this limit is removed). The set of sound processors is defined and compiled at load time, but the individual processing objects can be spawned or destroyed in real time, input audio processed in real time, and output generated also in real time. Note events can be triggered based on OSC communications within an instrument instance, spawned by MIDI, or entered to stdin (by typing into a terminal or sending textual statements from another program). The use of Csound 5 as a live performance tool can be augmented with a variety of third-party software. Live Event Sheet within CsoundQt can be used to modify the score in real-time. In addition, interfaces to other programming languages can be used to script Csound. A paper detailing the use of Csound with Qt or Pure Data in real-time musical synthesis was presented at the 2012 Linux Audio Conference The Ounk project attempts to integrate Python with Csound while CsoundAC provides a way to do algorithmic composition from Python using Csound as backend. Audivation's Csound for Live packages various opcodes into Max/MSP wrappers suitable for use in Ableton Live. Csound is also available for mobile systems (iOS, Android).

== One Laptop per Child (OLPC) ==
Csound5 was chosen to be the audio/music development system for the One Laptop per Child (OLPC) project on the XO-1 Laptop platform.

== See also ==
- Audio signal processing
- Software synthesizer
- Computer music
- Comparison of audio synthesis environments
- List of music software
