= James H. Davenport =

British computer scientist

James Davenport TD CMath CITP FBCS FIMA
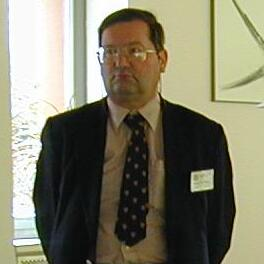
- James Davenport in 2001
- Born: James Harold Davenport; 26 September 1953 (age 73)
- Education: Marlborough College; University of Cambridge (BA, PhD)
- Awards: National Teaching Fellowship (2014)
- Scientific career
- Fields: Cryptography; Computer algebra systems
- Workplaces: University of Bath; British Army
- Thesis: On the integration of algebraic functions (1979)
- Doctoral advisor: John ffitch Arthur Norman
- Website: people.bath.ac.uk/masjhd

James Harold Davenport (born 26 September 1953) is a British computer scientist who works in computer algebra. Having done his PhD and early research at the Computer Laboratory, University of Cambridge, he is the Hebron and Medlock Professor of Information Technology at the University of Bath in Bath, England.

== Education and early life ==
Davenport was privately educated at Marlborough College. In 1969, the team that developed the automated teller machine in the United Kingdom at IBM Hursley used parts from that project to build an IBM School Computer. It was a community outreach project, and it went on tour. When it came to Marlborough College, Davenport, aged 16, discovered that, although it was ostensibly a six-digit computer, the microcode had access to a 12-digit internal register to do multiply/divide. He used this to implement Draim's algorithm from his father Harold Davenport's book, The Higher Arithmetic, and tested eight-digit numbers for primality.

Between school and university, Davenport worked in a government laboratory for nine months, writing and using multiword arithmetic, but also using number theory to solve a problem in hashing, which was published.

After Marlborough, Davenport went to study at the University of Cambridge where he was a student at Trinity College, Cambridge. He was awarded a Bachelor of Arts degree in 1974, which was converted to a Master of Arts degree in 1978, and a Master of Mathematics in 2011. He was awarded a PhD in 1980.

== Career and research ==
Davenport was at IBM Yorktown Heights for a year, and returned to Cambridge as a Research Fellow. He went to Grenoble for a year, before taking a post at the University of Bath in 1983.

Davenport is an author of a textbook about computer algebra and of many papers. He has been Project Chair of the European OpenMath Project and its successor Thematic Network, with responsibilities for aligning OpenMath and MathML, producing Content Dictionaries and supervised a Reduce-based OpenMath/MathML translator, and was Treasurer of the European Mathematical Trust. He was Founding Editor-in-Chief of the London Mathematical Society's Journal of Computation and Mathematics.

During Davenport's time in the British army, he once planned the defence of a bridge on exercise in West Germany. Commonly, he has used this as a life lesson to his students, explaining that they must analyse problems from the perspective of an attacker.

=== Awards and honours ===
Davenport was awarded the Honorary Degree of Doctor of Science in September 2019 by the West University of Timişoara, Romania. This was in recognition of his pioneering and ongoing work in computer algebra systems and theory of symbolic computation.

In 2014, Davenport was awarded a National Teaching Fellowship by the Higher Education Academy.

He was awarded the Bronze Medal of the University of Helsinki in 2001.

From January to June 2017 Davenport was a Fulbright CyberSecurity Scholar at New York University, and maintained a blog over the same period.

In 2024, he was awarded Honorary Fellowship of BCS, The Chartered Institute for IT after many years service, including as a Vice-President.

== Personal life ==
Davenport is the son of the mathematician Harold Davenport.
