= Smaragdis =

Smaragdis is a Greek surname. Notable people with the surname include:

- Nikolaos Smaragdis (born 1982), Greek volleyball player
- Paris Smaragdis, American engineer
- Yannis Smaragdis (born 1946), Greek filmmaker

== See also ==
- Smaragdus (name)
