= Elaine Walker (composer) =

American composer

Elaine Walker is a composer, electronic musician and author. She has published mathematics papers and written a physics/philosophy book, Matter over mind: cosmos, chaos, and curiosity (2016). She specializes in microtonal music, including founding ZIA, an all-electronic band, and performing with D.D.T.. She describes: "I compose microtonal music strictly by ear and leave it to others to analyze, so you won't find ratios or mathematics here."

== Life ==
Raised in southern New Mexico "by two loving mathematicians", her parents were professors Elbert A. Walker and Carol L. Walker.

Walker has a Music Synthesis Production degree from Berklee College of Music (1991) and a master's degree in Music Technology from New York University (2001). In her master's thesis, she developed a new kind of music compositional theory called "Chaos Melody Theory" based on recursive chaos mathematics. She was a music editor for Pokémon with 4Kids Entertainment, and later GoGoRiki.

Walker is a long-time space advocate and has served as Education and Public Outreach Coordinator for the Haughton–Mars Project in the Arctic. Her video for Martians was recorded there in 2003 (commissioned by NASA) to promote the prospect of humans living on Mars.

== Work ==
=== ZIA ===
In 1991, Walker formed the band ZIA, an American electronic industrial rock band based out of Boston and named after the Zia sun symbol featured in the Flag of New Mexico. In the early years ZIA performed with Emergency Broadcast Network, A Flock of Seagulls, and Marilyn Manson in the Boston area.

ZIA released five albums: Zia v1.5 (1992), Big Bang! (2000), SHEM (1996), Martians (2005) and Drum 'n' Space (2011).

After graduating from Berklee in 1991, Walker composed her first music for ZIA and also joined the industrial band D.D.T., adding microtonal synths. The first ZIA show in 1992 included the other D.D.T. band members, which began the tradition of borrowing musicians from other bands for ZIA shows. Fifth Colvmn Records released the EP Shem in 1996, and the composition "Space-Time" was released on the label's Echo compilation.

=== Solo work ===
Walker had already released her debut studio album titled Blue Cartoon in 1989, before founding ZIA. Her four solo releases between 1999 and 2001 were created for the pro-space community, some of which she performed at space conventions for National Space Society, Space Access Society, Space Frontier Foundation, and Mars Society.

Walker returned to solo work in 2018 and self-released three microtonal studio albums, Four-Momentum (2018), No Terrestrial Road (2020), and Macrochip (2026), a mini-movie album composed fully in the Bohlen-Pierce scale.

=== Composition ===
Walker has composed using various equal temperaments, including the Bohlen–Pierce scale: Stick Men (1991), Agribusiness (1992), Love Song (2010), Greater Good (2011), and songs on her solo albums, including the 2018 Magic Rectangle, Infinity, Four-Momentum, Euler's Identity; Involution (2020); and the full-length Bohlen-Pierce scale mini-movie album Macrochip (2026). Other tunings used by Walker include 10, 11, 14, 15, 16, 17, 19 and 20 equal temperament.

Walker's music since 1992 includes many space or alien themed titles, culminating in her mini-movie album Macrochip (2026). She composed the theme to Yuri's Night.

=== Physics and philosophy ===
Walker is the author of the well-received book Matter Over Mind: Cosmos, Chaos and Curiosity (2016; 2nd edition, 2020), "a panoramic account of the cosmos [that] infers political and moral lessons for the whole of humanity."

=== Mathematics ===
Walker has coauthored research articles in mathematics on topics related to the square peg problem, conic geometry and line arrangements.

== Discography ==
As ZIA

Studio albums

- Zia v1.5 (1992)
- SHEM (1996, Fifth Colvmn Records)
- Big Bang! (2000, Zia/Chaos Control)
- Martians (2005)
- Drum 'n' Space (2011)

=== As Elaine Walker ===
Studio albums

- Schizoid Aria (1986)
- Blue Cartoon (1989)
- Frontier Creatures (1999)
- Mars (2000)
- Space Elevator Music (2001)
- Hiten (2001), music by Elaine Walker, lyrics by Keith Gottschalk, and art by Ed Belbruno
- Four-Momentum (2018)
- No Terrestrial Road (2020)
- Macrochip (2026)

=== Compilation appearances ===
- Shut Up Kitty (1993, Re-Constriction Records)
- Echo (1996, Fifth Colvmn)
- Boston Elektro 101 (1996, Sinless)
- Mind/Body Compilation Volume 3 (1996, Atomic Novelties/DIY)
- Musical Sampler 1998 (1998, Deus ex Musica)
- Movement 1998 (1998, Deus ex Musica)
- Shades of Grey (1998, Grinding Into Emptiness)
- She: A Female Trip-Hop Experience (2001, Sonic Images Electronica)
- Mircotona DVD (2016)
- Next Xen (2016), split-notes.com, 6 February 2016, retrieved June 28, 2026.

== See also ==
- Fifth Colvmn Records
- Richard Boulanger
- Space advocacy
