= Victor Lazzarini =

Brazilian musician (born 1969)

Victor Lazzarini (born 1969) is a Brazilian-Irish composer and computer music researcher. Born in Londrina, Brazil, he studied music in the local conservatory and completed his B.Mus. (Composition) at the State University of Campinas (UNICAMP). He received a doctorate from the University of Nottingham in 1996. Since 1998, he has been working at Maynooth University, where he is currently a Professor of Music and Dean of Arts, Celtic Studies and Philosophy.

Lazzarini is one of the leading developers of Csound along with John Fitch and Steven Yi, and the author of the Sound Object (SndObj) Library. Lazzarini has contributed a number of new sound synthesis techniques such as Modified FM Synthesis, Vector Phase Shaping, Feedback AM, and Adaptive Frequency Modulation. He is the co-editor, with Richard Boulanger, of the Audio Programming Book.

Lazzarini has composed music for films, as well as electronic and instrumental works. He was the winner of the AIC/IMRO Mostly Modern International Composer's Competition in Ireland and the Hallward Composition Prize in the UK.
