= Moldover =

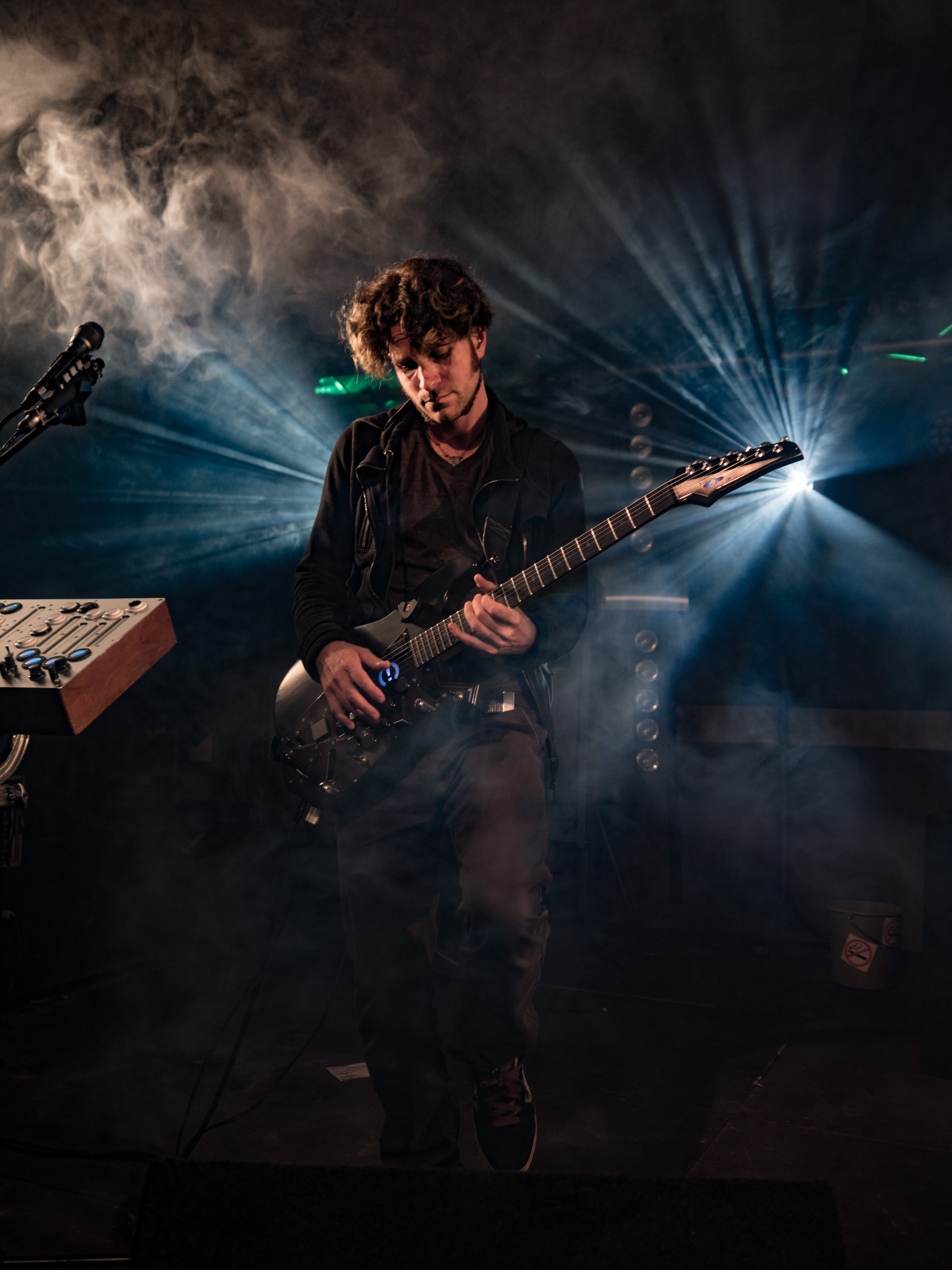
- Moldover performing at SHA2017 Hacker Camp in the Netherlands

Background information
- Also known as: Moldover
- Born: Matthew Moldover; April 24, 1980 (age 46)
- Origin: Rockville MD, United States
- Genres: Rock, metal, blues, electronica, breakbeat, drum and bass, plunderphonics, breakcore
- Occupations: Singer-songwriter, technologist, instrument designer, musician, producer
- Instruments: Mojo, Robocaster, Guitar, vocals, sampler
- Years active: 1998 – present
- Label: Duct Tape Records
- Website: www.moldover.com

Matthew Moldover (born April 24, 1980), known as Moldover, is a musician and instrument designer based in San Francisco, CA. He is known for his musical instruments, including the Mojo, Robocaster, Octamasher and Guitar Wing.

== Early life ==
Moldover is originally from the Washington, D.C. area and began playing guitar at the age of 13 in Rockville, MD. He discovered Berklee College of Music on the internet and moved to Boston to attend in 1998.

He earned a degree in electronic music composition in 2002, and then moved to New York City to play in a variety of bands. He soon transitioned to a focus on solo performance; a 2003 visit to Burning Man Festival in Nevada led to him moving to San Francisco in 2008.

== Career ==
Moldover has released a significant amount of media content in different arenas including 4 studio albums of music, many live videos of his performance known as "Live Remashing" and also instructional videos for Ask Video and others.

Before releasing an official Studio album, Moldover released a series of live recordings called Live Remashing. These were his preliminary journeys into Controllerism before he had come up with the term. In 2006, Marc Urselli of Chain D.L.K. described Live Remashing as "an encyclopedia of modern pop culture in sound format" and "the best example of how to use modern technologies to enhance and extend musicianship and artistic vision", and "the new form of DJing."

In 2009, Moldover released his debut album Moldover. Of the variety of price tiers for the release of the album, the steepest version included a fully playable circuit board, thus highlighting what is termed playable packaging. The track listings themselves were created using circuitry. Inside the package is a small playable light-theremin.

In 2016, Moldover released the studio album 4 Track which included the playable packaging Voice Crusher.

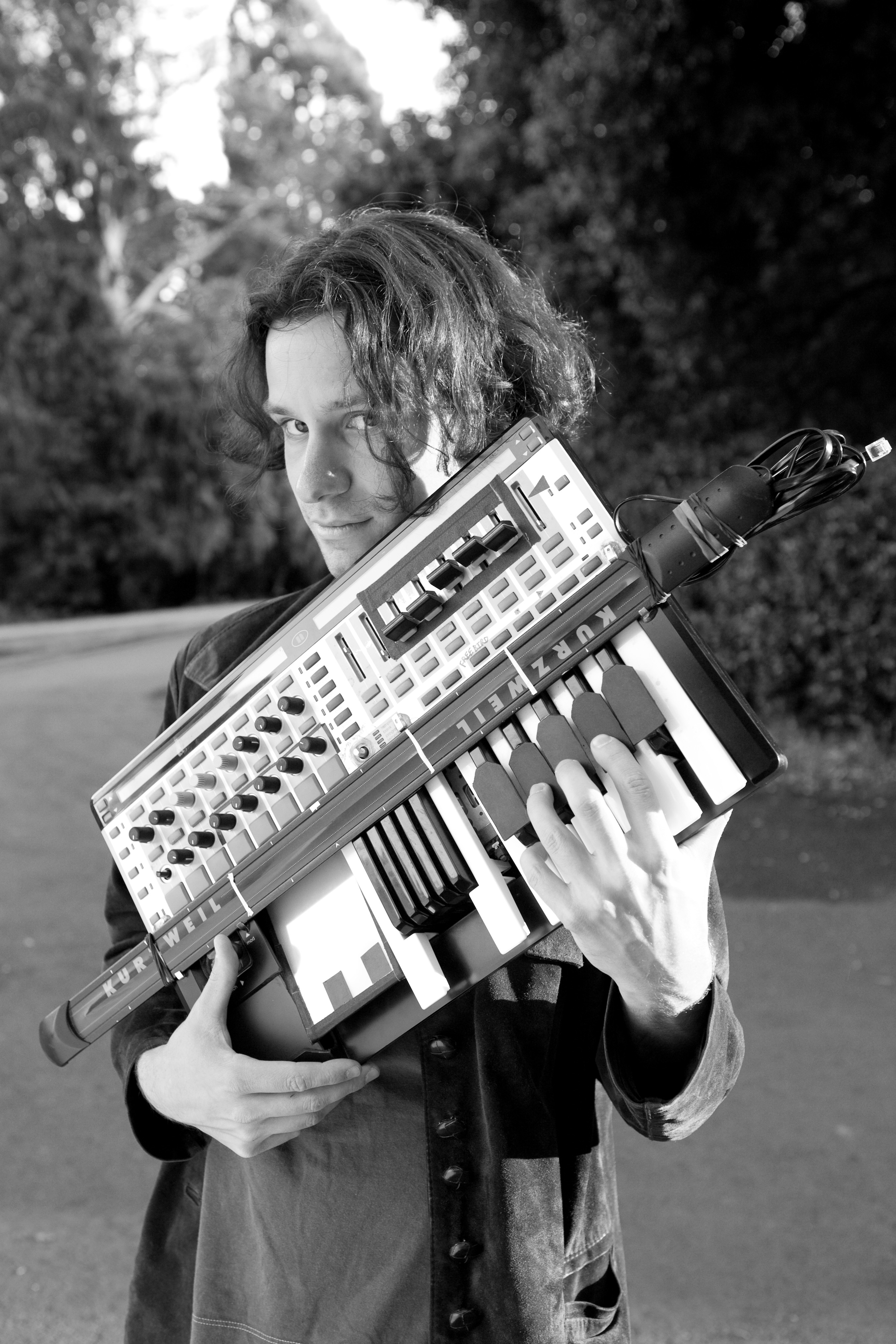
Featuring Moldover's hacked controller, "The Frankentroller"

== Controllerism ==
The MIDI Manufacturers Association has referred to him as the "Godfather of Controllerism".

Moldover suggests that the Controller is "the instrument of the next generation." In 2005, he coined the term Controllerism with the encouragement of his manager of the time, DJ Shakey. On the development of Controllerism he said that "the basic styles of DJing weren't satisfying to me, I was used to a more visceral way of performing; playing guitar, singing, and producing sound with my body in real time. For me, controllerism is more along those lines than DJing."

Controllerism is the art of manipulating sound and creating music live, using computer controllers and software.

In a 2007 article in Remix, Moldover stated that "Controllerism borrows its name from turntablism. These terms are essentially the same idea, but they revolve around different instruments."

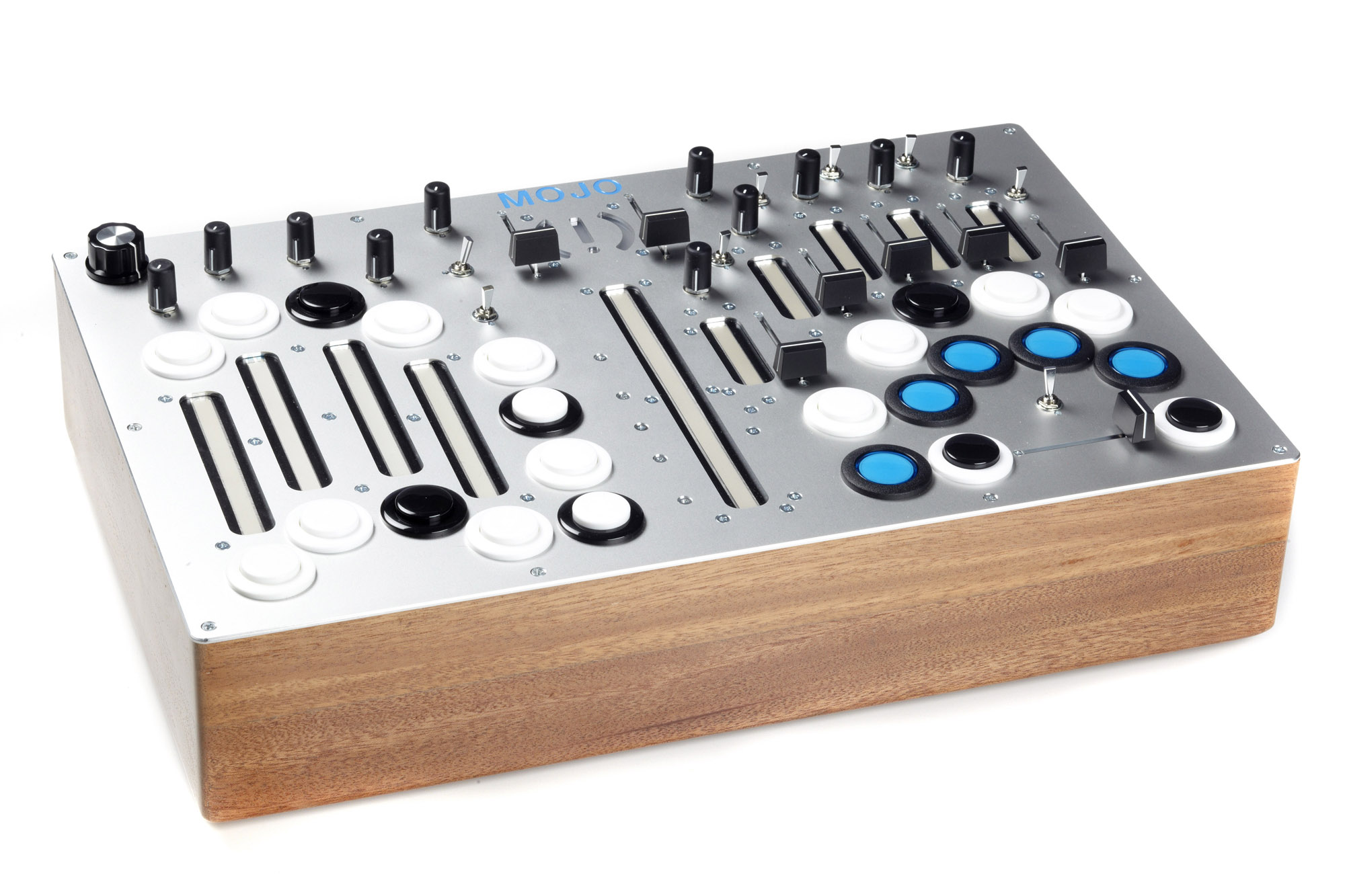
THE MOJO : Moldover's custom MIDI controller, made together with 60 Works Controllers

== Instrument design ==
=== Frankentroller ===
The Frankentroller started as a Novation Remote 25 SL Keyboard; Moldover adapted its hardware to make it a new instrument by adding a Kurzweil keyboard touchstrip, a Korg Kaoss Pad, as well as refashioning some of the keyboards black keys to be used as crossfaders. Ean Golden of Remix subsequently stated that the Frankentroller had earned Moldover wins his personal award for "most creative mod."

=== Mojo ===
In 2010, Moldover released the MOJO, "Limited-Edition Performance MIDI Controller". This is his first "made from scratch" midi controller. It figures prominently in his live performances. In 2012, Moldover made the design for the Mojo open source. Artist Ill Gates called the Mojo, "the single greatest controller in the history of MIDI."

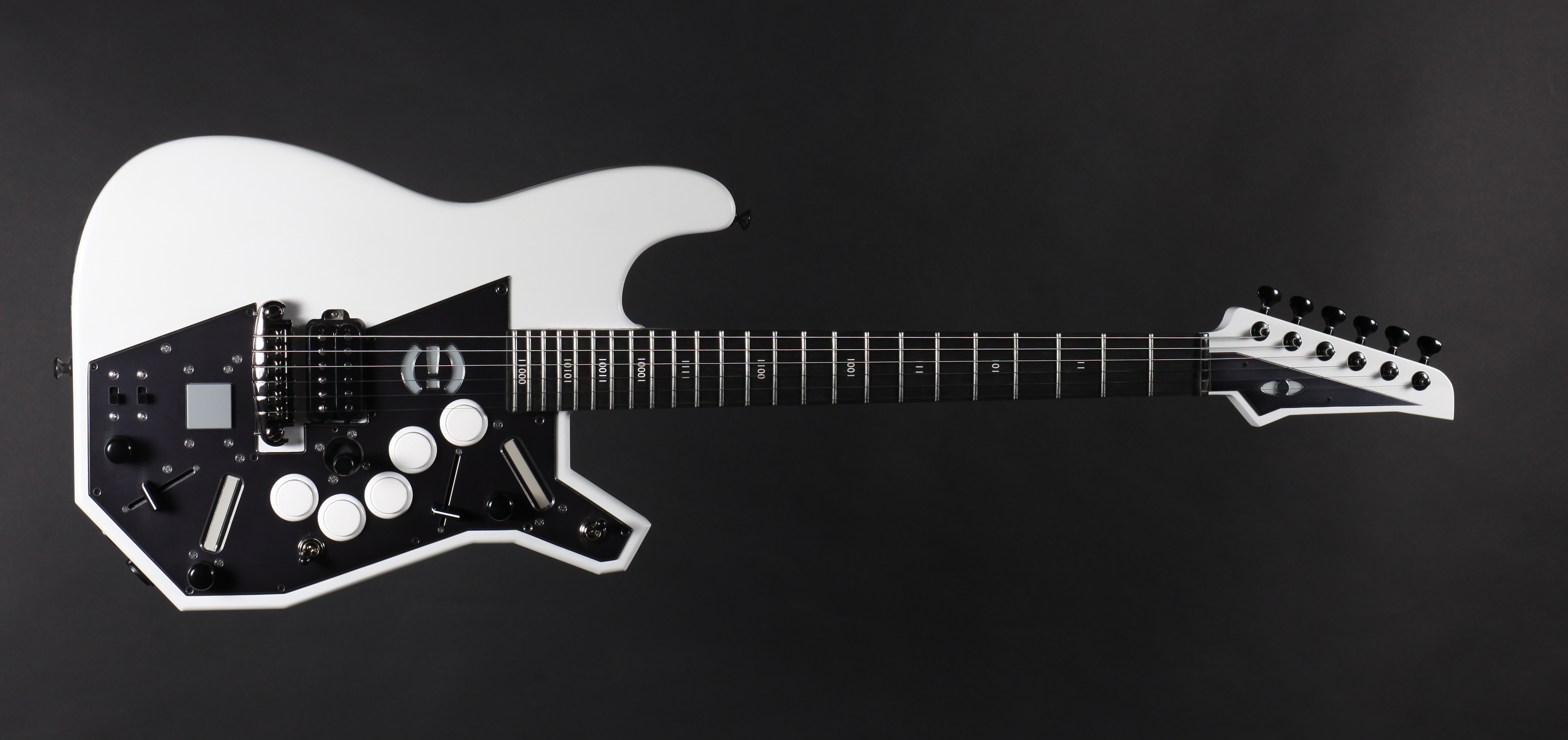
THE ROBOCASTER : Moldover's custom controller guitar, made together with Visionary Instruments

=== Robocaster ===
The Robocaster is a custom-made signature guitar produced by Visionary Instruments: a "hybrid instrument", it incorporates several MIDI controller options, including "gaming buttons, touch-strips, knobs, faders, switches, motion sensors, a pressure pad and a joystick."

Moldover said that he wanted to create the Robocaster as a more tactile and less sample-based instrument that allows for more traditional musicianship combined with advanced FX tweaking and midi integration.

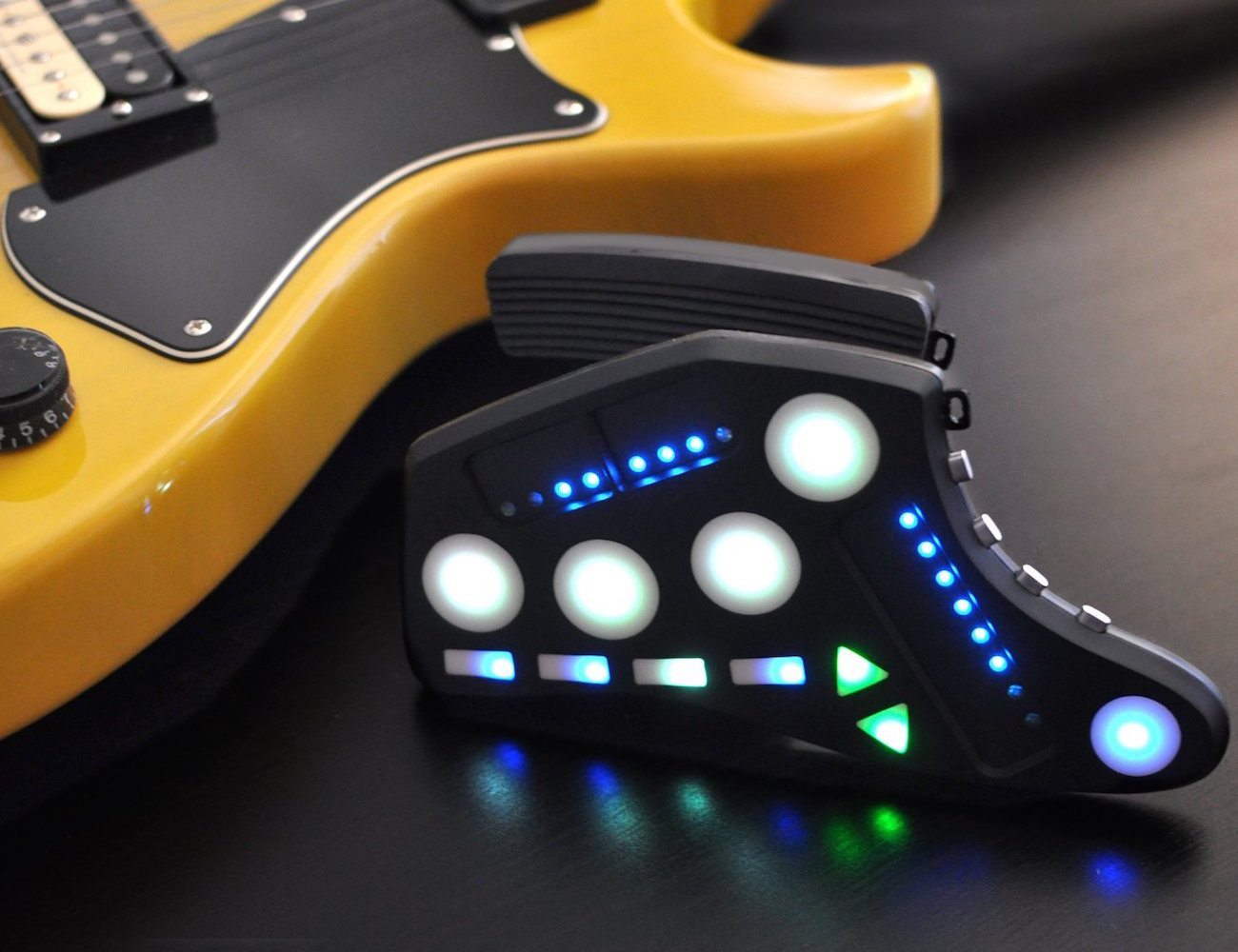
THE GUITAR WING : Designed by Moldover and Livid Instruments

=== Guitar Wing ===
Directly inspired by the Robocaster, the Guitar Wing adds an ergonomic, wireless MIDI controller to any electric guitar or bass. The Guitar Wing was created in collaboration with Livid Instruments. Popular Science noted that it allows "near effortless control over effects, software, digital audio workstations and even stage lights between strums."

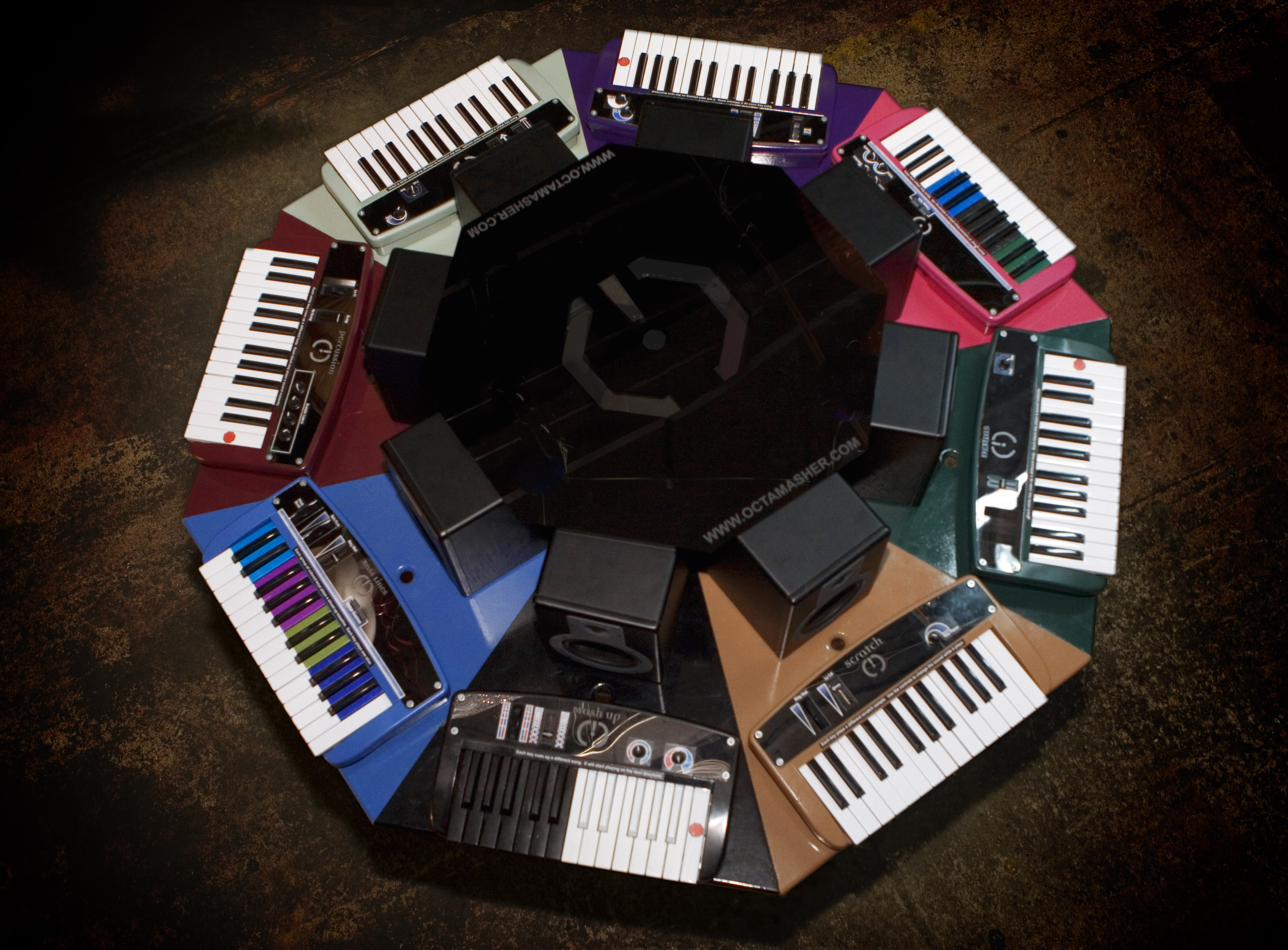
Moldover's first jambox, born in 2005

=== Octamasher Jambox ===
Originally designed as a gift for Burning Man participants, the Octamasher is "a multi-input combination of 8 modified keyboards that link to a single brain (computer), the output of which is coordinated and controlled to allow for multiple users combining to perform new music."

== Discography ==
=== Studio albums ===
- Moldover (2009)
- Say It - Remix EP (2014)
- Four Track (2016)

=== Live Controllerism Mixes ===
- Live Remashing (Live Controllerism Mix 6/20, 11/6 & 11/9 2004)
- Live at Warper (Live Controllerism Mix 2/21/2006)
- Live at BassWerks LA (Live Controllerism Mix 1/17/2008)
- Friendly Fire (Mixtape 2018)

== Videography ==
=== Demonstration Videos ===
- Moldover, Live Remashing Demonstration (2006)
- Moldover's Octamasher (2006)
- Moldover's Approach to Controllerism (2007)
- MTV's The How-To Show - Moldover (2008)
- Moldover's Album - Circuit Board Instrument (2009)
- The Mojo: Moldover's New Controller (Sneak Peak) (2010)
- Moldover's Scene TOAST on iPhone (2011)
- TRAKTOR KONTROL F1 - Controllerism with Moldover | Native Instruments (2012)
- How to Build a Controller (Making of the Mojo) (2012)
- Moldover's Jamboxes (2012)
- ASK VIDEO COURSE: Moldover : Sound Control (2013)
- Moldover's Four Track Documentary (2013)
- The Robocaster and the Guitar Wing - Moldover Interview (2015)
- ASK VIDEO COURSE : Making Music With Game Controllers (2017)

=== Music videos ===
- Young One (2012)
- Say It (2012)
- Not Your Mirror (2016)

=== Live Performance Videos ===
- Moldover - Live at Warper 7/26/2006 (2006)
- Moldover - Live at BassWerks LA 1/18/2008 (2008)
- Moldover - Live at Future Everything 5/14/10 (2011)
- Controller Battle - MOLDOVER (Special Exhibition) (2011)
- Novation//Twitch DJ Controller Mash-up by Moldover (2012)
- Moldover - Not Your Mirror (2012)
- Moldover and the Guitar Wing (2014)
- Moldover - Alone (2015)
- Moldover - Plastic Smile (2017)
- Moldover - Live at Bottom of the Hill 12/16/17 (2018)

== Instruments ==
=== Instrument Design & System Architect ===
- The Mojo - A hyper-ergonomic performance controller for 60-Works (2010)
- The Bass Finger - An ultra-rugged DJ controller for artist Bassnectar (2012)
- The Robocaster - A controller-guitar hybrid for Visionary Instruments (2013)
- Guitar Wing - A guitar-attaching control surface for Livid Instruments (2014)
- RAMU - A multitude of hardware and software instruments collaboratively created for Mickey Hart (The Grateful Dead/Dead & Co.) (2016–2019)
- Arcadia - Combination keyboard and finger drumming controller for artist Glasys (2018)
- The MC1 - A microphone-attaching controller for personal performances (2019)

=== Multiplayer Instrument Design ("Jamboxes") ===
- The Octamasher - For casual interaction at festivals and parties (2005)
- The Syncomasher - For performances by professional controllerists (2009)
- The Minimasher - For young people and people with disabilities (2010)
- ConnecTable - Iterative modular platform for productizing the jambox (2013)
- 8 Bit Boombox - Retro gaming and chiptune themed portable jambox (2018)

=== Casual Playable Packaging instruments ===
- Light Theremin CD-case (2008)
- Voice Crusher USB-drive in cassette form-factor (2014)
- Do-It-Yourself kit version of Light Theremin (2012) and Voice Crusher (2018)
