= Alan Mycroft =

Computer scientist

- Education: University of Cambridge (BA, MA, ScD); University of Edinburgh (PhD)
- Known for: Norcroft C compiler; Raspberry Pi Foundation
- Children: 4
- Scientific career
- Fields: Programming languages; Compilation; Static Analysis
- Workplaces: University of Cambridge; Computer Laboratory; Raspberry Pi Foundation
- Thesis: Abstract interpretation and optimising transformations for applicative programs (1982)
- Doctoral advisor: Rod Burstall; Robin Milner
- Website: www.cl.cam.ac.uk/~am21/

Alan Mycroft is an emeritus professor at the Computer Laboratory, University of Cambridge and a fellow of Robinson College, Cambridge, where he used to serve as director of studies for computer science.

== Education ==
Mycroft read mathematics at Cambridge then moved to Edinburgh where he completed his Doctor of Philosophy degree with a thesis on Abstract interpretation and optimising transformations for applicative programs supervised by Rod Burstall and Robin Milner.

== Research ==
Mycroft's research interests are in programming languages, software engineering and algorithms.

With Arthur Norman, he co-created the Norcroft C compiler. He is also a named trustee of the Raspberry Pi Foundation, a charitable organisation whose single-board computer is intended to stimulate the teaching of basic computer science in schools.

== Personal life ==
Mycroft has four children.
