= Barry Vercoe =

American computer scientist (1937–2025)

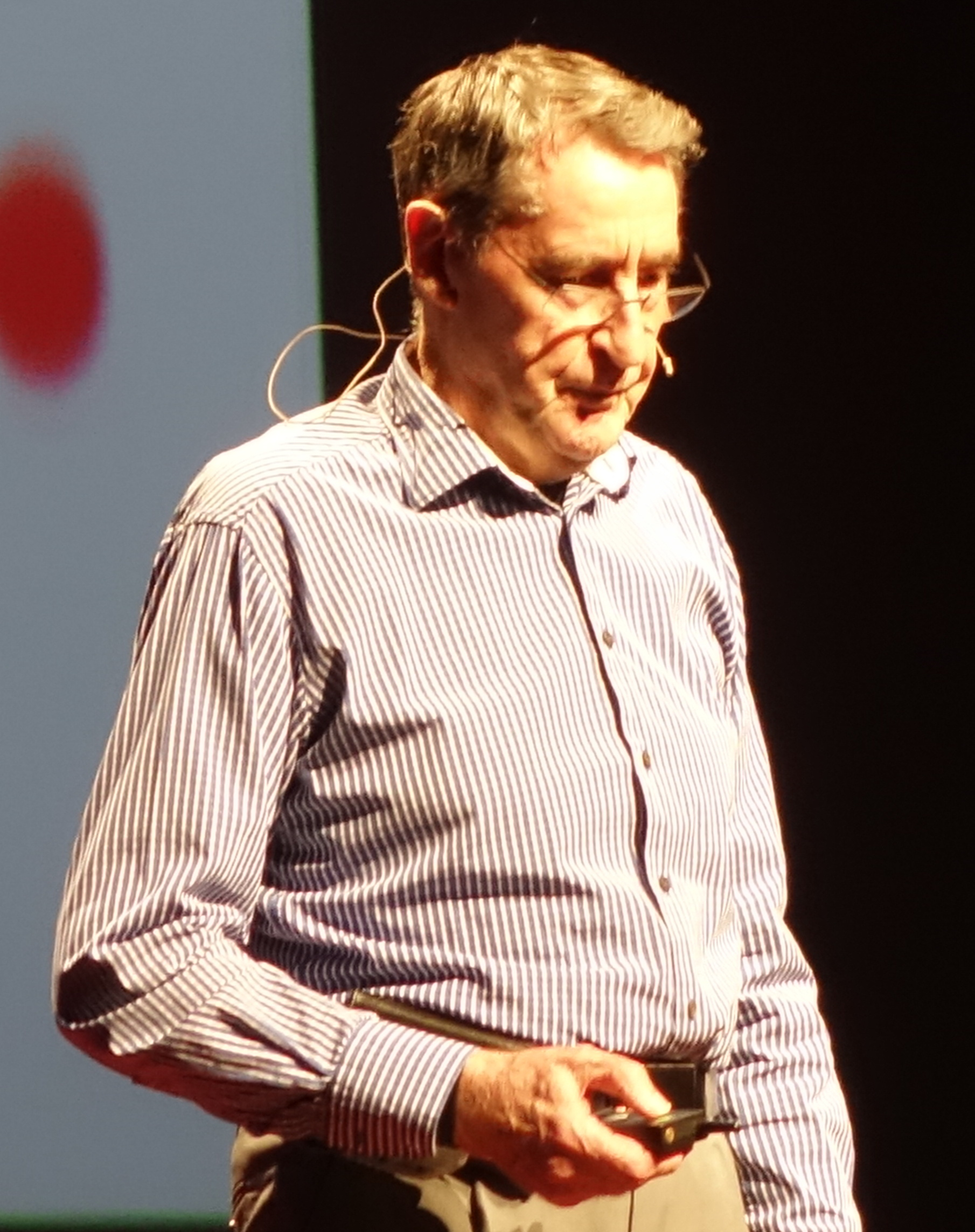
Vercoe in 2016

Barry Lloyd Vercoe (24 July 1937 – 15 June 2025) was an American computer scientist and composer. Born in New Zealand, he is best known as the inventor of Csound, a music synthesis language with wide usage among computer music composers. SAOL, the underlying language for the MPEG-4 Structured Audio standard, is also historically derived from Csound.

== Life and career ==
Born in Wellington, New Zealand, Vercoe received undergraduate degrees in music (1959) and mathematics (1962) from the University of Auckland before emigrating to the United States. While employed as an assistant professor at the Oberlin Conservatory of Music (1965–1967) and as the Contemporary Music Project's Seattle/Tacoma composer-in-residence (1967–1968), he earned his AMusD in composition from the University of Michigan (where he studied with Ross Lee Finney) in 1968. Prior to taking these positions, Vercoe supported his doctoral studies by working as a staff statistician at Michigan; it was in this capacity that first acquired an aptitude for computer programming by learning MAD. In 1965, he married fellow composer and Michigan graduate student Elizabeth Vercoe; they had two children before divorcing in the early 1990s. He married Kathryn Veda Vaughn in 1993. During a summer respite from his doctoral studies and a subsequent two-year postdoctoral fellowship at Princeton University under Godfrey Winham, his research in digital audio processing paved the way for the subsequent evolution of digital musical composition. From 1970 to 1971, he served as a visiting lecturer at the Yale School of Music.

In 1971, Vercoe became an assistant professor of humanities at the Massachusetts Institute of Technology. As one of the epoch's few specialists in digital synthesis, he speculated that he had indirectly been recruited by president Jerome Wiesner through colleagues John Harbison and David Epstein because Wiesner harboured musical inclinations (having previously collaborated with Alan Lomax) and sought to establish an electronic music laboratory as an inevitable extension of the institution's mandate. After a two-year period in which Vercoe designed a real-time digital synthesizer, Wiesner and Edward Fredkin personally procured a PDP-11 for the fledgling research programme from Digital Equipment Corporation in the summer of 1973, enabling him to abandon his previous methodology in favour of a streamlined, software-based approach. Shortly thereafter, the Experimental Music Studio was formed in laboratory space vacated by Amar Bose. Following promotion to associate professor in 1974, he joined the Lab for Computer Science as an associate member in 1977. He became a founding member of the MIT Media Lab upon promotion to full professor in 1984 and continued as professor emeritus of music and media arts. For many years, he directed research in machine listening and digital audio synthesis as head of the Lab's Music, Mind, and Machine group and served as associate academic head of its graduate programme in media arts and sciences from 2000 until his retirement in 2010. His notable students include Susan Frykberg, Miller Puckette and Paris Smaragdis.

Vercoe served as a consultant for the Boston Composers Project bibliography of Boston-area composers and compositions, first edition published in 1983.

As of 2015, Vercoe resided in Tauranga, New Zealand, where he co-founded and directed One Education, an offshoot of the One Laptop per Child initiative. He was also an accomplished jazz musician.

Vercoe died in Tauranga on 15 June 2025, at the age of 87.

== See also ==
- Score following
