= Carol Walker =

American mathematician (1935–2026)

Carol Lee Walker (August 19, 1935 – February 25, 2026) was an American mathematician and mathematics textbook author. Walker's early mathematical research, in the 1960s and 1970s, concerned the theory of abelian groups. In the 1990s, her interests shifted to fuzzy logic and fuzzy control systems.

== Life and career ==
Walker was born in Martinez, California, on August 19, 1935, and went to high school in Montrose, Colorado. She studied music education at the University of Colorado Boulder, with a year off to work as a primary-school music teacher in Colorado, and graduated in 1957. Next, she went to the University of Denver for graduate study in mathematics, but after one year transferred to New Mexico State University, where she earned a master's degree in 1961 and completed her PhD in 1963. Her dissertation, On $p^{\alpha}$-pure sequences of abelian groups, was supervised by David Kent Harrison. In 1963, she became the first woman to earn a Ph.D. at NMSU, and only the second person to earn a Ph.D. in math.

After postdoctoral research at the Institute for Advanced Study, she returned to New Mexico State University as an assistant professor in 1964, and quickly earned tenure as an associate professor in 1966. She was promoted to full professor in 1972. She chaired the Department of Mathematical Sciences from 1979 to 1993, and served as associate dean of arts and sciences from 1993 until her retirement in 1996.

Walker was married to Elbert Walker (1930–2018), another mathematician who joined the New Mexico State University faculty in 1957. Her daughter is composer Elaine Walker. Carol Walker died on February 25, 2026, at the age of 90.

== Books ==
Walker is the coauthor of books including:

- Mathematics for the Liberal Arts Student (with Fred Richman and Robert J. Wisner, Brooks-Cole, 1967; 2nd ed., 1973; 3rd ed., with James Brewer, Prentice-Hall, 2000; 4th ed., 2003)
- Doing Mathematics with Scientific WorkPlace (with Darel Hardy, Brooks-Cole, 1995; multiple editions)
- A First Course in Fuzzy and Neural Control (with Hung T. Nguyen, Radipuram Prasad, and Elbert Walker, CRC Press, 2003)
- Applied Algebra: Codes, Ciphers, and Discrete Algorithms (with Darel Hardy, Prentice-Hall, 2003)
- Calculus: Understanding Its Concepts and Methods (with Darel Hardy, Fred Richman, and Robert J. Wisner, MacKichan Software, 2006)

== Recognition ==
The New Mexico State University alumni gave Walker their Distinguished Alumni Award in 2001.
