= Norcroft C compiler =

- Original author: Codemist Limited
- Licence: Proprietary commercial software
- Website: www.codemist.co.uk/ncc/

The Norcroft C compiler (also referred to as the Norcroft compiler suite) in computing is a portable set of C/C++ programming tools written by Codemist, available for a wide range of processor architectures.

Norcroft C was developed by Codemist, established in November 1987 by a group of academics from the University of Cambridge and University of Bath; Arthur Norman, Alan Mycroft and John Fitch. Development took place from at least 1985; the company was dissolved in May 2016. The name Norcroft is derived from the original authors' surnames.

== Supported architectures ==
=== Acorn C/C++ ===
Acorn C/C++ was released for the RISC OS operating system, developed in collaboration with Acorn Computers.

=== Apple MessagePad NewtonOS ===
A 1996 version of the Norcroft C/C++ tools was part of the Newton C++ Toolbox (NCT) and the Driver Developers Kit (Lantern DDK).

=== INMOS Transputer C Compiler ===
This compiler for the INMOS Transputer was developed in collaboration with Perihelion Software.

=== Cambridge Consultants XAP ===
This compiler for Cambridge Consultants' XAP processor is another Norcroft compiler.
