= Smaragdus (name) =

Smaragdus (Ancient Greek: Σμάραγδος, Smaragdos) is a Latin masculine given name of ultimately Semitic origin, meaning "emerald". It may refer to:

- Saint Smaragdus (d. c. 303), Roman Christian martyr, companion of Cyriacus
- Saint Smaragdus (d. 320), one of the Forty Martyrs of Sebaste
- Smaragdus (fl. 585–611), Byzantine administrator
- Ardo Smaragdus (died 843), hagiographer
- Smaragdus of Saint-Mihiel (d. c. 840), Benedictine monk

== See also ==
- Smaragdis
