= Paris Smaragdis =

Computer scientist

Paris Smaragdis is a computer scientist noted for his contributions to audio signal processing, computer audition, and machine learning. He is a full professor in EECS and MTA departments at Massachusetts Institute of Technology and Principal Investigator at the Research Laboratory of Electronics. He currently holds over 35 patents in the areas of audio signal processing and machine learning.

== Biography ==
Smaragdis received his bachelor's degree in music (magna cum laude) from the Berklee College of Music in 1995, where he worked with Richard Boulanger. He received his S.M. and PhD from the Massachusetts Institute of Technology in 1997 and 2001, respectively. While there, he worked with Professor Barry Vercoe.

In 2002, he joined Mitsubishi Electric Research Laboratories (MERL) as a research scientist. From 2007 to 2010, Smaragdis was a senior research scientist at Adobe Research. In 2010, he joined the University of Illinois in Urbana-Champaign (UIUC) where he holds appointments in the UIUC Departments of Computer Science (CS) and Electrical & Computer Engineering (ECE).

== Public service and education ==
Smaragdis has been active in academic and industry public service. From 2009 to the present, he has been a steering committee member for the International Conference on Independent Component Analysis and Signal Separation. In 2013 and 2014, Smaragdis was the chair of the IEEE Machine Learning for Signal Processing Technical Committee. From 2012 to 2015, he chaired the steering committee for the International Conference on Latent Variable Analysis. In 2018 he joined the board of directors of the IEEE Signal Processing Society. And in 2019 and 2020, he was the chair of the IEEE Audio and Acoustic Signal Processing Technical Committee.

In 2017, with Professor Heinrich Taube, Smaragdis founded the University of Illinois' CS+Music undergraduate degree program, designed to foster interdisciplinary scholars in the core principles of both disciplines.

== Awards and honors ==
In 2006, the MIT Technology Review named Smaragdis one of the Top 35 Young Innovators Under 35. In 2015, Smaragdis was named a Fellow of the Institute of Electrical and Electronics Engineers (IEEE) for his contributions to audio source separation and audio processing. In 2016, he received the University of Illinois Distinguished Promotion Award for "exceptional cases of scholars whose contributions have been extraordinary in terms of quality of work and overall achievement." In 2017, he received the IEEE Machine Learning for Signal Processing (MLSP) Best Paper Award and the IEEE Signal Processing Society Best Paper Award.
