= Controllerism =

Art of using musical software controllers

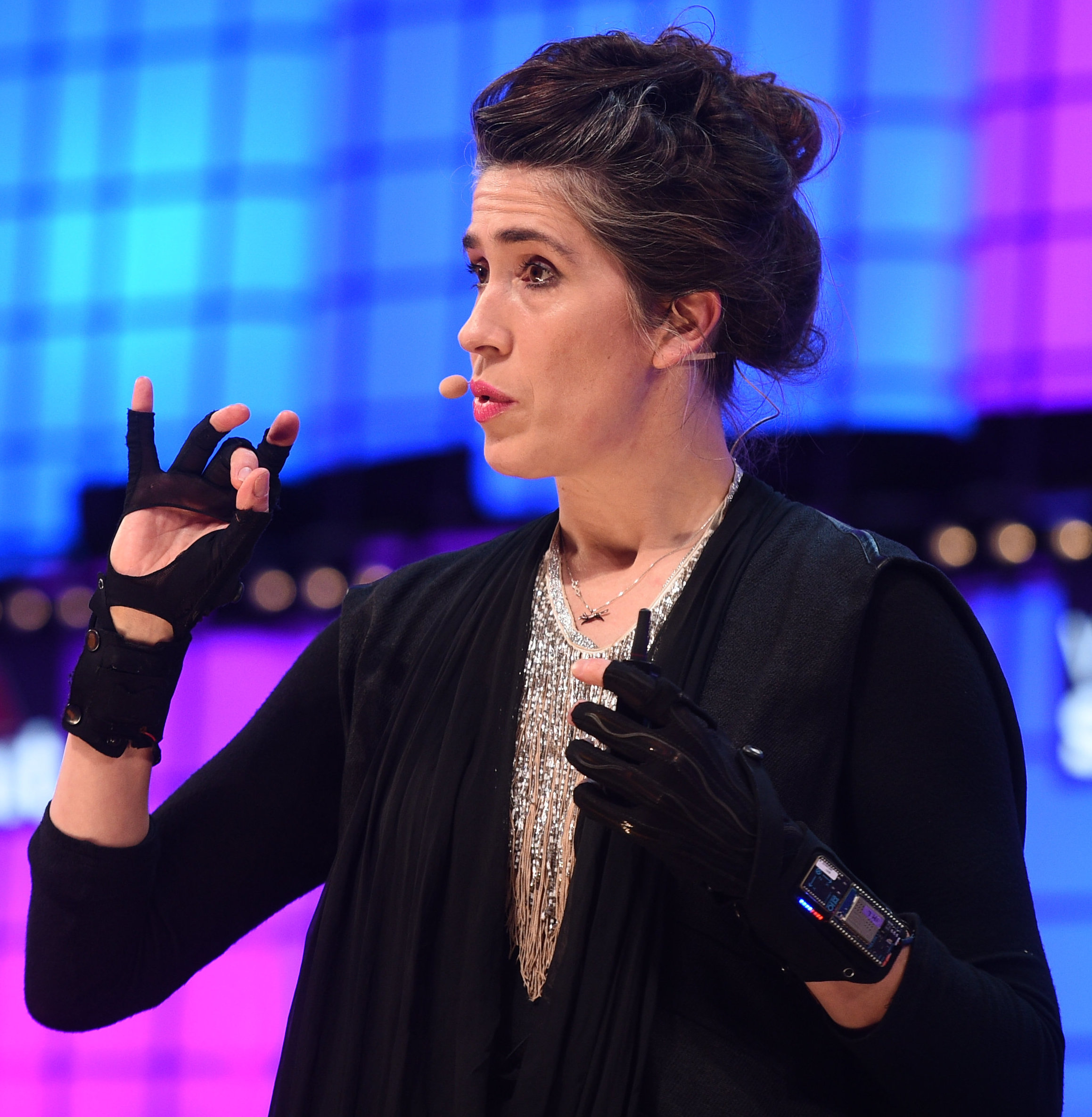
Imogen Heap using datagloves for performance.

Controllerism is the art and practice of using musical software controllers, e.g. MIDI, OSC, DJ controller, joystick, etc., to build upon, mix, scratch, remix, effect, modify, or otherwise create music, usually by a digital DJ or Live PA performer, often called a controllerist. Controllerism is also a nod to traditional musicianship and instrumentalism paired with modern computer sequencing software such as Ableton Live and Traktor. However, a working knowledge of scales and chords is not necessarily required as the performers typically focus their efforts more on sequencing events, software effects and instrument manipulations using buttons, knobs, faders, keys, foot switches, and pedals than on instrumental notes played in real time.

With recent developments in music technology, particularly in software instruments, a USB MIDI controller enables musicians almost unlimited possibilities to control a wide variety of sound types.

== Birth of the term ==
In 2005, Moldover and Dj Shakey (Julie Covello) met at the Burning Man Festival at a camp where Moldover was leading an Ableton Live workshop. Shakey approached Moldover after the class and they exchanged contact information, bonding over their ideas about performing with computers and controllers. When they returned to New York where they lived, Shakey, an event producer, proposed to Moldover that they start a party for Ableton Live performers. They created The Warper Party, a monthly artist showcase that was quickly expanded to include all electronic musicians pushing the boundaries of live performance. The event was popular and became a place for like-minded performers to meet, network, experiment, and build community.

Not long afterward, Shakey became Moldover's manager. She suggested that, since there was no catchy name for what he or their Warper community members were doing, they come up with one to make marketing his talents easier. After some brainstorming and debating between them, the name controllerism was chosen. Shakey believed presenting controllerism to the world in print would be beneficial to Moldover as an artist. Moldover reached out to his contact Ean Golden from Remix Magazine and proposed they write an article about it. The article "Music Maneuvers: Discover the Digital Turntablism Concept, Controllerism, Compliments of Moldover" appeared in the October 2007 issue of Remix magazine.

== Styles ==
Controllerism, like turntablism, typically involves complex musical routines using the controller in the manner of a musical instrument rather than a simple mixer. Some DJs use turntables and controllers simultaneously, blending the two techniques. Live PA performers often incorporate instruments or vocals.

== Software and equipment ==
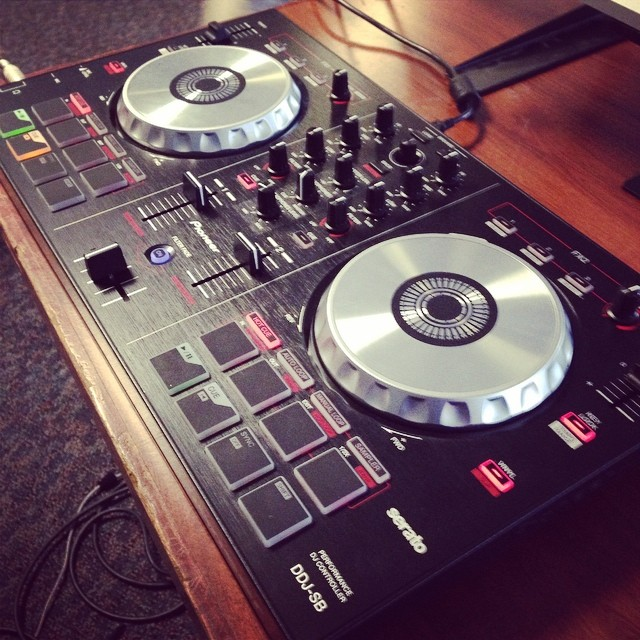
A DJ controller with jog wheels emulating decks

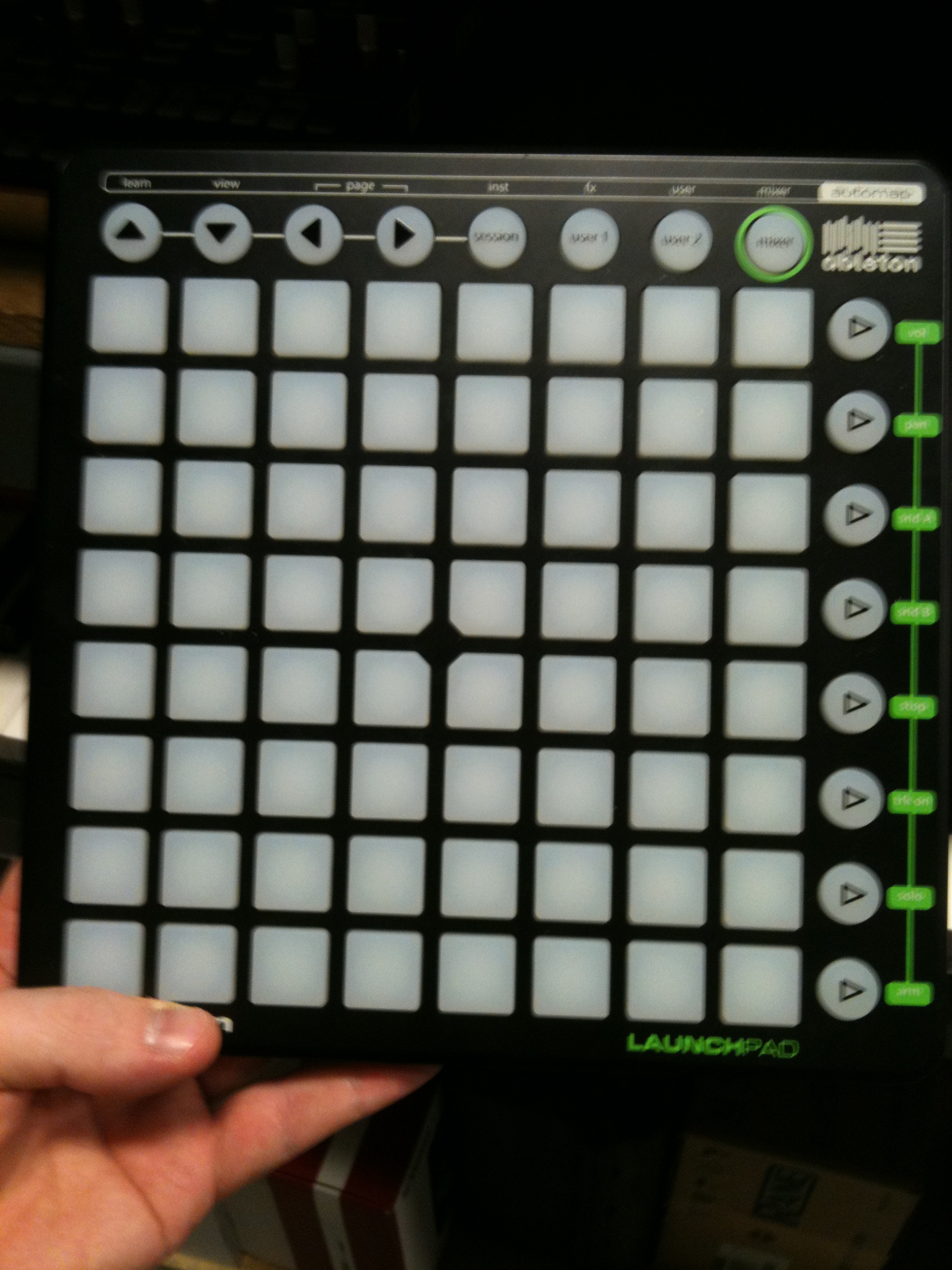
A grid-based button controller

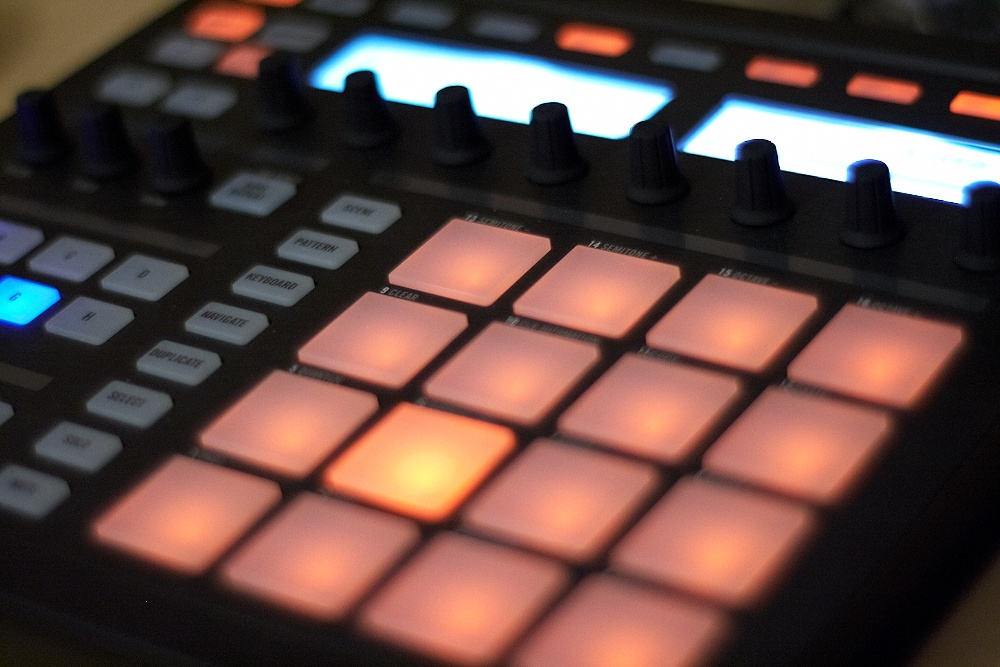
A drum pad controller

Since controllerism depends on a physical controller and a software interface, there is considerable uniqueness with equipment and personal styles among controllerists. There are three main classes of software used by controllerists: DAWs which have special functionality aimed at live performance, such as Ableton Live, sample-centered music software such as Maschine by Native Instruments, and DJ programs which have a powerful sample player/looper such as Native Instruments Traktor with its "remix decks" feature. Popular software for controllerists includes Ableton Live, Native Instruments Traktor and Maschine, Akai MPC, VirtualDJ, Serato Scratch Live and Max. There are alternate platforms that are less common, including FL Studio, Bitwig, Torq, and Deckadance.

Hardware typically consists of a physical controller, most often a MIDI or human interface device, often resembling a scaled-down CDJ setup (albeit, without hardware CD players) or a pad controller resembling the traditional Akai MPC; a newer class of controllers is represented by grid-based button controllers such as the Novation Launchpad. Some include built-in sound card interfaces and others rely on the PC's internal sound setup or make use of a breakout box with a sound card. Some makers of controllers include Akai Professional, Numark Industries, Native Instruments, Novation, Vestax, Livid Instruments, Keith McMillen, Denon, Monome. Some DJ CD Players, such as the Pioneer Corporation CDJ800 and Numark MixDeck can also function as controllers. Older controllers occasionally used standard MIDI connectors, most controllers today are USB-based.

Some controllers depart from the traditional two-deck system and incorporate four decks, effects sections, or do away with the traditional deck/mixer setup altogether, such as button grid controllers (originally intended to launch Ableton Live clips), drum pads MPC-style controllers (originally used for finger-drumming), touch-screen interfaces, arcade buttons and other devices. Many DJs use turntables and CDJs with timecode records to utilize the device in a similar manner as a controller. The software that interprets the timecode vinyl is called vinyl emulation software.

== Custom controllers ==
Matt Moldover made custom MIDI controllers in an attempt to make DJing an experience beyond that of simply two turntables and a mixer. As of 2012, he's made the design and programming files of his Mojo MIDI controller open-source, along with instructions on how to build it.

In this, he followed in the footsteps of English DJ Sasha, who had a custom controller built back in 2005, and indeed a very long tradition stretching all the way back to Grandmaster Flash, who in the 1970s used to rewire his mixers by hand, or even build them, using raw materials he found in junkyards.

== Events ==
As controllerism gains acceptance in the DJ World and the club scenes, many controllerists have begun to collaborate and compete in the same manner that turntablists have been doing for many years in events such as in the DMC Championship. One of the first events of this sort was the Midi Fight Club, a tour of Controllerist and Controllerist/Turntablist DJs including such notables as DJ Shiftee, DJ Craze, Ean Golden, Miami's The Overthrow, Ed Paris, DJ Dystopic, DJ Velz, Detroit's Edison, Ryan Start, and Hedgehog.

== See also ==
- Electronic music
- NIME
- Turntablism
