= Space Access Society =

- Founded: 1992
- Location: Phoenix
- Key people: Henry Vanderbilt
- Website: http://www.space-access.org/

The Space Access Society (SAS) is an organization dedicated to increasing the viability and reducing the cost of commercial access to space travel. It was founded by Henry Vanderbilt, who was the president from the organizations' founding in 1992 until January 2006.

== Activities ==
The SAS is primarily noted for two activities:

- Space policy activity and review reports, known as SAS updates, which were emailed and web posted at irregular intervals. These included both factual current events and policy analysis, and were largely or entirely written by Henry Vanderbilt.
- Space Access conferences, held in the spring in Phoenix, Arizona, from 1994 to 2016. In 2019, the event took place in Fremont, California. There was also a Making Orbit conference held in Berkeley, California in 1993..

The Space Access conferences are known in the reusable space launch community and space launch vehicle communities for bringing together companies working in the field, ranging from large aerospace companies such as Boeing and Lockheed-Martin, and smaller companies such as Rotary Rocket, XCOR Aerospace, Pioneer Rocketplane, Armadillo Aerospace, etc. NASA and the Federal Aviation Administration also have consistently sent representatives. Many Ansari X-Prize team members were consistent attendees.

Presentations at the conference range from informal to viewgraphs and paper handouts. There is no conference proceedings, to encourage the free discussion of issues which participants may not want to go on documented record. Social networking among the industry leaders present is a major feature of the conferences as well.

== See also ==
- Private spaceflight
- Space advocacy
- Space colonization
- Space exploration
- Vision for Space Exploration
