= John Fitch (computer scientist) =

Computer scientist, mathematician and composer

- Born: John Peter Fitch; December 1945 (age 80); Barnsley, UK
- Died: June 11, 2026 (aged 80); Bath, UK
- Other name: John ffitch
- Education: University of Cambridge
- Awards: Adams Prize (1975)
- Scientific career
- Workplaces: University of Bath; University of Leeds; Maynooth University
- Thesis: An algebraic manipulator (1971)
- Doctoral advisor: David Barton
- Doctoral students: James Davenport; Tom Crick

John Peter Fitch (also known as John ffitch) was a computer scientist, mathematician and composer, who has worked on relativity, planetary astronomy, computer algebra and Lisp. Alongside Victor Lazzarini and Steven Yi, he was the project leader for audio programming language Csound, having a leading role in its development since the early 1990s; and he was a director of Codemist Ltd, which developed the Norcroft C compiler.

== Education and early life ==
Born in Barnsley, Yorkshire, England in December 1945, Fitch was educated at St John's College, Cambridge where he gained a PhD from the University of Cambridge in 1971 supervised by David Barton.

== Career and research ==
Fitch spent six years at Cambridge as a postdoctoral researcher, winning the Adams Prize for Mathematics in 1975 for a joint essay with David Barton on Applications of algebraic manipulative systems to physics.

Fitch was a visiting professor the University of Utah for a year, then lectured at the University of Leeds for 18 months, before becoming professor and then chair of software engineering at the University of Bath, which his biography claims is "a subject about which he knows little"; his 31-year career there lasted April 1980 – September 2011, after which he was named an adjunct professor of music at Maynooth University.

Fitch lectured for the module CM20029: The Essence of Compilers, as well as optional modules involving computer music and digital signal processing. According to his biography, "despite his long hair and beard, and the uncertain spelling of his name, [he] was never a hippie".

His former doctoral students include James Davenport and Tom Crick.

== Personal life ==
Fitch was married to historian Audrey Fitch.

He died in Bath on 11 June 2026, following a fall at home.
