= Arthur Norman (computer scientist) =

British computer scientist

- Known for: Norcroft C compiler
- Scientific career
- Fields: Computer science
- Institutions: University of Cambridge; Computer Laboratory

Arthur C. Norman is a British computer scientist, and Fellow of Trinity College, Cambridge, where he has previously been a Director of Studies for Computer Science.

== Education ==
Awarded a distinction in computer science in 1970.

== Teaching ==
Norman delivered his last lecture at the Computer Laboratory on 3 December 2008 but his notes are still used as teaching resources. The Trinity College Science Society often has Dr. Norman back for talks.

== Publications ==
- Norman, A. and Cattell, G. 1983. "LISP on the B. B. C. Microcomputer" AcornSoft, Cambridge, England.
- Matooane, M. and Norman, A "A Parallel Symbolic Computation Environment: Structures and Mechanics." Euro-Par 1999: 1492-1495
- Norman, A. and Fitch, J "CABAL: polynomial and power series algebra on a parallel computer." PASCO 1997: 196-203
- Norman, A. and Fitch, J. "Interfacing REDUCE to Java." DISCO 1996: 271-276
- Norman, A. and Fitch, J. "Memory Tracing of Algebraic Calculations." ISSAC 1996: 113-119
