= List of accolades received by Queen (film) =

Queen is a 2013 Indian comedy-drama film directed by Vikas Bahl and produced by Anurag Kashyap and Vikramaditya Motwane. The film stars Kangana Ranaut in the lead role, and features Rajkummar Rao and Lisa Haydon in supporting roles. The film was edited by Abhijit Kokate and Kashyap, and the cinematography was provided by Bobby Singh. Amit Trivedi composed the musical score for the film. Queen tells the story of Rani, an under-confident woman, who embarks on her honeymoon alone after her fiancé calls off their wedding.

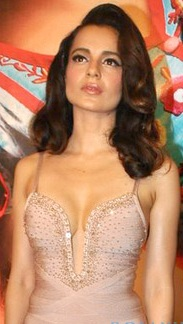
Kangana Ranaut's performance in Queen garnered her several awards and nominations including the National Film Award for Best Actress at the 62nd National Film Awards.

Made on a budget of ₹125 million (US$1.5 million), Queen was released on 7 March 2014, and grossed ₹970 million (US$11 million) worldwide. The film garnered awards and nominations in several categories, with particular praise for its direction, performance of Ranaut, cinematography, and editing. As of June 2015, the film has won 32 awards.

At the 62nd National Film Awards, Queen won the awards for Best Feature Film in Hindi and Best Actress (Ranaut). At the 60th Filmfare Awards ceremony, Queen won six awards, more than any other film, including Best Film, Best Director (Bahl), and Best Actress. Haydon and Tridevi also garnered nominations for Best Supporting Actress and Best Music Director, respectively. Queen received the most nominations at the 2015 Screen Awards ceremony, and won the awards for Best Film, Best Director, and Best Cinematography (Singh). Ranaut, Rao and Haydon were nominated for Best Actress, Best Supporting Actor and Best Supporting Actress, respectively. The film also won five awards at the 16th ceremony of the International Indian Film Academy Awards, including Best Movie and Best Actress.

== Accolades ==
Award	Date of ceremony (Note: Date is linked to the article about the awards held that year, wherever possible.)	Category	Recipients	Result	Ref.
BIG Star Entertainment Awards	18 December 2014	Most Entertaining Actor in a Social Drama Film – Female	Kangana Ranaut	Nominated	
BIG Star Entertainment Awards	18 December 2014	Most Entertaining Social Drama Film	Queen	Nominated	
BIG Star Entertainment Awards	18 December 2014	Most Entertaining Director (Film)	Vikas Bahl	Won	
BIG Star Entertainment Awards	18 December 2014	Most Entertaining Film of the Year	Queen	Nominated	
BIG Star Entertainment Awards	18 December 2014	Most Entertaining Actor (Film) – Female	Kangana Ranaut	Nominated	
Filmfare Awards	31 January 2015	Best Film	Queen	Won	
Filmfare Awards	31 January 2015	Best Director	Vikas Bahl	Won	
Filmfare Awards	31 January 2015	Best Actress	Kangana Ranaut	Won	
Filmfare Awards	31 January 2015	Best Background Score	Amit Trivedi	Won	
Filmfare Awards	31 January 2015	Best Editing	Anurag Kashyap, Abhijit Kokate	Won	
Filmfare Awards	31 January 2015	Best Cinematography	Bobby Singh	Won	
Filmfare Awards	31 January 2015	Best Supporting Actress	Lisa Haydon	Nominated	
Filmfare Awards	31 January 2015	Best Music Director	Amit Trivedi	Nominated	
Global Indian Music Academy Awards	24 February 2015	Best Background Score	Amit Trivedi	Nominated	
Global Indian Music Academy Awards	24 February 2015	Best Music Arranger & Programmer	Amit Trivedi, Sourav Roy	Won	
Global Indian Music Academy Awards	24 February 2015	Best Music Director	Amit Trivedi	Won	
Global Indian Music Academy Awards	24 February 2015	Best Playback Singer – Female	Nandini Srikar (for song "Harjaiyaan")	Nominated	
Global Indian Music Academy Awards	24 February 2015	Best Playback Singer – Male	Labh Janjua (for song "London Thumakda")	Nominated	
Global Indian Music Academy Awards	24 February 2015	Best Film Song	"London Thumakda"	Won	
Global Indian Music Academy Awards	24 February 2015	Best Film Album	Queen	Nominated	
Indian Film Festival of Melbourne	3 May 2014	Best Actress	Kangana Ranaut	Won	
International Indian Film Academy Awards	7 June 2015 (Note: The awards in the technical categories were announced on 22 April 2015. The presentation for the awards in the technical category was held on 5 June 2015, and the main award ceremony took place on 7 June 2015.)	Best Movie	Queen	Won	
International Indian Film Academy Awards	7 June 2015	Best Director	Vikas Bahl	Nominated	
International Indian Film Academy Awards	7 June 2015	Best Actress	Kangana Ranaut	Won	
International Indian Film Academy Awards	7 June 2015	Best Supporting Actress	Lisa Haydon	Nominated	
International Indian Film Academy Awards	7 June 2015	Best Story	Vikas Bahl, Chaitali Parmar, Parvez Shaikh	Won	
International Indian Film Academy Awards	7 June 2015	Best Screenplay	Vikas Bahl, Chaitali Parmar, Parvez Shaikh	Won	
International Indian Film Academy Awards	7 June 2015	Best Editing	Anurag Kashyap, Abhijit Kokate	Won	
Jagran Film Festival	28 September 2014	Best Actor (Female)	Kangana Ranaut	Won	
Jagran Film Festival	28 September 2014	Best Music	Amit Trivedi	Won	
Jagran Film Festival	28 September 2014	Best Singer (Female)	Shefali Alvares (for song "O Gujariya")	Won	
Lions Gold Awards	8 January 2015	Favourite Actress in Supporting Role (Female)	Lisa Haydon	Won	
Mirchi Music Awards	27 February 2015	Song of the Year	"London Thumakda"	Nominated	
Mirchi Music Awards	27 February 2015	Album of the Year	Queen	Nominated	
Mirchi Music Awards	27 February 2015	Upcoming Vocalist (Male) of the Year	Rupesh Kumar Ram (for song "Ranjha")	Nominated	
Mirchi Music Awards	27 February 2015	Upcoming Lyricist of the Year	Raghu Nath (for song "Ranjha")	Nominated	
Mirchi Music Awards	27 February 2015	Programmer & Arranger of the Year	Amit Trivedi, Sourav Roy (for song "London Thumakda")	Nominated	
National Film Awards	3 May 2015	Best Actress	Kangana Ranaut	Won	
National Film Awards	3 May 2015	Best Feature Film in Hindi	Queen	Won	
Screen Awards	14 January 2015	Best Film	Queen	Won	
Screen Awards	14 January 2015	Best Director	Vikas Bahl	Won	
Screen Awards	14 January 2015	Best Actress	Kangana Ranaut	Nominated	
Screen Awards	14 January 2015	Best Actress – Popular Choice	Kangana Ranaut	Nominated	
Screen Awards	14 January 2015	Best Supporting Actor	Rajkummar Rao	Nominated	
Screen Awards	14 January 2015	Best Supporting Actress	Lisa Haydon	Nominated	
Screen Awards	14 January 2015	Best Music Director	Amit Trivedi	Nominated	
Screen Awards	14 January 2015	Best Male Playback	Labh Janjua (for song "London Thumakda")	Nominated	
Screen Awards	14 January 2015	Best Screenplay	Vikas Bahl, Chaitali Parmar, Parvez Shaikh	Nominated	
Screen Awards	14 January 2015	Best Dialogue	Anvita Dutt Guptan, Kangana Ranaut	Nominated	
Screen Awards	14 January 2015	Best Child Artist	Chinmaya Agrawal	Nominated	
Screen Awards	14 January 2015	Best Editing	Anurag Kashyap, Abhijit Kokate	Nominated	
Screen Awards	14 January 2015	Best Cinematography	Bobby Singh	Won	
Screen Awards	14 January 2015	Best Costume	Manoshi Nath, Rushi Sharma	Nominated	
Star Guild Awards (Note: Also known as Apsara Film & Television Producers Guild Awards.)	12 January 2015	Best Film	Queen	Nominated	
Star Guild Awards	12 January 2015	Best Director	Vikas Bahl	Won	
Star Guild Awards	12 January 2015	Best Actress in a Leading Role	Kangana Ranaut	Nominated	
Star Guild Awards	12 January 2015	Best Actress in a Supporting Role	Lisa Haydon	Nominated	
Star Guild Awards	12 January 2015	Best Male Playback Singer	Labh Janjua (for song "London Thumakda")	Nominated	
Star Guild Awards	12 January 2015	Best Story	Vikas Bahl, Chaitali Parmar, Parvez Shaikh	Won	
Star Guild Awards	12 January 2015	Best Screenplay	Vikas Bahl, Chaitali Parmar, Parvez Shaikh	Won	
Star Guild Awards	12 January 2015	Best Dialogue	Anvita Dutt Guptan, Kangana Ranaut	Nominated	
Star Guild Awards	12 January 2015	Best Lyrics	Anvita Dutt Guptan (for song "London Thumakda")	Nominated	
Star Guild Awards	12 January 2015	Best Music Director	Amit Trivedi (for song "London Thumakda")	Nominated	
Star Guild Awards	12 January 2015	Best Editing	Anurag Kashyap, Abhijit Kokate	Won	
Stardust Awards	15 December 2014	Best Film	Queen	Won	
Stardust Awards	15 December 2014	Best Director	Vikas Bahl (Note: Tied with Imtiaz Ali for Highway.)	Won	
Stardust Awards	15 December 2014	Best Actress	Kangana Ranaut	Won	
Stardust Awards	15 December 2014	Star of the Year Award – Female	Kangana Ranaut	Nominated	
Stardust Awards	15 December 2014	Best Music Director	Amit Trivedi	Nominated	
Stardust Awards	15 December 2014	Best Playback Singer – Female	Neha Kakkar, Sonu Kakkar (for song "London Thumakda")	Nominated	

== See also ==
- List of Bollywood films of 2014
