= Paris Paris =

Unreleased Indian film

- Poster
- Directed by: Ramesh Aravind
- Screenplay by: Ramesh Aravind
- Story by: Vikas Bahl
- Based on: Queen by Vikas Bahl
- Produced by: Manu Kumaran
- Starring: Kajal Aggarwal
- Cinematography: Satya Hegde
- Edited by: Rajan Mohammed
- Music by: Amit Trivedi
- Production companies: Mediente International Films Ltd; Liger Commercial Brokers
- Country: India
- Language: Tamil

Paris Paris is an unreleased Indian Tamil-language comedy drama film directed by Ramesh Aravind and produced by Manu Kumaran. A remake of the 2013 Hindi film Queen by Vikas Bahl, the film stars Kajal Aggarwal alongside Elli Avram, Varun Shashi Rao, Vinaya Prasad, and Bhargavi Narayan.

The film began production in September 2017, and gained notability for being shot simultaneously by the same producers in Telugu as That Is Mahalakshmi, in Kannada as Butterfly, and in Malayalam as Zam Zam. All four versions, despite being completed, remain unreleased due to legal and financial issues.

== Cast ==
- Kajal Aggarwal as Parameshwari (Paris)
- Elli Avram as Rajalakshmi
- Vinaya Prasad
- Bhargavi Narayan
- Varun Shashi Rao
- Thirunavukkarasu
- Garry Fischmann
- Benoit Solès
- Anatole Yun
- Nagui Mehany
- Samarth Ashok Hegde
- T. P. Gajendran

== Production ==
=== Development ===
In June 2014, Viacom 18 Motion Pictures, the producers of the Hindi film Queen (2014), made an official announcement that they sold the remake rights for the Tamil, Telugu, Malayalam and Kannada versions of their film to Thiagarajan, who would make the films through his production studio, Staar Movies. Viacom put a caveat in the agreement that the principal photography of any of the films must start by 8 June 2017, else the rights would revert to Viacom. That July, Thiagarajan said that no one had been finalised as the lead actress and that he was still considering his options. Thiagarajan announced his potential plans of casting Lisa Haydon to reprise her supporting role and for his son Prashanth to act in the film, but remarked that he was unsure if Prashanth would accept to play a character with "grey shades". Samantha held discussions about portraying the film's lead role during July 2014, but turned the film down after being unconvinced about the way the original script was set to be adapted into the South Indian regional languages. Asin also rejected the offer due to her pending marriage.

After a period of inactivity and further media reports about the casting of the lead actress, Thiagarajan revealed in February 2016 that he had signed on Revathi to direct the Tamil version of the film, while Suhasini would work as the dialogue writer. Soon after, Nayanthara turned down the opportunity to work on the film citing scheduling issues during early 2016. In mid-2016, Trisha was also approached to play the lead role but conflicting schedules meant that she could not sign on to appear in the film. The media also linked actresses Parvathy Thiruvothu and Nithya Menen to the lead role, but neither were signed on. During an interaction with the media in November 2016, Thiagarajan revealed that he had finalised Revathi to direct the Tamil and Malayalam versions of the film, while Anish Kuruvilla and Prakash Raj would make the Telugu and Kannada versions respectively. He added that Tamannaah Bhatia would feature in the lead role of the Tamil version, while Amala Paul and Parul Yadav would reprise the role in the Malayalam and Kannada versions respectively. He also stated that Amy Jackson was signed on to feature in all four versions of the film in the role originally portrayed by Lisa Haydon. In April 2017, Bhatia stated that the film was shelved, though Thiagarajan refuted her claim and stated that production would begin in May 2017. He revealed that talks with the actress to play the lead role had fallen through after a dispute over her remuneration for the lead role.

In June 2017, further confusion about the remake arose after two separate production houses apart from Thiagarajan's Staar Movies had claimed rights to the film. As per a contract signed on 30 July 2016, Staar Movies agreed to enter into a co-production agreement with Mediente International Films Ltd and Liger Commercial Brokers for the making of the films. However a mutual cancellation form was then signed between the parties on 5 April 2017 after Mediente allegedly failed to pay the consideration provided under the agreement. Then, as per a contract signed on 21 April 2017, Staar Movies agreed to assign the rights of all four South Indian versions of Queen to Golden Crab Film Production Ltd. To avoid the reversion of rights back to Viacom due to three years of inactivity, Staar Movies and Golden Crab swiftly began shooting the film on 17 May 2017 with a series of supporting actors including Nassar under the title of Vaanil Thedi Nindren. However, on 3 June 2017, Staar Movies again assigned and transferred the remake rights of the film to Mediente and Liger, with the Kannada version of the film titled Butterfly (2018) featuring Parul Yadav, starting immediately with Ramesh Aravind taking over as director. Staar Movies then produced a declaration affidavit on 14 June 2017 that any agreement with Golden Crab Films was false. The final credits of the film indicate that the producer is Manu Kumaran of Mediente, with actress Parul Yadav, Staar Movies and Liger as co-producers.

Kajal Aggarwal revealed in August 2017 that she had agreed terms to play the lead role in the Tamil version of the film, which would also be directed by Ramesh Aravind and produced by Mediente, and that the film's shoot would begin in September 2017. In September 2017, it was revealed that Bhatia would instead work on the Telugu version of the film which would be directed by Neelakanta. Amala Paul also opted out of the Malayalam version citing date issues and was later replaced by Manjima Mohan. In late September 2017, Mediente announced that the Tamil film would be titled Paris Paris and the shoot would commence from October 2017. Writer Tamizhachi Thangapandian was signed to help adapt the script and opted to set the film in Virudhanagar, while music composer Amit Trivedi was signed to work on the Tamil and Kannada versions. In late October, Jackson left the film due to scheduling conflicts with the TV series Supergirl.

=== Filming ===
The film was launched in Chennai on 24 September 2017 with director Ramesh Aravind and actress Kajal Aggarwal in attendance. The team announced that they would film scenes in Virudhunagar, followed by schedules in various cities across Europe. Speaking about the Tamil remake at the film launch, Kajal Aggarwal said, "I loved the story ever since I saw the original! But we have to remember that the film, since it was made a couple of years ago, will have to be changed to keep it in sync with the current times. The makers of the film and I are very clear that we want to adapt Queen to Southern sensibilities, and do it our own way. While the script will essentially remain the same, the treatment will be personalised. I will also add my own touch to the role."

Filming began for the Tamil version in early November 2017, with the first schedule taking place in France. All four versions had scenes shot in Paris and Fréjus, with all four lead actresses on the sets of the films together. Scenes for the Tamil version in India were shot in Chennai and Virudhanagar, while a further schedule was completed in Athens. Production on all four films were completed in June 2018, with post-production work beginning thereafter.

In total, the four versions of the film cost ₹54 crore rupees to make, surpassing the initial budget of ₹40 crore rupees. A teaser of the Tamil version of the film was released in December 2018.

== Soundtrack ==
Paris Paris

Soundtrack album by Amit Trivedi
- Released: 5 February 2019
- Recorded: 2018–19
- Studio: A T Studios
- Genre: Feature film soundtrack
- Label: Zee Music Company
- Producer: Amit Trivedi

Amit Trivedi chronology
'Kedarnath' (2018)	Paris Paris (2019)	'Sye Raa Narasimha Reddy' (2019)

The music of the film is composed by Amit Trivedi and lyrics are by Thamizhachi Thangapandian and Parvathy.

Track listing
No.	Title	Lyrics	Singer(s)	Length
1.	"Annachi Kondadu"	Thamizhachi Thangapandian	Jassie Gift, Ananya Bhat (Backing vocals: Rajiv Sundaresan, Suhas Sawan and Arun HK)	3:36
2.	"Odhukka Nenacha"	Parvathy	Supriya Lohith, Sathyaprakash	3:54
3.	"Padaigal Illai Endru"	Viveka	Shashaa Tirupati, Arun Kamath	4:02
4.	"Sudoko Attam"	Viveka	Karthik, R Venkatraman (Rap)	3:36
5.	"Vazhve Neelade"	Thamizhachi Thangapandian	Chinmayi, Sathyaprakash	4:40
6.	"Iduva En Bhoomi"	Parvathy	Shashaa Tirupati, Nikhita Gandhi	3:41
7.	"Inda Somabanam"	Mohanranjan	Master Hirannaiah, Vijay Prakash, Vidya Vox, Amitabh Bachchan	3:08
8.	"Enge En Santosham"	Mohanranjan	Haricharan	3:53
Total length:				30:13

== Release ==
The film's release was delayed after the Central Board of Film Certification gave an "A" (adults only) certificate to the Tamil and Telugu versions of the film in August 2019. Co-producer Parul Yadav raised an objection to why only the Tamil and Telugu versions were flagged, when the Kannada, Malayalam and original Hindi films were given "U/A" certificates. She added that certain scenes from the original, such as the scene where the lead actress goes to a strip club, were not shot owing to cultural differences in Tamil Nadu. Producer Manu Kumaran was critical of how the Board had looked to censor the appearance and dialogues spoken by Elli Avram's character. In April 2020, Yadav suggested that the producers were keen to release all four versions of the film on the same day, and were thus waiting for the censorship decisions to be revised.

In July 2020, it was widely reported in the media that the producers were in discussions with Amazon Prime Video about the release of the four films via the streaming service. Songs from the four films were then later released on YouTube in early September 2020. Manu Kumaran subsequently announced that the films were yet to be sold to any streaming service and criticised the "male-chauvinistic" mindset of digital media companies for refusing to purchase the film. The four films remain unreleased owing to an ongoing litigation between Mediente and French on-location production studio Prodywood regarding non-payment, and Mediente and the film's main financiers, Taizoon Khorakiwala's Switz International.

== See also ==
- That Is Mahalakshmi
- Butterfly
- Zam Zam
