= Butterfly (unreleased film) =

Unreleased Indian film

- Poster
- Directed by: Ramesh Aravind
- Written by: Mamta Sagar
- Screenplay by: Ramesh Aravind
- Story by: Vikas Bahl
- Based on: Queen (2014) by Vikas Bahl
- Produced by: Manu Kumaran
- Starring: Parul Yadav
- Cinematography: Satya Hegde
- Edited by: Satchit Puranik; Manu Kumaran
- Music by: Amit Trivedi
- Production companies: Mediente International Films Ltd; Liger Commercial Brokers
- Country: India
- Language: Kannada

Butterfly is an unreleased Indian Kannada-language comedy drama film directed by Ramesh Aravind and produced by Manu Kumaran, which is a remake of the 2014 Hindi film Queen by Vikas Bahl. The film stars Parul Yadav and was simultaneously shot in Tamil as Paris Paris.

== Cast ==
- Parul Yadav as Parvati
- Elli Avram as Vijaylakshmi
- Varun Shashi Rao
- Sudha Belawadi
- Bhargavi Narayan

== Production ==
=== Development ===
In June 2014, Viacom 18 Motion Pictures, the producers of the Hindi film Queen (2014), made an official announcement that they hold sold the remake rights for the Tamil, Telugu, Malayalam and Kannada versions of their film to Thiagarajan, who would make the films through his production studio, Staar Movies. Viacom put a caveat in the agreement that the principal photography of any of the films must start by 8 June 2017, else the rights would revert to Viacom. Soon after the announcement in June 2014, several Indian directors and actresses expressed their desire to do the film, but Thiagarajan maintained that no one had been finalised and that he was still considering his options. Thiagarajan announced his potential plans of casting Lisa Haydon to reprise her supporting role and for his son Prashanth to act in the film, but remarked that he was unsure if Prashanth would accept to play a character with "grey shades". Samantha held discussions about portraying the film's lead role during July 2014, but turned the film down after being unconvinced about the way the original script was set to be adapted into the South Indian regional languages.

After a period of inactivity and further media reports about the casting of the lead actress, Thiagarajan revealed in February 2016 that he had signed on Revathi to direct the Tamil version of the film, while Suhasini would work as the dialogue writer. Soon after, Nayanthara turned down the opportunity to work on the film citing scheduling issues during early 2016. In mid-2016, Trisha was also approached to play the lead role but conflicting schedules meant that she could not sign on to appear in the film. The media also linked actresses Parvathy and Nithya Menen to the lead role, but neither were signed on. During an interaction with the media in November 2016, Thiagarajan revealed that he had finalised Revathi to direct the Tamil and Malayalam versions of the film, while Anish Kuruvilla and Prakash Raj would make the Telugu and Kannada versions respectively. He added that Tamannaah Bhatia would feature in the lead role of the Tamil version, while Amala Paul and Parul Yadav would reprise the role in the Malayalam and Kannada versions respectively. He also stated that Amy Jackson was signed on to feature in all four versions of the film in the role originally portrayed by Lisa Haydon.

In June 2017, further confusion about the remake arose after two separate production houses apart from Thiagarajan's Staar Movies had claimed rights to the film. As per a contract signed on 30 July 2016, Staar Movies agreed to enter into a co-production agreement with Mediente International Films Ltd and Liger Commercial Brokers for the making of the films. However a mutual cancellation form was then signed between the parties on 5 April 2017 after Mediente allegedly failed to pay the consideration provided under the agreement. Then, as per a contract signed on 21 April 2017, Staar Movies agreed to assign the rights of all four South Indian versions of Queen to Golden Crab Film Production Ltd. In order to avoid the reversion of rights back to Viacom due to three years of inactivity, Staar Movies and Golden Crab swiftly began shooting the film in Tamil on 17 May 2017 with a series of supporting actors including Nassar under the title of Vaanil Thedi Nindren. However, on 3 June 2017, Staar Movies again assigned and transferred the remake rights of the film to Mediente and Liger, with the Kannada version of the film titled Butterfly featuring Parul Yadav, starting immediately with Ramesh Aravind taking over as director. A few days of shoot for the film were subsequently held during early June 2017 with Sudha Belawadi and Bhargavi Narayan also featuring in the schedule. Staar Movies then produced a declaration affidavit on 14 June 2017 that any agreement with Golden Crab Films was false.

In late September 2017, Mediente announced that the Tamil version would be made as Paris Paris (2018) with Kajal Aggarwal, the Malayalam version would be made as Zam Zam with Manjima Mohan and the Telugu version would be made as That is Mahalakshmi with Tamannaah. Amy Jackson was initially in talks to play the role Lisa Haydon played in Queen however opted out due to unavailability of dates and creative differences. Elli Avram was later cast in the role. Writer Mamta Sagar was signed to help adapt the script and opted to set the film in Gokarna, while music composer Amit Trivedi was signed to work on the Tamil and Kannada versions.

=== Filming ===
The film was launched in Bangalore on 4 June 2017 with director Ramesh Aravind and actress Parul Yadav in attendance. Production began with a five-day workshop, with a test shoot being conducted for Parul's looks in the film.

After the launch of the other language versions, the team announced that they would film scenes in Gokarna, followed by schedules in Paris, Barcelona and London.

=== Post-production ===
Elli AvRam lent her own voice in Kannada for first time despite not knowing Kannada language, simultaneously with Tamil.

== Soundtrack ==
The soundtrack was composed by Amit Trivedi with lyrics by Yograj Bhat and Jayanth Kaikini. Bollywood actor Amitabh Bachchan lent his voice for a song, marking his first playback singing in South Indian cinema.

Track listing
No.	Title	Lyrics	Artist(s)	Length
1.	"Nale Namma Manelondu"	Yograj Bhat	Jassie Gift, Ananya Bhat	3:35
2.	"Mella Kai Hididu"	Jayanth Kaikini	Supriya Lohith, Sathya Prakash	3:53
3.	"Khuddagi Bhoomiyinda"	Jayanth Kaikini	Sunidhi Chauhan	4:09
4.	"Manasu Eegaithu"		Nikhita Gandhi, Jonita Gandhi	3:40
5.	"Chandulli Cheluve"		Amitabh Bachchan, Vijay Prakash, Master Hirannaiah, Shashaa Tirupati
