= 60th Filmfare Awards =

2015 awards for Hindi cinema

- 60th Filmfare Awards
- Date: 31 January 2015
- Site: Yash Raj Studio, Mumbai
- Hosted by: Karan Johar; Kapil Sharma; Arjun Kapoor; Alia Bhatt
- Official website: www.filmfare.com

Highlights
- Best Film: Queen
- Critics Award for Best Film: Ankhon Dekhi
- Most awards: Queen (6)
- Most nominations: Queen (13)

Television coverage
- Network: Sony Entertainment Television (India)

The 60th Filmfare Awards were held to honour the best films of 2014 from the Hindi-language film industry. The ceremony was hosted by Karan Johar, Alia Bhatt and Kapil Sharma and took place on 31 January 2015 at the Yash Raj Studio in Mumbai.

Queen led the ceremony with 13 nominations, followed by Haider and Highway with 9 nominations each.

Queen won 6 awards, including Best Film, Best Director (for Vikas Bahl) and Best Actress (for Kangana Ranaut), thus becoming the most-awarded film at the ceremony.

Haider was the runner-up of the ceremony with 5 awards, including Best Actor (for Shahid Kapoor), Best Supporting Actor (for Kay Kay Menon) and Best Supporting Actress (for Tabu).

== Winners and nominees ==
The nominations were announced on 19 January 2015.

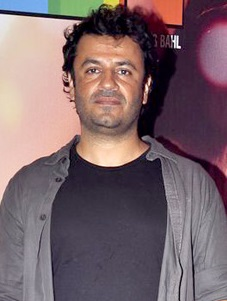
Vikas Bahl, Best Director

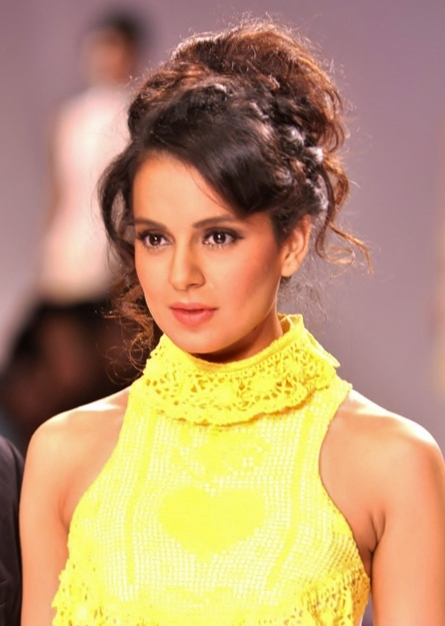
Kangana Ranaut, Best Actress

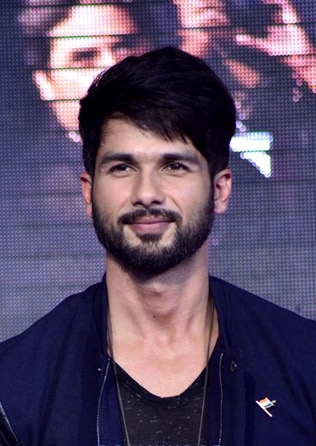
Shahid Kapoor, Best Actor

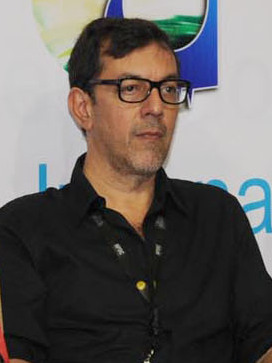
Rajat Kapoor, Best Director Critics

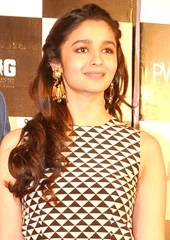
Alia Bhatt, Best Actress Critics

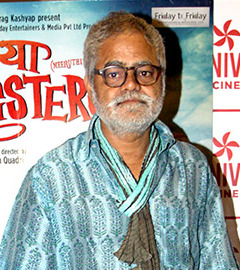
Sanjay Mishra, Best Actor Critics

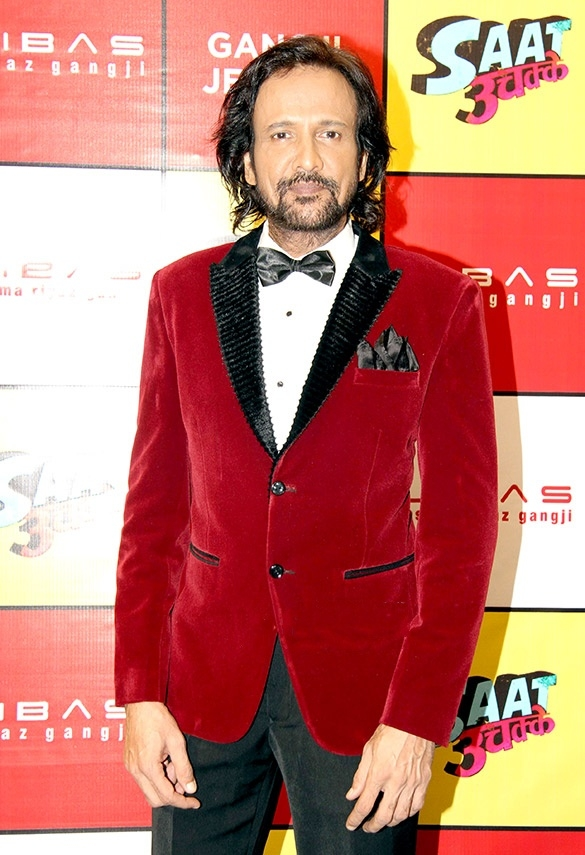
Kay Kay Menon, Best Supporting Actor

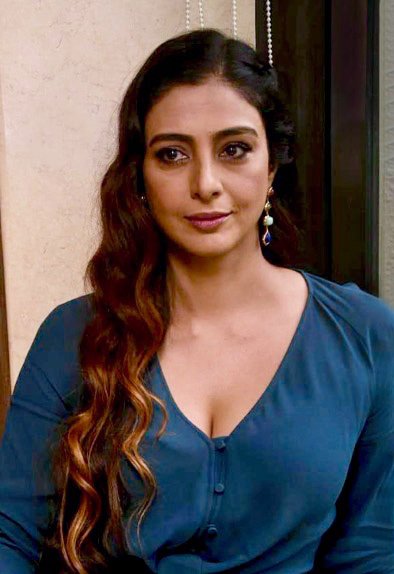
Tabu, Best Supporting Actress

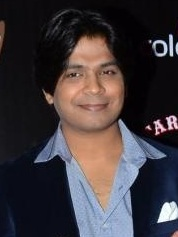
Ankit Tiwari, Best Male Playback Singer

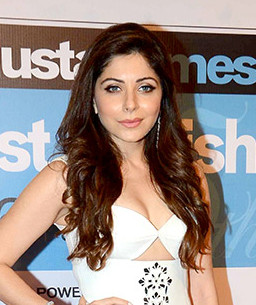
Kanika Kapoor, Best Female Playback Singer

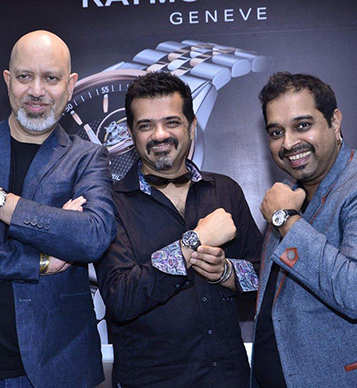
Shankar–Ehsaan–Loy, Best Music Director

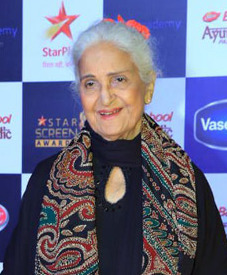
Kamini Kaushal, Lifetime Achievement Awardee

Best Film	Best Director
Queen – Anurag Kashyap, Vikramaditya Motwane; 2 States – Karan Johar, Sajid Nadiadwala; Haider – Vishal Bharadwaj, Siddharth Roy Kapoor; Mary Kom – Sanjay Leela Bhansali; PK – Rajkumar Hirani, Vidhu Vinod Chopra	Vikas Bahl – Queen; Abhishek Varman – 2 States; Anurag Kashyap – Ugly; Rajkumar Hirani – PK; Vishal Bhardwaj – Haider
Best Actor	Best Actress
Shahid Kapoor – Haider as Haider Meer; Aamir Khan – PK as PK; Akshay Kumar – Holiday: A Soldier Is Never Off Duty as Virat Bakshi; Hrithik Roshan – Bang Bang! as Rajveer / Jai Nanda; Randeep Hooda – Rang Rasiya as Raja Ravi Varma	Kangana Ranaut – Queen as Rani Mehra; Alia Bhatt – Highway as Veera Tripathi; Madhuri Dixit – Dedh Ishqiya as Begum Para; Priyanka Chopra – Mary Kom as Mary Kom; Rani Mukerji – Mardaani as Shivani Shivaji Roy; Sonam Kapoor – Khoobsurat as Dr. Mrinalini "Milli" Chakravarty
Best Supporting Actor	Best Supporting Actress
Kay Kay Menon – Haider as Khurram Meer; Abhishek Bachchan – Happy New Year as Nandu Bhide / Vicky Grover; Riteish Deshmukh – Ek Villain as Rakesh Mahadkar; Ronit Roy – 2 States as Vikram Malhotra; Tahir Raj Bhasin – Mardaani as Walt / Karan Rastogi	Tabu – Haider as Ghazala Meer; Amrita Singh – 2 States as Kavita Malhotra; Dimple Kapadia – Finding Fanny as Rosalina "Rosie" Eucharistica; Juhi Chawla – Gulaab Gang as Sumitra Devi; Lisa Haydon – Queen as Vijayalakshmi
Best Male Debut	Best Female Debut
Fawad Khan – Khoobsurat as Vikram Singh	Kriti Sanon – Heropanti as Dimple (Dimpy)
Best Music Director	Best Lyricist
Shankar–Ehsaan–Loy – 2 States; Amit Trivedi – Queen; Anupam Amod, Arko Pravo Mukherjee, Yo Yo Honey Singh, Mithoon, Pritam – Yaariyan; Himesh Reshammiya, Meet Bros Anjjan, Yo Yo Honey Singh – Kick; Mithoon, Ankit Tiwari, SOCH – Ek Villain	Rashmi Singh – "Muskurane" – CityLights; Amitabh Bhattacharya – "Zehnaseeb" – Hasee Toh Phasee; Gulzar – "Bismil" – Haider; Irshad Kamil – "Patakha Guddi" – Highway; Kausar Munir – "Suno Na Sangemarmar" – Youngistaan
Best Playback Singer – Male	Best Playback Singer – Female
Ankit Tiwari – "Galliyan" – Ek Villain; Arijit Singh – "Mast Magan" – 2 States; Arijit Singh – "Suno Na Sangemarmar" – Youngistaan; Benny Dayal – "Locha-E-Ulfat" – 2 States; Shekhar Ravjiani – "Zehnaseeb" – Hasee Toh Phasee	Kanika Kapoor – "Baby Doll" – Ragini MMS 2; Rekha Bhardwaj – "Hamari Atariya Pe" – Dedh Ishqiya; Jyoti Nooran, Sultana Nooran – "Patakha Guddi" – Highway; Shreya Ghoshal – "Manwa Laage" – Happy New Year; Sona Mohapatra – "Naina" – Khoobsurat

=== Critics' awards ===
Best Movie (Best Director)
Ankhon Dekhi – Rajat Kapoor
Best Actor	Best Actress
Sanjay Mishra – Ankhon Dekhi	Alia Bhatt – Highway

=== Technical awards ===
Best Story	Best Screenplay
Rajat Kapoor – Ankhon Dekhi; Anurag Kashyap – Ugly; Imtiaz Ali – Highway; Nitin Kakkar – Filmistaan; Rajkumar Hirani and Abhijat Joshi – PK	Rajkumar Hirani and Abhijat Joshi – PK; Anurag Kashyap, Akhilesh Jaiswal and Rohit Pandey – Ugly; Gopi Puthran, S Hussain Zaidi and Vibha Singh – Mardaani; Rajat Kapoor – Ankhon Dekhi; Vikas Bahl, Chaitally Parmar and Parveez Sheikh – Queen
Best Dialogue	Best Editing
Abhijat Joshi and Rajkumar Hirani – PK; Anurag Kashyap, Purva Naresh, Harshvardhan Kulkarni and Vinil Mathew – Hasee Toh Phasee; Anvita Dutt and Kangana Ranaut – Queen; Nitesh Tiwari, Piyush Gupta, Nikhil Mehrotra and Shreyas Jain – Bhoothnath Returns; Vishal Bhardwaj – Dedh Ishqiya	Abhijit Kokate and Anurag Kashyap – Queen; Aarti Bajaj – Highway; Aarti Bajaj – Ugly; Rajkumar Hirani – PK; Sanjib Datta – Mardaani
Best Choreography	Best Cinematography
Ahmed Khan for Jumme Ki Raat – Kick; Bosco-Caesar for Hungama Ho Gaya – Queen; Bosco-Caesar for Tu Meri – Bang Bang!; Bosco-Caesar for Tune Maari Entriyaan – Gunday; Ganesh Acharya for Whistle Baja – Heropanti	Bobby Singh and Siddharth Diwan – Queen; Anil Mehta – Finding Fanny; Anil Mehta – Highway; Artur Zurawski – Mardaani; K. U. Mohanan – Miss Lovely
Best Production Design	Best Sound Design
Subrata Chakraborty and Amit Ray – Haider; Ashim Ahluwalia, Tabasheer Zutsi and Parichit Paralkar – Miss Lovely; Manisha Khandelwal – Finding Fanny; Meenal Agarwal – Ankhon Dekhi; Subrata Chakraborty and Amit Ray – Dedh Ishqiya	Anilkumar Konakandlaand Prabal Pradhan – Mardaani; Mandar Kulkarni – Ugly; Resul Pookutty and Amrit Pritam – Highway; Sanjay Maurya and Allwyn Rego -Queen; Shajith Koyeri – Haider
Best Costume Design	Best Background Score
Dolly Ahluwalia – Haider; Anaita Shroff Adajania – Finding Fanny; Payal Saluja – Dedh Ishqiya; Rushi Sharma and Manoshi Nath – PK; Rushi Sharma and Manoshi Nath – Queen	Amit Trivedi – Queen; A. R. Rahman – Highway; Julius Packiam – Mardaani; Mathias Duplessey – Finding Fanny; Rohit Kulkarni – Mary Kom
Best Special Effects	Best Action
Not Awarded	Sham Kaushal – Gunday; Anal Arasu – Heropanti; Anal Arasu – Kick; Manoher Verma – Mardaani; Parvez Shaikh – Bang Bang!

=== Special awards ===
Lifetime Achievement Award
- Kamini Kaushal
Best Debut Director
- Abhishek Varman – 2 States

=== Multiple nominations ===
- Queen – 13
- Haider, Highway – 9
- 2 States, Mardaani, PK – 8
- Ankhon Dekhi, Dedh Ishqiya, Finding Fanny, Ugly – 5
- Bang Bang!, Ek Villain, Hasee Toh Phasee, Heropanti, Khoobsurat, Kick, Mary Kom – 3
- Gunday, Happy New Year, Miss Lovely, Youngistaan – 2

=== Multiple awards ===
- Queen – 6
- Haider – 5
- Ankhon Dekhi – 3
- PK – 2
