= That Is Mahalakshmi =

Unreleased Indian film

- Poster
- Directed by: Prasanth Varma
- Story by: Vikas Bahl
- Based on: Queen by Vikas Bahl
- Produced by: Manu Kumaran; Parul Yadav
- Starring: Tamannaah Bhatia
- Cinematography: Michael Taburiaux
- Edited by: Goutham Nerusu
- Music by: Amit Trivedi; Arjuna Harjai
- Production company: Mediente International Films Ltd.
- Country: India
- Language: Telugu

That Is Mahalakshmi is an unreleased Indian Telugu-language comedy drama film directed by Prasanth Varma, produced by Manu Kumaran and Parul Yadav. The film is a remake of the 2014 Hindi film Queen. The film stars Tamannaah Bhatia in the role, with Shibani Dandekar and Siddhu Jonnalagadda playing supporting roles. The film encountered problems at every stage, from production to distribution, resulting in numerous delays and ultimately preventing its release.

== Cast ==
- Tamannaah Bhatia as Mahalakshmi
- Shibani Dandekar as Vijayalakshmi
- Siddhu Jonnalagadda
- Geetanjali
- C. V. L. Narasimha Rao
- Guillermo Uria Viar
- Jeffrey Ho as Taka
- Nikos Vatikiotis
- Roopa Lakshmi
- Clifton Brown
- Samarth Ashok Hegde

== Production ==
In June 2014, Viacom18 Studios, the producers of the Hindi film Queen (2014), made an official announcement that they sold the remake rights for the Tamil, Telugu, Malayalam and Kannada versions of their film to Thiagarajan, who would make the films through his production studio, Staar Movies. Viacom put a caveat in the agreement that the principal photography of any of the films must start by 8 June 2017, else the rights would revert to Viacom. Soon after the announcement in June 2014, several Indian directors and actresses expressed their desire to do the film, but Thiagarajan maintained that no one had been finalised and that he was still considering his options. Thiagarajan announced his potential plans of casting Lisa Haydon to reprise her supporting role and for his son Prashanth to act in the film, but remarked that he was unsure if Prashanth would accept to play a character with "grey shades". Samantha Ruth Prabhu held discussions about portraying the film's lead role during July 2014, but turned the film down after being unconvinced about the way the original script was set to be adapted into the South Indian languages.

After a period of inactivity and further media reports about the casting of the lead actress, Thiagarajan revealed in February 2016 that he had signed on Revathi to direct the Tamil version of the film, while Suhasini Maniratnam would work as the dialogue writer. Soon after, Nayanthara turned down the opportunity to work on the film citing scheduling issues during early 2016. In mid-2016, Trisha Krishnan was also approached to play the lead role but conflicting schedules meant that she could not sign on to appear in the film. The media also linked actresses Parvathy and Nithya Menen to the lead role, but neither were signed on. During an interaction with the media in November 2016, Thiagarajan revealed that he had finalised Revathi to direct the Tamil and Malayalam versions of the film, while Anish Kuruvilla and Prakash Raj would make the Telugu and Kannada versions respectively. He added that Tamannaah Bhatia would feature in the lead role of the Tamil version, while Amala Paul and Parul Yadav would reprise the role in the Malayalam and Kannada versions respectively. He also stated that Amy Jackson was signed on to feature in all four versions of the film in the role originally portrayed by Lisa Haydon. In April 2017, Tamannaah stated that the film was shelved, though Thiagarajan refuted her claim and stated that production would begin in May 2017. He revealed that talks with the actress to play the lead role had fallen through after a dispute over her remuneration for the lead role.

In June 2017, further confusion about the remake arose after two separate production houses apart from Thiagarajan's Staar Movies had claimed rights to the film. As per a contract signed on 30 July 2016, Staar Movies agreed to enter into a co-production agreement with Mediente International Films Ltd and Liger Commercial Brokers for the making of the films. However a mutual cancellation form was then signed between the parties on 5 April 2017 after Mediente allegedly failed to pay the consideration provided under the agreement. Then, as per a contract signed on 21 April 2017, Staar Movies agreed to assign the rights of all four South Indian versions of Queen to Golden Crab Film Production Ltd. In order to avoid the reversion of rights back to Viacom due to three years of inactivity, Staar Movies and Golden Crab swiftly began shooting the film on 17 May 2017 with a series of supporting actors including Nassar under the title of Vaanil Thedi Nindren. However, on 3 June 2017, Staar Movies again assigned and transferred the remake rights of the film to Mediente and Liger, with the Kannada version of the film titled Butterfly featuring Parul Yadav, starting immediately with Ramesh Aravind taking over as director. Staar Movies then produced a declaration affidavit on 14 June 2017 that any agreement with Golden Crab Films was false.

Kajal Aggarwal revealed in August 2017 that she had agreed terms to play the lead role in the Tamil version of the film, which would also be directed by Ramesh Aravind and produced by Mediente, and that the film's shoot would begin in September 2017. In September 2017, it was revealed that Tamannaah would work on the Telugu version of the film which would be directed by Neelakanta. Amala Paul also opted out of the Malayalam version citing date issues and was later replaced by Manjima Mohan. Amy Jackson was initially in talks to play the role Lisa Haydon played in Queen however opted out due to unavailability of dates and creative differences. Filming began on 2 November 2017. Two months later, Neelakanta left the film, and was replaced by Prashanth Varma.

== Soundtrack ==
That Is Mahalakshmi

Soundtrack album by Amit Trivedi
- Released: 1 September 2020
- Recorded: 2018–19
- Studio: A T Studios
- Genre: Feature film soundtrack
- Label: Zee Music Company
- Producer: Amit Trivedi

Amit Trivedi chronology
Mission Mangal (2019)	That Is Mahalakshmi (2020)	Sye Raa Narasimha Reddy (2019)

The music of the film is composed by Amit Trivedi and lyrics are by Krishna Kanth. The songs were released under Zee Music Company on 1 September 2020.

Track listing
No.	Title	Lyrics	Singer(s)	Length
1.	"London Dhaka Dol"	Krishna Kanth	Geetha Madhuri	3:36
2.	"Katha Modalavake"	Krishna Kanth	Shreya Ghoshal, Sathyaprakash D	3:54
3.	"Sugar Honey"	Krishna Kanth	Benny Dayal, R Venkatraman (Rap)	3:36
4.	"Raathe Marindaa"	Krishna Kanth	Shashaa Tirupati, Amit Trivedi	4:40
5.	"Yes You Can"		Sunitha Sarathy	4:02
6.	"Sagame Chusaanaa"	Krishna Kanth	Nikhita Gandhi, Sameera Bharadwaj	3:41
7.	"Kallara Chusthunna"	Krishna Kanth	Anurag Kulkarni	3:53
Total length:				27:17

== See also ==
- Paris Paris
- Butterfly
- Zam Zam
