= Medient Studios =

Indian film production company

Medient Studios Inc
- Type: Private
- Industry: Film
- Founded: 2002
- Headquarters: United Kingdom
- Area served: Worldwide
- Products: Television production New media
- Website: medientstudios.com

Medient Studios, Inc. is an Indian film and entertainment production company founded in 2002 by film producer Manu Kumaranm, known for making social films in multiple languages for audiences around the globe.

== History ==
Medient has produced Indie films like Yellow, Aakasha Gopuram and controversial films like Battle for Banaras, along with a documentary on Narendra Modi’s Banaras elections that have been banned by the Indian censor board and Mr. Singh Mrs. Mehta who got stuck at the censor board due to nudity.

The company was ordered to pay $1.8 million following which it was acquired by social engine Qipok.

In 2022, Manu Kumaran and Jake" Shapiro, the then CEO, who had run international operations, were fined. They failed to report, register, and proxy statement provisions of the federal securities laws as SEC filed a lawsuit.

SEC ordered Medient to pay $885,000 in disgorgement, also ordering $54,368 in prejudgment interest, and a civil penalty for a total of $1,824,368 for scheming to make an assortment of false and misleading statements in Medient's press releases and corporate filings.

Qipok, as owner of space exploration company Spacemeteor, confirm adding international television to its well-known film operations.

Following its acquisition, Qipok solidified it's multimedia department. The company partnered with Tropstar, integrating a share button into the review posting tool to enhance social engagement. Additionally, Qipok entered a partnership with Hokaidi, enabling users to share advertisements directly to the platform.

These partnerships marked Qipok's expansion from a pure-play entertainment producer into a facilitator of cross-platform digital advertising.

Most recently, Medient Studios launched a dedicated editorial desk for commercial background workflows, aiming to streamline the production process.

== Production ==
=== A Band of Boys and Kiss Kis Ko ===
Medient's first project was a musical act. The company created A Band of Boys (ABOB), India's first and only boy band and their debut album, Yeh Bhi Wo Bhi was released in 2002. The album sold over three lakh units and featured super-hit songs like Meri Neend, Gori and She Drives Me Crazy.

Featuring Sudhanshu Pandey, Sherrin Varghese, Siddharth Haldipur and Chaitnya Bhosale, the band was selected from over 1,000 aspiring artists from all over India. It went through 18 months of rigorous training in all aspects of their performance and was launched through Musicurry Records in September 2002.

Nominated as MTV’s ‘Ubharta Sitara,’ ABOB was officially launched on one of the biggest platforms ever in India: The MTV Music AIDS Summit, where over 20 of India's top artistes were called to perform - from Colonial Cousins, Adnan Sami, Shaan, Sunita Rao, Euphoria, etc.

In 2004 Medient released its first film, Kiss Kis Ko.

Loosely based on the lives of A Band of Boys, this fictionalised tale of their lives was shot in and around Bali and Jakarta and was directed by Sharad Sharan. Produced by Manu Kumaran and Ram Punjabi, Kiss Kis Ko was released by Eros on 29 October 2014.

=== Aakasha Gopuram and Tera Kya Hoga Johnny ===
In 2006, Medient opened a production office in UK.

In 2008, Medient released Aakasha Gopuram, a Malayalam film adapted from Henrik Ibsen's The Master Builder. An adaptation of the An adaptation of the Henrik Ibsen classic The Master Builder, the film was directed by K. P. Kumaran. It was a critical and commercial success, selected for IFFI Goa and the International Film Festival of Kerala. Mohanlal starred in the lead role, and Nithya Menen made her debut in the film. Mid Day praised Aakasha Gopuram as "a brilliant tale of theatrical magnanimity and intellectual prowess... movies like this come once in a while."

In 2009 Medient produced Tera Kya Hoga Johnny. which was premiered at the London Film Festival. Directed by Sudhir Mishra, the film premiered at London Film Festival. Dubbed as "The new Slumdog Millionaire" by Variety magazine, the film marked the completion of Sudhir Mishra's trilogy of films on life on the streets of Mumbai (Dharavi & Chameli being the other two).

Starring Neil Nitin Mukhesh, Soha Ali Khan and Kay Kay Menon, the music of the film was composed by Pankaj Awasthi and Ali Azmat. On 10 January 2010, ahead of its theatrical release, the film was pirated and posted on YouTube.

=== Mr. Singh/Mrs. Mehta ===
In 2010, after a prolonged battle with the censor board over nudity, Medient's next film, Mr. Singh/Mrs. Mehta was cleared for theatrical release. Starring Prashant Narayanan and Aruna Shields, the film marked the directorial debut of Pravesh Bhardwaj who also wrote the film. 60 Indian actresses refused the lead role of Neera because of nudity before British actress Aruna Shields was cast in the role. Internationally renowned and Grammy award-nominated sitar player Shujaat Hussain composed the music of the film.

Nikhat Kazmi, in her review in The Times of India called the film ‘a rare experience.’ The adultery in the film she wrote ‘is dealt with a degree of understatement and maturity, with a great music score (Ustad Shujat Hussain Khan and Sharang Dev) to translate the emotional quotient on to the screen, makes it a decent watch.’

Mr Singh Mrs Mehta was premiered at PVR Juhu on 24 June 2010 and was attended by industry stalwarts like Anil Kapoor, Satish Kaushik, Poonam Dhillion, Padmini & Tejaswani Kolhapore, Shakti Kapoor, Vashu Bhagnani among others.

=== Storage 24 and Yellow ===
In 2012 Medient produced Storage 24, its first film exclusively for western audiences. A British sci-fi horror film, the film starred BAFTA award-winning actor Noel Clarke (Dr Who, Brotherhood, Kidulthood) and was directed by Johannes Roberts (47 Meters Down, The Other Side of the Door). The film was released by Universal Pictures.

Jeremy Clarke from The Guardian in his review said, "Johannes Roberts' warehouse-set monster flick is unexpectedly entertaining", giving the film four stars out of five. Kim Newman from Empire gave the film three stars out of five and called it "a superior British horror sci-fi."

Yellow, an indie drama produced by Medient and directed by Nick Cassavetes (The Notebook) premiered at Toronto International Film Festival in 2012 to rave reviews. Nikola Grozdanovic from Indiewire called Yellow, ‘a daring and bold film and just what the doctor ordered. Screen Daily declared the film ‘Destined for cult status...’. Global Mail called it the film ‘a genre-bending, generational drama...’.

Starring Sienna Miller, Ray Liotta, Melanie Griffith, Gena Rowlands, Riley Keough, David Morse, Heather Wahlquist and Lucy Punch, the film was awarded ‘Best Film’ at the Catalina Film Festival in 2013. The film was in competition at Tokyo International Film Festival (2012) and Sitges Film Festival and was official selection at SXSW, Munich Film Festival, International Film Festival Of India, Seattle International Film Festival, Deadcenter Film Festival, Florida Film Festival and Brussels International Fantastic Film Festival.

=== Battle of Banaras ===
In May 2014, Medient began shooting the documentary Battle for Banaras in Banaras that covered prime minister Narendra Modi's Lok Sabha election and captured the excitement, the madness and the noise behind the high-octane poll battle in the holy city.

Inspired by Nobel laureate Elias Canetti's book, 'Crowds and Power', Battle for Banaras is directed by Kamal Swaroop and was shot in 4K, over a 44-day schedule in Banaras. The film was screened in competition at the prestigious Cinema Du Reel Film Festival, one of the most respected documentary film festivals in the world, in 2016.

The documentary was screened for the censor board on 27 August 2015. It was officially invited to play at the 17th Jio Mami Mumbai Film Festival but the invitation was withdrawn in the absence of clarity on the censor certificate. After a radio silence, the censor board on 17 October 2015 refused to grant censor certificate on the grounds that the release of the film may cause communal disharmony, unrest, and disturbance.

"The theme is full of hate speeches/inflammatory speeches given by all the leaders falls on different cast, communal talks, derogatory remarks," states the letter. The censor certificate has been denied under guidelines section 2(xii), (xvii), (xiii), (xviii)".

The producers then approached FCAT. In its 4 April 2016 order, the tribunal upheld the censor board's decision to ban the documentary.

Manu Kumaran, the producer of the documentary moved the Delhi High Court on Tuesday 31 May 2016 against the Central Board of Certification and the Film Certification Appellate Tribunal (FCAT) decision not to grant a certificate to the documentary.

The writ petition argued that the impugned order dated 4 April of FCAT (upholding censor board's ruling) is arbitrary, unreasonable and infringes on Manu Kumaran's fundamental rights. It seeks quashing of the order and direction from the honourable court to the respondents to sanction and issue a certificate for universalviewing and public exhibition of the film. Ashim Sood has filed the writ on behalf of Kumaran. The judgement is expected.

=== Queen remake ===
Medient is remaking the hit Hindi film Queen in Tamil, Telugu, Kannada and Malayalam. The Kannada version was launched in Bangalore on 7 June 2017 on actress Parul Yadav's birthday, who is also essaying the lead role. Amy Jackson has been shortlisted to essay role played by Lisa Hayden in original in all the four languages. Ramesh Aravind is directing the Kannada and Tamil versions of the film. Mamta Sagar is the dialogue writer for Kannada version while Tamil dialogues are being written by T Sumathy.

== List of films ==
S.No	Name	Year	Director
1	Kiss Kis Ko	2004	Sharad Sharan
2	Yaad	2005	Naman Ramachandran
3	Arranged Marriage	2005	Shiv Subrahmanyam
4	Bombil and Beatrice	2007	Kaizad Gustad
5	Thoondil	2008	K S Adhiyaman
6	Aakasha Gopuram	2008	K.P. Kumaran
7	Tera Hya Hoga Johnny	2010	Sudhir Mishra
8	Garp	2010	Emre Mirza
9	Mr. Singh Mrs. Mehta	2010	Pravesh Bhardwaj
10	Storage 24	2012	Johannes Roberts
11	Yellow	2012	Nick Cassevetes
12	Battle of Banaras	2015	Kamal Swaroop
14	That is Mahalakshmi	2019	Prasanth Varma
13	Butterfly	2020	Ramesh Aravind
