= V (2020 film) =

2020 Indian Telugu-language action thriller film

- Release poster
- Directed by: Mohana Krishna Indraganti
- Written by: Mohana Krishna Indraganti
- Produced by: Dil Raju; Sirish; Lakshman; Harshith Reddy
- Starring: Nani; Sudheer Babu; Nivetha Thomas; Aditi Rao Hydari
- Cinematography: P. G. Vinda
- Edited by: Marthand K. Venkatesh
- Music by: Score: S. Thaman; Songs: Amit Trivedi
- Production company: Sri Venkateswara Creations
- Distributed by: Amazon Prime Video
- Release date: 5 September 2020
- Running time: 140 minutes
- Country: India
- Language: Telugu
- Budget: ₹25 crore

V is a 2020 Indian Telugu-language action thriller film directed by Mohana Krishna Indraganti and produced by Dil Raju under Sri Venkateswara Creations. The film stars Nani, Sudheer Babu, Nivetha Thomas, and Aditi Rao Hydari. The film, Nani's 25th as a lead actor, has him playing an antihero for the first time in his career. The film revolves around a decorated cop who tries to hunt down a serial killer.

Principal photography began in May 2019, after the film's official announcement, and was shot predominantly across Hyderabad, Mumbai and Thailand, before the shooting wrapped in January 2020. The film's score is composed by S. Thaman, with the soundtrack album being composed by Amit Trivedi. The cinematography is handled by P. G. Vinda and editing done by Marthand K. Venkatesh.

After a scheduled theatrical release of 25 March 2020, coinciding with Ugadi, was postponed indefinitely due to COVID-19 pandemic, V was released on Amazon Prime Video on 5 September 2020, thus becoming the first mainstream Telugu film to have a digital release. The film received mixed reviews from critics with praise for its cast performances (especially Nani and Sudheer Babu), soundtrack, and cinematography, but criticism for the script and pace. However, the film was the most watched Telugu film in a streaming platform in 2020. The film was released to theaters on 1 January 2021 following its digital release. Sudheer Babu won the Critics Choice Award for Best Actor – Telugu, at the 9th SIIMA award for his performance.

== Plot ==
DCP Aditya handles a communal riot in Hyderabad. He is awarded a gallantry medal a year later for solving various cases. The following night, Prasad, an Inspector, is grotesquely murdered by an unnamed killer who leaves a note challenging Aditya to catch him. Aditya suspects Apoorva, an aspiring crime novelist whom he met the previous night, to have some link with the killer as she was in contact with Prasad. However, Apoorva only met Prasad for her research, during which she overhears him telling a realtor named Mallikarjun that their lives are under threat.

Meanwhile, the killer calls Aditya, challenging him to prevent four more murders, failing which he shall give up his medals and resign. Aditya accepts the challenge. On deducing that the killer's name starts with "V", Aditya arrests a person named Vicky, based on the history between him and Prasad. Vicky tells Aditya about a man who enquired about Prasad and Mallik. On knowing that Mallik could be the next target, Aditya rushes to save him only to see that he is already killed. The killer, this time, leaves a clue hinting next location of the target. Aditya and Apoorva crack the clue, and Aditya heads to Mumbai.

The killer escapes narrowly, upon killing his target. He later sends Aditya an image of Aditya's school days, which makes Aditya suspect Vishnu, his fellow schoolmate and a popular student-athlete. He learns from his school in Vizag that Vishnu is an ex-INA soldier with an impeccable record of eliminating terrorists. Aditya visits a colleague of Vishnu who tells their past.

Past: Vishnu loved and married Saheba, whom he met when he was off-duty. However, when Saheba is pregnant, Vishnu, unable to get leave to visit her, was forced to attend his duty in Jammu and Kashmir. When Vishnu and his colleague are off to a mission, the bus in which they travel gets bombed and falls into an adjacent river. Vishnu is last seen being washed away. Saheba too is killed in the communal riots which Aditya handled, but there is no record of her death.

Present: Upon investigation, Aditya learns that Saheba was last seen going to a jewelry shop to buy a gift for Vishnu, who was supposed to return soon. Aditya tries to retrieve the shop's CCTV footage, but it is missing. Aditya suspects the manager and asks his team to follow him. They trace out a lady named Ramani, who reveals to them the conspiracy behind the riot. Ramani ran a girls hostel, but she would pimp the girls, often by force. One night, a girl finds her friend being raped and films the incident, where she takes the video to local don Sadik Hassan, whom she believes would help him. However, Sadik finds an opportunity to blackmail Home Minister Swami, whose son Ranjith is also behind the murders. Swami conspired to kill Sadik Hassan and retrieve the video.

Aditya, who learns that the people involved in the conspiracy are being killed, fails to protect the fourth target as well. Ranjith, the killer's final target, is in Thailand. Aditya travels to Thailand to save Ranjith, but Ranjith is beheaded by Vishnu, who leaves a note reading he shall meet soon. Later, Aditya resigns from his job, accepting his defeat. The police saves their face by blaming and killing an innocent pickpocketer named Vamsi, and the case is closed. Days later, Vishnu and Aditya meet, where Aditya reveals that he indeed helped Vishnu by killing Ranjith's guards, thus isolating him to be killed by Vishnu. He does so because his team is infiltrated on instruction to kill both Vishnu and Aditya.

Vishnu tells Aditya that Saheba, on the day of the riots, tried to save the girl with the video, only to be murdered by the goons. Vishnu, who was luckily saved after the accident, receives the video recorded and e-mailed by Saheba minutes before she was killed. He then decides to avenge her death. Vishnu initially believed that Aditya was also part of the conspiracy, but upon being impressed by his integrity, Vishnu hands over the video to Aditya to expose the criminals. Aditya later releases it to the press and regains his job. Days later, Apoorva writes a novel about the events, titled Saheba. Vishnu, who receives a copy, sees that it has been dedicated to V.

== Cast ==
- Nani as Major Yendluri Vishnu / V
- Sudheer Babu as DCP N. Aditya IPS
- Nivetha Thomas as Apoorva Ramanujan, Aditya’s love interest
- Aditi Rao Hydari as Saheba, Vishnu's Wife
- Vennela Kishore as Mansoor
- Tanikella Bharani as IG Y. V. Narendra
- Vijay Ethakota
- Naresh as Aditya's father
- Rohini as Sreelata, Apoorva's mother
- Thalaivasal Vijay as Ramanujan, Apoorva's father
- Jayaprakash as DGP T. Jayaraj
- Harish Uthaman as Ranjith
- Rajitha as Ramani
- Sunil as Muni Manikyam
- Sathyasai Srinivas as DCP B. Satyakumar
- Srikanth Iyyengar as Rashid
- Madhusudhan Rao as Mallikarjun
- Ravi Mariya as Bangaraju
- Vinay Varma as Sadik Haasan
- Adarsh Balakrishna as Sarath Chandra
- Rahul Ramakrishna as Harsha
- Raja Chembolu as Rathnakumar
- Ravi Varma as KK
- Bharath Reddy as Army Officer
- Ananda Chakrapani as Home Minister Swami
- Rajnish Sharma as Police Officer
- Raghu Babu as Bangaram
- Getup Srinu as Mahesh
- John Kottoly
- Ramana Bhargav
- Jabardast Ramprasad
- Vaibhavi Joshi as an item number in Ranga Rangeli

== Production ==
=== Development ===
Originally, Mohana Krishna Indraganti planned a sequel for his 2016 film Gentleman, with Nani and Sharwanand in the lead roles. In December 2018, Dulquer Salmaan was approached to star in the film soon after Sharwanand's exit, but, however, he could not act in the film due to prior commitments. Sudheer Babu was later confirmed to play a lead role, marking his second collaboration with Indraganti after Sammohanam (2018). In March 2019, sources claimed that Nani's film is not a sequel to Gentleman, but a neo-noir crime thriller with a fresh script. The actor was reported to play a character with negative shades, whereas Babu will be seen as a cop.

In March 2019, Aditi Rao Hydari signed to be a part of the lead cast. The film marked Hydari's second collaboration with Babu and Indraganti after Sammohanam. Nivetha Thomas' presence was confirmed in April 2019. Bollywood composer Amit Trivedi signed in to score music for the film, the very same month, marking his second Telugu film after Sye Raa Narasimha Reddy (2019). On 29 April 2019, the makers announced the titular poster of the film, being titled as V, also marking Nani's 25th film, featuring him in a negative role for the first time.

=== Filming ===
Principal photography of began in April 2019 while its second schedule started on 12 June 2019 with Babu and other artists. Babu allotted a call sheet of 30 days, for the second schedule. Nani started shooting for the film on 11 August 2019. In September 2019, filming location changed to Thailand where major scenes were shot with Babu and Nani, with the former being hurt while filming an action sequence. The makers shot few action sequences at a forest located at Phuket, which was wrapped up in October 2019. The shooting of the film was wrapped up in January 2020.

== Music ==
V

Soundtrack album by Amit Trivedi
- Released: 29 August 2020
- Recorded: 2019–2020
- Genre: Feature film soundtrack
- Length: 15:01
- Label: Aditya Music
- Producer: Amit Trivedi

Amit Trivedi chronology
Gunjan Saxena: The Kargil Girl (2019)	V (2020)	That is Mahalakshmi (2020)
External audio
- Audio Jukebox on YouTube

Singles from V
- 1. "Manasu Maree" Released: 24 February 2020; 2. "Vastunnaa Vachestunna" Released: 10 March 2020

The soundtrack album is composed by Amit Trivedi, in his third Telugu film after Sye Raa Narasimha Reddy (2019) and That is Mahalakshmi (2020), while the film score is composed by S. Thaman. The lyrics were written by Sirivennela Seetharama Sastry, Ramajogayya Sastry and Krishna Kanth. On 24 February 2020, coinciding with actor Nani's birthday, the first single "Manasu Maree" was released by Aditya Music. The second single "Vastunnaa Vachestunna" was released on 10 March 2020. The soundtrack album was released on 29 August 2020.

Track listing
No.	Title	Lyrics	Singer(s)	Length
1.	"Manasu Maree"	Sirivennela Seetharama Sastry	Amit Trivedi, Shashaa Tirupati, Yazin Nizar	4:28
2.	"Vastunnaa Vachestunna"	Sirivennela Seetharama Sastry	Shreya Ghoshal, Amit Trivedi, Anurag Kulkarni	3:32
3.	"Ranga Rangeli"	Ramajogayya Sastry	Yazin Nizar, Nikhita Gandhi	3:31
4.	"Baby Touch Me Now"	Krishna Kanth	Sharvi Yadav	3:31
Total length:				15:01

== Release ==
The film was initially scheduled to release on 25 March 2020 coinciding with Ugadi, but was postponed due to the COVID-19 lockdown in India. In June 2020, Nani refuted rumours of a direct release, through over-the-top media services, and confirmed that the film is scheduled for a theatrical release. In August 2020, the makers decided to release the film directly on a streaming platform, after the uncertainty over the reopening of theatres, which were closed due to the lockdown.

On 20 August, the makers officially announced that the film would be released through Amazon Prime Video on 5 September 2020. The release date coincided with Nani's debut in the film industry, after his 2008 film Ashta Chamma, which is also directed by Mohana Krishna Indraganti. The film became one of the first major Telugu films, to be released directly on a streaming platform.

Amazon Prime Video premiered the film eventually on 4 September, ahead of the scheduled release date, and it was dubbed in Tamil, Malayalam and Kannada, which had a release on the same day. The makers re-released the film in theatres on 1 January 2021, coinciding with New Year's Day. The Hindi dubbed version began streaming on Prime Video from 4 April 2021.

== Reception ==
Sangeetha Devi Dundoo of The Hindu, wrote that "V could have benefited with a far more engaging story. As it stands now, it’s a pale story that doesn’t make you root for its prime characters." Hemanth Kumar of the Firstpost, who rated the film 2.5 out of five, also noted "V is a Telugu film, and if a top star is portrayed as an anti-hero, he cannot be a diabolical person at any cost." Haricharan Pudipeddi of The Hindustan Times reviewed "V is a major misfire from Indraganti, whose intent to go big fails gloriously. For Nani, who had bet a lot on this film, it will go down as a big disappointment. If only Nani took some inspiration in storytelling from his last production venture, HIT, a gripping investigative thriller, V could have been a far better film."

Manoj Kumar of The Indian Express granted the film 2.5 stars out of five and wrote, "Indraganti has gone the extra mile while writing scenes for Vishnu...However, Mohana doesn’t show an equal amount of love for other key characters", and gave a verdict "V is not the popcorn movie that we deserve but the one we need right now." Janaki K. of India Today who also rated 2.5 out of five, wrote that "Director Mohan Krishna Indraganti’s V had a solid premise that could have been made into a slick thriller. With shortcomings in the screenplay, V doesn’t excite you as it intended to. Nonetheless, certain moments will make it an interesting watch."

Neetishta Nyayapati of The Times of India, gave 3 out of 5 and wrote, "Mohan Krishna Indraganti takes a gamble and tries to show that he can do more than make feel-good dramas. And the film he shows, despite the predictability, definitely has the potential to be more. If only it rose beyond the usual tropes. This is not an unwatchable film by any measure, because it definitely has its moments that will make you want to know what comes next." Gauthaman Bhaskaran of News18 gave the film 1.5 out of 5 stating, "The film lacks a thoughtful approach on the director's part. In its runtime of 140-minutes, V hardly offers anything to look forward to." Baradwaj Rangan of Film Companion wrote "This super-predictable film, like V's cigarettes, is a hash. It’s a movie about murders that’s impossible to take seriously. It’s a comedy of terrors." Sify gave the film 3 out of 5 and stated "V is a revenge drama that has weak writing. Clichéd and predictable later portions have marred the mood."

== Legal issues ==
On 2 March 2021, the Bombay High Court ordered Amazon Prime Video to take down all versions of the film until they removed the image of Mumbai-based actress Sakshi Malik used without her consent. On 4 March 2021, the court allowed the film's re-release after Malik confirmed that the deletion was satisfactory.

== Accolades ==
Award (Note: Awards, festivals and organizations are in alphabetical order.)	Date of ceremony (Note: Date is linked to the article about the awards held that year, wherever possible.)	Category	Recipient(s)	Result	Ref.
South Indian International Movie Awards	11–12 September 2021	Best Director – Telugu	Mohana Krishna Indraganti	Nominated	
South Indian International Movie Awards	11–12 September 2021	Best Actor – Telugu	Sudheer Babu	Nominated	
South Indian International Movie Awards	11–12 September 2021	Best Actor (Critics Choice) – Telugu	Sudheer Babu	Won	
South Indian International Movie Awards	11–12 September 2021	Best Actor in a Negative Role – Telugu	Nani	Nominated	
South Indian International Movie Awards	11–12 September 2021	Best Music Director – Telugu	Amit Trivedi	Nominated	
South Indian International Movie Awards	11–12 September 2021	Best Cinematographer – Telugu	P. G. Vinda	Nominated	
South Indian International Movie Awards	11–12 September 2021	Best Female Playback Singer (Telugu)	Shreya Ghoshal	Nominated	
