= Zam Zam (film) =

Unreleased Indian film

- Zam Zam
- Directed by: Neelakanta
- Story by: Vikas Bahl
- Based on: Queen by Vikas Bahl
- Produced by: Manu Kumaran
- Starring: Manjima Mohan; Shibani Dandekar; Sunny Wayne; Muthumani; Baiju
- Cinematography: Michael Taburiaux
- Edited by: Pradeep Shankar
- Music by: Amit Trivedi
- Production companies: Mediente International Films Ltd; Liger Commercial Brokers
- Country: India
- Language: Malayalam

Zam Zam is an unreleased Indian Malayalam-language comedy drama film directed by Neelakanta, produced by Manu Kumaran and bankrolled by Taizoon Khorakiwala. The film is a remake of the 2014 Hindi film Queen by Vikas Bahl and features Manjima Mohan reprising Kangana's role.

== Cast ==
- Manjima Mohan as Zama Nazreen
- Shibani Dandekar as Zama Farzil
- Sunny Wayne as Captain Bijumon
- Muthumani as Kavitha Karthiyayeni
- Baiju as Chackochan Nair

== Production ==
In June 2014, Viacom 18 Motion Pictures, the producers of the Hindi film Queen (2014), made an official announcement that they had sold the remake rights for the Tamil, Telugu, Malayalam and Kannada versions of their film to Thiagarajan, who would make the films through his production studio, Staar Movies. Viacom put a caveat in the agreement that the principal photography of any of the films must start by 8 June 2017, else the rights would revert to Viacom.

=== Casting ===
Initially, Amala Paul signed on to play the lead role, but she was replaced by Manjima Mohan.

== Soundtrack ==
Zam Zam

Soundtrack album by Amit Trivedi
- Released: 5 February 2019
- Recorded: 2018–19
- Studio: A T Studios
- Genre: Feature film soundtrack
- Label: Zee Music Company
- Producer: Amit Trivedi

Amit Trivedi chronology
Paris Paris (2019)	Zam Zam (2019)	Sye Raa Narasimha Reddy (soundtrack) (2019)

The music of the film is composed by Amit Trivedi and lyrics are by Rafeeq Ahamed.

Track listing
No.	Title	Lyrics	Music	Singer(s)	Length
1.	"Kili Penne" (Backing Vocals: Rajiv Sundaresan, Suhas Sawan and Arun HK)	Rafeeq Ahammed	Amit Triedi	Jassie Gift and Sithara Krishnakumar	3:31
2.	"Ini Vida Parayaam"	Rafeeq Ahamed	Amit Trivedi	Gowry Lekshmi and Sathyaprakash	3:53

== See also ==
- That Is Mahalakshmi
- Paris Paris
- Butterfly
