= Elli AvrRam =

Swedish-Greek actress (born 1990)

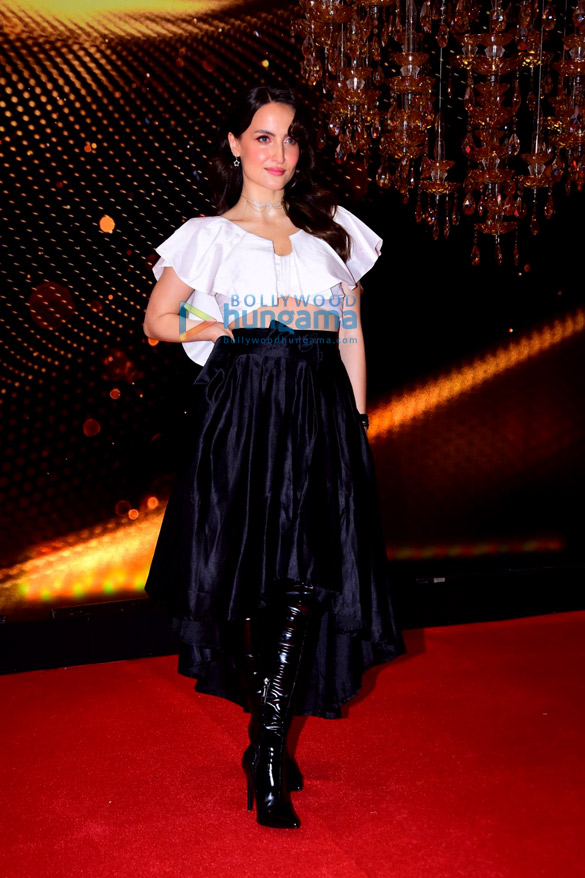
- Elli AvrRam in 2022
- Born: Elisabet Avramidou Granlund; 29 July 1990 (age 36); Stockholm, Sweden
- Citizenship: Sweden; Greece
- Occupation: Actress
- Years active: 2008–present

Elisabet Avramidou Granlund (born 29 July 1990), known professionally as Elli AvrRam, is a Swedish-Greek actress based in Mumbai, India. She is known for her Hindi film Kis Kisko Pyaar Karoon. AvrRam came to prominence after participating in the Indian reality TV show Bigg Boss in 2013. Elli along with Aamir Khan had a special appearance in the Koi Jaane Na film song "Har Funn Maula".

== Early life ==
Elli was born in Stockholm, Sweden. She grew up in Tyresö kommun, Stockholm. Her Greek father, Jannis Avramidis, is a musician who is now settled in Sweden; and her Swedish mother, Maria Granlund, is an actress who had a part in Ingmar Bergman's Fanny and Alexander. AvrRam took an interest in figure skating, singing and dancing from her initial years. AvrRam received training in acting from her mother and aunt who runs a theatre in Skåne County, Sweden. AvrRam felt a connection to India since her childhood. In an interview with the local Stockholm newspaper Mitt i, she said, "Even when I was five, I was fascinated by Indian dance and the colourful clothes." Since her father is a Greek musician, she found some Greek songs are related to Indian melodies. AvrRam dreamt of being a Bollywood actress since her adolescence. She would go to a video store in Stockholm that used to sell Hindi movies and she would buy Bollywood films from there. She also used to watch Hindi films on YouTube.

== Career ==
At 17, AvrRam became a member of the Stockholm-based Pardesi Dance Group, and gave dance performances, primarily on Bollywood songs.

AvrRam has done some acting projects in Sweden, the most noticeable of them is the December 2008 crime drama romance film, Förbjuden Frukt, where she played the role of Selen – the lead character's teen girlfriend. The film is set against the backdrop of violent crime, where she falls in love with a boy with a criminal past.

In 2010, AvrRam participated in Miss Greece beauty contest. She also appeared on the Swedish TV-show Gomorron Sverige.

In September 2012, AvrRam moved to Mumbai on a tourist visa to pursue an acting career in Bollywood. About the decision of acting in Hindi movies, she expressed in an interview with N Magazine, "[When] I was 14, I had a TV in my room and watched Devdas which is almost four hours long. I didn't move the entire time. I thought, 'Wow, I want to act and dance like that. I have to do Bollywood movies.'" She signed up with a modelling agency and soon got a work visa. The agency helped her getting auditions. The first considerable project she managed to get was a TV commercial for Eveready Industries India with the leading Indian actor Akshay Kumar.

She eventually got her first major breakthrough by bagging a lead role in Saurabh Varma's comedy thriller film Mickey Virus. AvrRam recollected, "The photographer who took pictures of me knew a director who was looking for a girl for a lead role. I called him and had come to audition for his film." She disclosed, "Before I auditioned for Mickey Virus, I asked director to send me the script so I could memorize the words, because I didn't know Hindi yet. I was sent four pages of dialogue and there was no one who could tell me how to pronounce certain words. At the audition they liked my acting but the accent wasn't right." She was shortlisted along with 200 other hopefuls and managed to beat others. AvrRam revealed in an interview, "When I told the director that mum worked with Ingmar Bergman, he gave a strong reaction: 'What!? Has she worked with Bergman?' They were incredibly impressed." For her Bollywood launch, AvrRam has taken formal training in dance form and Hindi pronunciation. In this film she plays the role of Kamayani George, the love interest of the character Mickey Virus, played Manish Paul, who is a popular TV host and is making his debut in film industry. The film, shot in Delhi, released on 25 October 2013.

The first Swedish actress to act in Bollywood, AvrRam has been noted for looks very similar to the actress Katrina Kaif.

In 2013, AvrRam participated as a contestant on an Indian reality TV show, Bigg Boss 7, where celebrities from various walks of life live together in a large house, completely cut off from the outside world. They try to avoid being evicted every week by public votes, with the aim of prize money at the end. The show, based on Dutch-based Endemol's Big Brother, went on air in September 2013 and is hosted by the actor Salman Khan. After spending ten weeks on the show, she got evicted in November 2013. AvrRam said in an interview with PTI, "I did not come to Bigg Boss for money or fame but with the agenda to have fun. This show has helped me become a household name. I am very humbled by the appreciation I have received from audiences and will cherish this experience for years to come."

In October 2013, colleges in Chandigarh reportedly banned the students from possessing or displaying posters of AvrRam in the campus and dormitories as the college authorities considered her images inappropriate.

In 2014, Elli appeared as a guest contestant in Colors TV's dance reality show Jhalak Dikhhla Jaa in its seventh season for the teen ka tadka special week along with Sophie Choudry.

In 2015, her third film, Kis Kisko Pyaar Karoon released in September. The film received good reviews and was a success at the box office. In 2017, she appeared in two films Naam Shabana and Poster Boys. She later presented the reality show The Great Indian Laughter Challenge.

In 2018, appeared in the film Baazaar in the song "Billionaire" along with Rohan Mehra and Saif Ali Khan. While the film failed at the box office, the song got good reviews.

AvrRam performed a dance act on the song "Chamma Chamma" for the film Fraud Saiyaan. The special song, was released in December 2018 by Tips Industries and gained over 15 million YouTube views in just three days of its release. Despite popularity of song, film was flopped in box-office At the song launch event, AvrRam said, "I signed up for this dance song because it's such an iconic thing to get to be part of the recreation of it." She appeared in another song "Zila Hilela" along with Sidharth Malhotra in Ekta Kapoor's movie Jabariya Jodi.

In March 2019, she appeared in a music video called, Haaye Oye, released by Sony Music India. In 2020, she acted in the film Malang playing the role of Jesse. In 2021, she made her Tamil debut with the film Naane Varuvean opposite Dhanush. Her special dance number "Har Funn Maula" with Aamir Khan got more than 90 million views on YouTube. In recent work, Elli has also starred in the 2025 music video for "Zaar Zaar" by Rusha & Blizza feat. Farhan Khan getting more than 6.2 million views as the lead dancer.

== Filmography ==
Key
†	Denotes films that have not yet been released

=== Movies ===
Year	Name	Role	Language	Notes
2013	Mickey Virus	Kamayani aka Kate George	Hindi	
2015	Kis Kisko Pyaar Karoon	Deepika "Deepu" Kothari	Hindi	
2019	Fraud Saiyaan	Chandani (item number "Chamma Chamma")	Hindi	
2019	Jabariya Jodi	Dancer in the song 'Zila Hilela'	Hindi	
2019	Perspective	Beautiful Woman	English	Short film
2020	Malang	Jessabelle a.k.a. Jessie	Hindi	
2021	Koi Jaane Na	Item dance in the song "Har Funn Maula"	Hindi	
2021	With You - Backar du så backar jag	Lilly	Swedish	Short film
2022	Naane Varuvean	Madhuri	Tamil	
2022	Goodbye	Daisy Bhalla	Hindi	
2023	Ganapath	Dimple Bajwa	Hindi	
2023	Conjuring Kannappan	Dr. Magdalene Ellis	Tamil	
2025	Ilu Ilu 1998	Ms. Pinto	Marathi	
2025	Be Happy	Herself	Hindi	cameo appearance
TBA	Butterfly	Vijaylakshmi	Kannada	Unreleased
TBA	Paris Paris	Rajalakshmi	Tamil	Unreleased

=== Television ===
Year	Name	Role	Notes	Ref.
2013	Bigg Boss 7	Contestant	10th place	
2014	Jhalak Dikhhla Jaa 7	Contestant	Appeared in teen ka tadka special	
2016	Box Cricket League 2	Contestant		
2017	The Great Indian Laughter Challenge	Host		

=== Web series ===
Year	Name	Role	Ref.
2019	The Verdict – State vs Nanavati	Sylvia Nanavati	
2019	Typewriter	Anita	
2019	Inside Edge 2	Sandy	
2025	Ekaki	Voice Cameo in Episode 3	
