= Parvathy (lyricist) =

Indian lyricist working on Tamil language films

Parvathy Meera
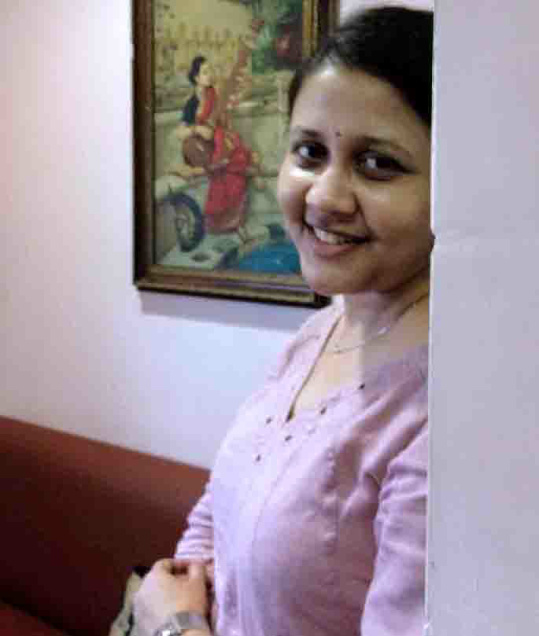
- Parvathy Meera
- Born: Chennai, Tamil Nadu, India
- Occupations: Poet, lyricist
- Years active: 2014–present

Parvathy Meera is an Indian lyricist working on Tamil language films. She donned various roles in the media before entering the film industry where she earned the tag 'multi-faceted'.

== Early life ==
Meera finished her higher secondary of schooling from Adarsh Vidyalaya, Chennai. Later she pursued B.A and M.A English Literature in Ethiraj College For Women. Due to her interest in the media, she did an MPhil in Mass Communication from Mother Teresa University.

== Career ==
She worked as an avant garde theatre artiste working mainly with journalist-political commentator Gnani's theatre group Pareeksha. Her last performance as a theatre artiste was in SLATE's production Anniyan, an adaptation of Albert Camus' immortal novel 'L'Étranger.'

She then stopped doing theatre, but she worked on short films including one for TANSACS and a feature film for Dhan Foundation in which she shared screen space with Chinnapillai Ammal. She played the protagonist in all of them.

Meera was an anchor for Podhigai TV for more than 5 years for the programmes Ennai Kavarndhavargal and Nam Virundhinar. During this time, she interviewed personalities, including writer Ponneelan, former Vice Chancellor of Madras University Shri. Thiruvasagam and the family members of Kothamangalam Subbu, earning kudos for her interviewing skills, spontaneity, vocabulary and diction, particularly from her subjects. She is skilled at spoken and written English and Tamil which helped in advancing her interviewing skills. Meera's three songs led to a nomination for best upcoming lyricist at the 2014 Mirchi Music Awards.

== Poetry ==
She has released four anthologies of Tamil poetry: Ippadikku Naanum Natpum, Idhu Vaeru Mazhai, Andha Moonru Naatkal and Ivan Iyarpeyar Isai Illai . After her second book of poetry, she returned to the film industry as a lyricist.

== Films ==
Parvathy Meera made her debut in films with Jilla (2014). She signed to write for Vallinam first, Jilla was her first release. She followed up the superhit song in Jilla with Thirumanam enum Nikkah and other films. After lyricist Thamarai, she was the next female lyricist to have written for a top hero. This happened in her first film, rare in a male-dominated industry.

Her screen name was Parvathy in her earlier films, but in October 2022, she announced that she would henceforth be credited as Parvathy Meera. She also mentioned that she added her mother's name Meera as her surname in order to honour her.

=== As a lyricist ===
Year	Film	Songs	Award	
2014	Jilla	Verasa Pogaiyilae	Nomination by Mirchi Award as Upcoming Lyricist	
2014	Vallinam	Nakula		
2014	Thirumanam Enum Nikkah	Kannukkul Pothivaippen, Yaaro Ival	Nomination by Mirchi Award as Upcoming Lyricist - Kannukkul Pothivaippaen song	
2014	Amara Kaaviyam	Edhedho Ennam Vandhu	Nomination by Mirchi Award as Upcoming Lyricist	
2016	Kalam	Puthu Puthu		
2017	Adhe Kangal	Ponapokkil		
2018	Adangathey	Nilathil Nadakkum		
2019	Paris Paris	Odhukka Nenacha, Iduva En Bhoomi		
2019	Iyakkunar Sigaram	Short film		
2020	Seeru	Sevvanthiye, VaasanaPoochenda		
2020	August 16 1947	Kandom Sodhanthiram		
2022	Samarapoori	Maruthaani poo Meetturaale	Srilankan Telefilm	Shakthi TV
2024	Brother	Amudha Amudha		
2024	Brother	Medhakuthu Kaalu Rendum		
2024	Petta Rap	Pogaathey		
