= Petta Rap =

Indian musical film

- Theatrical release poster
- Directed by: S. J. Sinu
- Written by: Dinil P. K
- Produced by: Jobi. P. Sam
- Starring: Prabhu Deva; Vedhika; Bagavathi Perumal; Ramesh Thilak; Vivek Prasanna
- Cinematography: Jithu Damodar
- Edited by: Nishad Yusuf
- Music by: D. Imman
- Production companies: Blue Hill Films; Blue Hill Nael Communication
- Release date: 27 September 2024
- Running time: 123 minutes
- Country: India
- Language: Tamil

Petta Rap (transl. Hood rap) is a 2024 Indian Tamil-language musical action comedy film directed by S. J. Sinu and produced by Jobi. P. Sam. The film stars Prabhu Deva and Vedhika, alongside Bagavathi Perumal, Ramesh Thilak and Vivek Prasanna. The music was composed by D. Imman, while cinematography and editing were handled by Jithu Damodar and Nishad Yusuf.

Petta Rap released in theatres worldwide on 27 September 2024 to mixed-to-negative reviews from critics and audiences alike, eventually becoming a box-office disappointment.

== Plot ==
Bala is a middle-class young man with dreams larger than his reality. Working as a junior artist in Tamil cinema, he aspires to become a major action hero, inspired since childhood by legendary stars and their iconic performances. His life revolves around this dream, but circumstances constantly test his resolve.

Parallel to Bala’s struggles is Janaki, also known as Jeni, his former classmate who once harbored feelings for him. After a heartbreak caused by Bala’s unrequited love, she reinvents herself and emerges as a successful pop singer. Fate reunites them years later under dramatic circumstances when Jeni accidentally injures the brother of a powerful gangster while defending herself. At the same time, Bala collides with the gangster’s car, sparking a violent confrontation that he miraculously survives, demonstrating his courage and resilience.

Despite his bravery, Bala’s life begins to unravel. He loses key industry opportunities after clashing with a film’s lead actor on set and is subsequently blacklisted. Feeling the weight of failure, he contemplates ending his life but decides instead to live one last time with reckless abandon, selling family heirlooms to fund a final spree.

In the midst of this turmoil, Bala encounters Jeni again at a wedding reception. Their reunion reignites old emotions and memories, forcing both of them to confront the choices that shaped their lives. The film follows Bala’s journey as he struggles with despair, rediscovers his passion through dance and music, and seeks redemption.

The narrative moves between past and present, tracing Bala and Jeni’s shared history, their separation, and the challenges they face in pursuing love and ambition. Throughout the story, Bala grapples with his failures, rekindles his dreams, and ultimately confronts the possibility of hope and new beginnings.

== Cast ==
- Prabhu Deva in dual role as
  - Balasubramaniam
  - Himself (cameo appearance)
- Vedhika as Janaki
- Bagavathi Perumal as Kamal
- Ramesh Thilakas Balu's friend
- Vivek Prasanna as Balu's friend
- Jayaprakash as Bala's father
- Riyaz Khan as Veeramani
- Mime Gopi as King Kumar
- Kalabhavan Shajohn as Kasimedu Michael
- Rajeev Pillai as Guna
- Vaiyapuri as Janaki's uncle
- Thalapathy Dinesh as Fight Master (cameo appearance)
- Perarasu as Himself (cameo appearance)
- Kala Master as Herself (cameo appearance)
- Sridhar as Himself (cameo appearance)
- Sunny Leone as special appearance in song "Vechi Seyyuthey"

== Production ==
S. J. Sinu, known for films like Djibouti (2021) and Theru (2023) announced his Tamil directorial debut with Prabhu Deva and Vedhika in lead roles. The makers also signed Sunny Leone in a cameo appearance. The film started filming on 15 June 2023 at Puducherry and was wrapped up on 21 February 2024. The film was titled Petta Rap which carries the tagline Sing, Action, Dance Repeat. The film's title is inspired by a song from Prabhu Deva's 1994 film Kaadhalan, in which the music was composed by A. R. Rahman. The song has been remixed for this film.

== Soundtrack ==
Petta Rap

Soundtrack album by D. Imman
- Released: 8 March 2023
- Recorded: 2023
- Genre: Feature film soundtrack
- Length: 23:39
- Language: Tamil
- Label: T-Series

D. Imman chronology
Teenz (2024)	Petta Rap (2024)	Baby and Baby (2025)

The soundtrack is composed by D. Imman, which consists of 9 songs. The first single "Athirattum Dum" was released on 5 July 2024, while the second single "Aaraathi Aaraathi" was released on 17 July 2024.

Track listing
No.	Title	Lyrics	Singer(s)	Length
1.	"Athirattum Dum (Happy Wedding)"	Viveka	D.Imman; Deepthi Suresh	3:53
2.	"Aaraathi Aaraathi"	Mani Amudhavan	Pavithra Chari	2:26
3.	"Dance Dance"	D.Imman	D.Imman	2:16
4.	"Fly Higher"	Madhan Karky	Tanya Shanker	2:22
5.	"Lika Lika"	Madhan Karky	Nikhita Gandhi; Yazin Nizar	4:56
6.	"Pogaathey"	Parvathy Meera	Shweta Mohan	4:17
7.	"Random Groove- Music Theme"			0:32
8.	"Vechi Seyyuthey"	Viveka	Neha Bhasin, Mc Rude	3:49
9.	"You Are My Hero"	Viveka	Manoj Krishna	4:17
Total length:				23:39

== Reception ==
Narayani M of Cinema Express rated the film 1.5/5 stars and wrote "Just like how Bala crashes into a random wedding after drinking like a fish, Petta Rap too takes illogical detours that bring no value to the story." Thinkal Menon of The Times of India rated 2/5 stars and wrote "Petta Rap leaves you wondering how its makers depended only on Prabhu Deva's dance and reference to Kaadhalan to pull off a mediocre story and unengaging screenplay."
