= Yellow (2012 film) =

- Directed by: Nick Cassavetes
- Written by: Nick Cassavetes; Heather Wahlquist
- Produced by: Manu Kumaran; Chris Hanley; Jordan Gertner; Chuck Pacheco
- Starring: Heather Wahlquist; Riley Keough; Sienna Miller; David Morse; Ray Liotta; Melanie Griffith; Lucy Punch
- Cinematography: Jeff Cutter
- Edited by: Jim Flynn
- Music by: Aaron Zigman
- Production companies: Medient Studios; A-Mark Entertainment; Indion Entertainment Group; Muse Productions
- Distributed by: Medient Studios
- Release dates: September 8, 2012 (TIFF); August 29, 2014 (United States)
- Running time: 105 minutes
- Country: United States
- Language: English

Yellow is a 2012 American drama film directed by Nick Cassavetes and written by Cassavetes and Heather Wahlquist. The film stars Wahlquist, Riley Keough, Sienna Miller, David Morse, Ray Liotta, Melanie Griffith and Lucy Punch.

Yellow premiered at the 2012 Toronto International Film Festival, and had a limited release in the United States on August 29, 2014.

== Plot ==
Mary Holmes is an elementary school teacher living in a hallucinatory world and consuming twenty Vicodin a day. One day she is fired from her job after being caught having sex with one of the parents on Parent Teacher Day. She leaves Los Angeles and returns to her native Oklahoma, and tries to cope with numerous family traumas, including a past incestuous relationship with her half-brother.

== Cast ==
- Heather Wahlquist as Mary Holmes
- Riley Keough as Young Amanda
- Sienna Miller as Xanne
- David Morse as Psychologist
- Ray Liotta as Afai
- Melanie Griffith as Patsy
- Lucy Punch as Amanda
- Max Thieriot as Young Nowell
- Elizabeth Daily as Aunt Netty
- Daveigh Chase as Young Mary
- Gena Rowlands as Mimi
- Cassandra Jean as Becky
- Brendan Sexton III as Nowell
- Jordan Flash Rose as Chad
- Gary Stretch as Jimmy Carpenito Snr
- Onata Aprile as Linda
- Bella Dayne as Ashley
- Malea Rose as Zadora
- Nancy De Mayo as Miss Withrow
- Tonya Cornelisse as Starla

== Production ==
80 percent of the film was shot in Oklahoma. Locations included Oklahoma City University and John Marshall High School in Oklahoma City, and a grocery store in Shawnee. The remainder of filming took place in Los Angeles.

== Release ==
The film premiered at the Toronto International Film Festival on September 8, 2012.

The film received a limited theatrical release in the United States by its production company, Medient Studios, on August 29, 2014.

== Reception ==
The film was awarded "Best Film" at the Catalina Film Festival on September 22, 2013.
