= Stardust Award for Best Director =

Film award in India

The Stardust Best Director is chosen by the readers of the annual Stardust magazine. The award honors a director that has made an impact, introduced in the year 2009. Here is a list of the award winners and the films for which they won.

Year	Director	Film
2017	Saket Chaudhary	Hindi Medium
2016	Karan Johar	Ae Dil Hai Mushkil
2015	Kabir Khan	Bajrangi Bhaijaan
2014	Imtiaz Ali; Vikas Bahl	Highway; Queen
2013	Shoojit Sircar	Vicky Donor
2012	Tigmanshu Dhulia	Saheb Biwi Aur Gangster
2011	Karan Johar	My Name is Khan
2010	Ranjit Kapoor	Chintu Ji
2009	Neeraj Pandey	A Wednesday
