= Bobby Singh (cinematographer) =

Indian cinematographer

Bobby Singh (1974 - 25 December 2012) was an Indian cinematographer who worked in Hindi films, most known for films like Gangster (2006), Life in a Metro (2007), The Dirty Picture (2011) and Queen (2014). He died following an asthma attack in Goa on 25 December 2012 at the age of 38.

== Career ==
Singh started his career in 1999 as an assistant cameraman to Vikas Sivaraman on Sarfarosh (1999). Eventually, he made his debut as an independent cinematographer with the cult crime thriller Gangster (2006) directed by Anurag Basu and starring Shiney Ahuja, Emraan Hashmi and debutant Kangana Ranaut. He immediately worked again with Basu in Life in a Metro (2007). Both the films were highly acclaimed for their cinematography along with the direction and music. He later also did additional photography for Ghajini (2008) directed by A. R. Murugadoss. His next big film was Milan Luthria's National Film Award-winning biopic The Dirty Picture (2011) starring Vidya Balan.

He died suddenly following an asthma attack on 25 December 2012, at the age of 38. At the time, he was on a holiday in Goa, with wife and son. At the time of his death, he had completed the shooting of Special Chabbis, which was released, posthumously, in February 2013. He had also shot 90% of Kangana Ranaut's Queen, directed by Vikas Bahl, which was eventually released in 2014. Siddharth Diwan shot the remaining portions of the film.

== Filmography ==
Year	Film	Language	Notes
2006	Gangster	Hindi	
2006	Woh Lamhe	Hindi	
2007	Life in a Metro	Hindi	
2008	Kidnap	Hindi	
2010	No Problem	Hindi	
2011	Kucch Luv Jaisaa	Hindi	
2011	The Dirty Picture	Hindi	
2012	Jannat 2	Hindi	
2013	Special 26	Hindi	
2014	Queen	Hindi	

== Personal life ==
He is survived by his wife Radhika and son Sumer living in Mumbai, while his parents live in Ahmedabad. One of his family dogs died after bobby's death.
