= Queen (2013 film) =

2014 Indian film by Vikas Bahl

- Theatrical release poster
- Directed by: Vikas Bahl
- Written by: Anvita Dutt Guptan
- Screenplay by: Vikas Bahl; Chaitally Parmar; Parveez Shaikh
- Story by: Vikas Bahl
- Produced by: Anurag Kashyap; Vikramaditya Motwane
- Starring: Kangana Ranaut; Rajkummar Rao; Lisa Haydon
- Cinematography: Bobby Singh; Additional Cinematography: Siddharth Diwan
- Edited by: Abhijit Kokate; Anurag Kashyap
- Music by: Amit Trivedi
- Production company: Phantom Films
- Distributed by: Viacom18 Motion Pictures
- Release dates: October 2013 (Busan); 7 March 2014; (India)
- Running time: 146 minutes
- Country: India
- Language: Hindi
- Budget: ₹20 crore
- Box office: ₹95.04 crore

Queen is a 2014 Indian Hindi-language comedy-drama film directed by Vikas Bahl and produced by Anurag Kashyap, Vikramaditya Motwane, and Madhu Mantena. The film stars Kangana Ranaut in the lead role, with Lisa Haydon and Rajkummar Rao playing supporting roles. The film follows the story of Rani Mehra, a diffident Punjabi girl from New Delhi who embarks on her honeymoon to Paris and Amsterdam by herself after her fiancé calls off their wedding.

Bahl co-wrote the script of Queen with Chaitally Parmar and Parveez Shaikh. Anvita Dutt Guptan wrote the dialogues for the film. Ranaut, who was encouraged by Bahl to improvise her lines during filming, is recognized as an additional dialogue writer. Amit Trivedi provided the musical score and Guptan also wrote the lyrics. Principal photography of Queen began in 2012 and took 45 days to complete. Queen received universal critical acclaim, praised for its direction, screenplay and Ranaut's titular performance, with various critics and publications citing it as the best Indian film of 2014. Made on a budget of ₹230 million (US$2.4 million), the film earned over ₹950 million (US$9.9 million) at the global box-office, emerging as a commercial success. It is one of the highest-grossing Indian films featuring a female protagonist. The film won several accolades at prominent Indian and international award ceremonies. At the 60th Filmfare Awards ceremony, the film received a leading 13 nominations and won a leading 6 awards, including Best Film, Best Director (Bahl), and Best Actress (Ranaut). At the 62nd National Film Awards ceremony, the film won the Best Hindi Film (Bahl) and Best Actress (Ranaut).

Queen is cited as a groundbreaking and an influential feminist film by many scholars. Over the years, the film has built a strong cult following. It was named one of the best films of the decade (2010s) by multiple publications such as Paste and Film Companion. Several publications such as O, The Oprah Magazine and Cosmopolitan have named it one of the best films of Indian cinema. Shubhra Gupta from The Indian Express named Queen as one of India's 75 most iconic and finest films that celebrate the journey of the country. The British Film Institute ranked Queen amongst the 10 greatest Bollywood films of the 21st century.

== Plot ==
Rani Mehra, a sheltered and meek 24-year-old Punjabi woman from Delhi, is left devastated when her fiancé, Vijay Dhingra, calls off their wedding just two days before the ceremony. Vijay, who has recently lived abroad, explains that his lifestyle has changed and that Rani's conservative habits no longer align with his. After spending a day locked in her room reflecting on their relationship, Rani decides to take control of her life and requests her parents' permission to embark on her pre-booked honeymoon to Paris and Amsterdam alone. Though initially hesitant, her parents and supportive grandmother agree, believing a change of scenery will help her heal.

In Paris, a overwhelmed Rani struggles to adapt to the foreign city and experiences minor run-ins with the local police and a street robber. She contemplates returning to India immediately, but is salvaged by Vijayalakshmi, a free-spirited hotel employee of French-Spanish-Indian descent. Vijayalakshmi takes Rani under her wing, guiding her through the city and introducing her to a liberated lifestyle. During these adventures, Rani frequently recalls memories of Vijay patronizing her, controlling her behavior, and forbidding her from dancing or drinking. While trying on a revealing outfit, Rani accidentally sends a selfie to Vijay instead of Vijayalakshmi. The photograph instantly reignites Vijay's interest, prompting him to travel to Europe to track her down.

Rani bids an emotional farewell to Vijayalakshmi and travels to Amsterdam, where she discovers her hostel room is shared with three male travelers: Taka from Japan, Tim from France, and Oleksander from Russia. Overcoming her initial skepticism, she forms a deep bond with them. Together, they explore the city, visiting historical sites, a sex shop, and a dance club, where Rani befriends Rukhsar, a Pakistani pole dancer who secretly supports her family in Lahore. As Rani gains confidence and independence, she enters a local culinary competition and successfully sells gol gappas, realizing her own earning potential. Following the event, she shares a brief, amicable romantic moment with Marcello, an Italian restaurant owner.

Rani's newfound independence is interrupted when Vijay tracks her down at the hostel. He apologizes and demands she reconsider the marriage, but when he tries to physically grab her, Rani's roommates intervene, and she orders him to leave. Later, Rani agrees to meet Vijay for dinner to discuss their future. However, Vijay immediately begins criticizing her new friends, her living arrangements, and her behavior. Realizing he has not changed, Rani abruptly leaves the dinner, stating they will speak after she returns to India. She spends one final night celebrating at a concert with her roommates before flying back to Delhi.

Back in India, Rani visits Vijay at his home. Assuming she has returned to reconcile, Vijay and his family immediately begin reorganizing the wedding festivities. Instead, a poised and confident Rani hands him her engagement ring, softly thanks him for giving her the opportunity to discover herself by rejecting her, and walks away with a smile.

== Cast ==
- Kangana Ranaut as Rani Mehra (Rani means Queen in English)
- Rajkumar Rao as Vijay Dhingra, Rani's selfish and aggressive fiancé
- Lisa Haydon as Vijayalakshmi, Rani's friend
- Mish Boyko as Oleksander (Sikander)
- Jeffrey Ho as Taka
- Joseph Guitobh as Tim
- Tantrik Baba as Baba
- Marco Canadea as Marcello, Rani's Crush
- Yogendra Tiku as Rani's Father
- Alka Badola Kaushal as Rani's Mother
- Sabeeka Imam as Roxette (Rukhsar)
- Chinmai Chandranshuh as Chintu Mehra, Rani's Brother
- Tripta Lakhanpal as Dadi
- Nayani Dixit as Sonal
- Alexandre Plasti Melara as flying pig drunk No. 1
- Leonardo Pricoli as flying pig drunk No. 2

== Production ==
=== Development ===
Producer-director Vikas Bahl made his directorial debut with Chillar Party (2011), co-directed with Nitesh Tiwari, which won three National Film Awards. Since he liked the story of Queen, he decided to direct the film himself. It was eventually produced by Viacom 18 Motion Pictures and Phantom Films, which he co-owns with Anurag Kashyap and Vikram Motwane.

The lead role of Rani was earlier offered to Kareena Kapoor and Priyanka Chopra, both of whom turned down the film. As he wrote the script, he based Rani on people he had observed while growing up in Delhi. "I know life for girls is planned out for them by their families. They lose their own perspective on life and they are okay with that." In a scenario where as a girl crosses 20, her family gets busy to get her "settled", she never plans anything by herself, unless as in this case of Rani, marriage plans go awry. Thus the script was developed so that in the "first half, Rani gets over the guy, and in the second, she gets over herself." Bahl wrote the script keeping Ranaut in mind, however it was Anurag Basu who connected him with her and helped cast her in the film.

After her audition, actress Lisa Haydon, who played an Indo-French hotel staff member, Vijaylaksmi, practiced French for a month. Other actors Mish Boyko (Alexander) and Jeffery Ho (Taka) were cast after auditions in London, while Joseph Guitobh (Tim), who played Rani's third roommate, was spotted singing on a street and was asked whether he'd be interested in working in Hindi film, though he couldn't speak English.

=== Filming ===
The film was shot in late 2012 over a period of 45 days, starting with Paris, followed by Amsterdam and Delhi. Despite shooting abroad, Vikas Bahl did not have a huge budget to spend on the film. He took a crew of 25 people from India to shoot the film in about 145 locations in 40 days. Locations were booked a couple of hours, before the crew would rush to another location as they often shot 3–4 locations in a day. The crew would eat their meals at nearby restaurants, and at times actors including lead Kangana Ranaut would change clothes in nearby public toilets and restaurants. Since the film was not shot in a linear fashion, the colour of mehndi, applied to bride's hand was faded to match its natural fading. During the filming upon Ranaut's suggestion some scenes were added, like the kiss scene with the Italian chef, and a small scene where Rani asks a stranger to click her picture in Amsterdam. She even ended up writing a lot of her dialogue, and was given credit for the additional dialogue. In fact during filming, the director allowed all the actors to improvise their dialogue, to add realism to the film.

The remixed version of "Hungama Ho Gaya" was shot at Club NL, in Amsterdam, where a Hindi song was played for the first time.

However, when 90 percent of the film was already shot, cinematographer Bobby Singh died suddenly following an asthma attack on 25 December 2012, after just having completed a schedule in Delhi. After seeing rushes of the film, Anurag Kashyap volunteered to edit the film himself and since Bahl didn't have any editors at the time, he too agreed.

== Marketing ==
The trailer of the film was released on 20 December 2013.

== Soundtrack ==
The film's soundtrack is composed by Amit Trivedi, with lyrics by Anvita Dutt. The album was released exclusively on iTunes on 23 January 2014, followed by a release on all streaming platforms on 25 January 2014. The music album was physically released on 5 February 2014 at the Kala Ghoda Arts Festival in Mumbai. An additional track was released on 1 March 2014, it was the remixed version of hit cabaret number of the 1970s Hungama Ho Gaya sung by Asha Bhosle for the film, Anhonee (1973) was remixed by Amit Trivedi for the film, with additional vocals by Arijit Singh. The song was also used in end credits of the film.

== Critical reception ==
Queen, as well as Ranaut's performance, received universal critical acclaim. On the review aggregator website Rotten Tomatoes, Queen has an approval rating of 90% based on 10 reviews, with an average rating of 8/10. On the Indian film review aggregator website The Review Monk, Queen received an average score of 8.1/10 based on 31 reviews and 100% critics being in the favor.

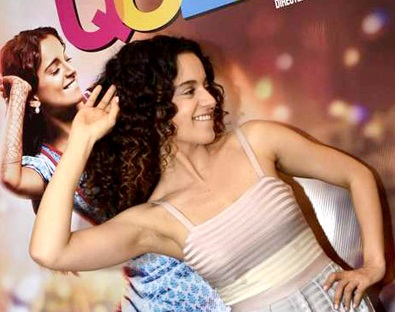
Ranaut's performance as the titular character garnered widespread critical acclaim winning her the National Film Award for Best Actress.

=== India ===
Meena Iyer from Times of India gave the film a rating of 4.5/5 and wrote, ‘‘This film belongs to its director Vikas Bahl; Bollywood should blow bugles in his honour’’. Calling Ranaut a ‘‘class act’’ she further wrote, ‘‘Ranaut's performance is outstanding; Whether she's crestfallen or ecstatic, selling golgappas or naively buying sex-toys, hiding her infatuation for an Italian restaurateur or showing deep dejection about her wimpy beau Vijay, she's a class act’’. Sarita Tanwar from DNA gave the film a rating of 4.5/5 and wrote, ‘‘Queen is irresistible. Highly recommended. A must-see film. You will leave the theatre with your heart humming happily’’. Praising Ranaut's performance she further wrote, ‘‘Kangana displays a surprising capacity for both comedy and emotion. As Rani, she displays amazing vulnerability and depth that very few performers can pull off; She is a delight’’. Saurabh Dwivedi from India Today gave the film a rating of 4.5/5 and called it a ‘‘must-watch’’. He praised Ranaut's performance by writing, ‘‘Kangana has a done fabulous job playing Rani; She has let her fans and audience know that she means business and is here to be taken seriously’’. Devesh Sharma from Filmfare gave the film a rating of 4.5/5 and opined, ‘‘Queen is definitely a step in the right direction for Indian Cinema’’. Praising Ranaut's performance he wrote, ‘‘It's Kangana's film from frame one. The way she flits from one aspect of her character to another without breaking strides shows her maturity as an actor’’.

Subhash K Jha of The New Indian Express gave the film a rating of 4.5/5 and called Queen a ‘‘near flawless inspirational tale’’. Praising Ranaut's performance he further wrote, ‘‘In Queen, Kangana is so in-sync with her character that you wonder if the story was written according to the emotions that the actress had stored away in her heart; Her performance holds the film together’’. Saibal Chatterjee of NDTV gave the film a rating of 4/5 and described ‘‘Queen is spicy, balmy and uplifting. Like good gol gappas, it leaves a zesty aftertaste that lingers on until long after the ride has ended. It warms the heart and tickles the funny bone with equal force’’. Praising Ranaut's performance he further wrote, ‘‘Kangana's is the heart and soul of Queen and she does not strike a single false note; It is a performance that should define not only her career from here on, but also the fate of any young Bollywood actress seeking to push the boundaries of what is acceptable within the framework of the commercial Hindi movie industry’’. Taran Adarsh of Bollywood Hungama gave the film a rating of 4/5 and wrote, ‘‘Queen reinvents the genre with its non-formulaic screenplay and skilled direction; A charming little film, this one's made with heart and feeling and it shows’’. Praising Ranaut's performance he further wrote, ‘‘Kangana captures the nuances of her character spot-on; She's simply outstanding! The earnestness and sincerity she invests in her performance is for all to see; It won't be erroneous to state that she turns Rani into the most real woman you've encountered on the Hindi screen lately’’. Anupama Chopra stated that, ‘‘Queen is about the metamorphosis of Rani’’. She gave the film a rating of 3.5/5 and wrote, ‘‘Ultimately Queen is Kangana's triumph. I left the theater thinking about Rani and how the rest of her life would pan out. It's not often you do that with a Bollywood character’’.

Rajeev Masand of CNN-IBN gave the film a rating of 4/5 and described it as an ‘‘extraordinary journey of self-discovery’’. Calling Ranaut's performance ‘‘raw’’ and ‘‘nuanced’’ he further wrote, ‘‘it's Kangana Ranaut who makes you root for Rani from the word go; The best way to describe her fabulous performance is by confessing that I forgot I was watching Kangana. It's a raw, nuanced, delicately comical performance, and Bahl rightfully builds his film around his fearless, quirky heroine’’. Raja Sen from Rediff gave the film a rating of 4/5 and wrote, ‘‘Queen is a good entertainer, sure, but, more critically, it is a showcase for an actress poised to reign. This is one of those monumental moments when you feel the movies shift, and nothing remains the same; I've seen the future, baby, and it's Kangana’’. Praising Ranaut's performance he further wrote, ‘‘Ranaut is gobstoppingly spectacular; she absolutely shines and the film stands back and lets her rule. It's a bold but immaculately measured performance, internalised and powerful while simultaneously as overt as it needs to be to moisten every eye in the house’’. Shubhra Gupta of The Indian Express gave the film a rating of 4/5 and wrote, ‘‘Queen is a significant Bollywood marker, a film that is intensely local and gloriously global, with a terrific lead performance by Kangana Ranaut, in a story that bubbles over with real feeling and meaning’’. Calling Ranaut the ‘‘Queen of Hearts’’ she further wrote, ‘‘Kangana Ranaut revels in her solidly-written role, and delivers a first rate, heart-felt performance’’.

Sudhish Kamath of The Hindu wrote, ‘‘Queen explores a girl's identity as an independent entity. It's about a rooted Indian girl who goes on a holiday to find herself’’. Praising Ranaut's performance he further wrote, ‘‘Kangana Ranaut as Rani, in a role of a lifetime, makes Queen an absolutely delightful journey. She wins us over first with innocence, small-town charm, vulnerability, spirit, strength, warmth and her gradual confidence’’. Namrata Joshi of Outlook India gave the film a rating of 3.5/4 and wrote, ‘‘Queen is a squarely mainstream film; Simplistic? Undemanding? Perhaps. But ultimately it is immensely warm and winsome, pressing just the right emotional buttons’’. Deepanjana Pal of Firstpost called Queen a ‘‘fabulous film’’ and a ‘‘delight’’. Calling Ranaut's performance ‘‘endearing’’ and ‘‘electric’’ she wrote, ‘‘Ranaut as Rani is pitch perfect. She brings out the sweetness, the hurt, the belligerence and the head-screwed-tightly-on-her-shoulders sensibility that is the pride of the Indian middle class. The cherry on this acting cake is that this lady's got superb comic timing’’.

=== Overseas ===
Shafiq Ul Hasan from The Express Tribune gave the film a rating of 4/5 and wrote, ‘‘Queen is a peek into the life of a woman who embarks upon a journey, her own honeymoon to be precise, in an attempt to find herself when her wedding is cancelled at the last minute’’. Praising Ranaut and Bahl he further wrote, ‘‘This was, by far, one of Kangana Ranaut's truest and finest performances; Vikas Bahl directed the movie with superb class, I don't think I would change a thing about it’’. David Chute of Variety wrote, ‘‘Queen seems an oddly modest film to have made such a big splash. It is charming and at times unexpectedly moving, especially in moments of cross-cultural bonding between Rani and the odd assorted group of expats who befriend her, as she wanders somewhat cluelessly around Paris and Amsterdam’’. Olga Camacho of The National wrote, ‘‘There are surprisingly few clichés, romantic angles or moments of epiphany in the film – instead, we get some genuine laughs and an honest look at relationships’’. Suparna Sharma of Deccan Chronicle gave the film a rating of 3/5 and wrote, ‘‘Queen is a well-meaning, well-mannered film that's funny and packs in small, elevating, but palatable messages. It challenges nothing; It just shows an Indian girl slowly, gently renegotiating life while remaining true to who she is’’. Praising Ranaut's performance she further wrote, ‘‘Kangana Ranaut has always been a powerful performer. She's an actress with lots of talent who has taken on roles that are different, challenging and out of the league of most Bollywood actresses fighting the number game. And here too she has made a bold choice and a difficult one as well. She stays true to the character she is playing, as it has been etched out, never once over-reaching and going for histrionics. She doesn't try to grab you. She just tugs at you, with her subtle, nuanced performance; She is in complete control and is very good’’.

=== Year-end lists ===
Anupama Chopra of Film Companion crowned Queen as the best film of the year 2014. Mihir Fadnavis of Firstpost cited Queen as one of the best Bollywood films of 2014. Calling it the ‘‘biggest surprise of the year’’ he said, The film had rare ‘‘subtlety’’ and ‘‘quality’’ for a mainstream commercial film. Sukanya Verma of Rediff cited it as one of the best films of 2014. She stated, ‘‘Queen's heartening success proves women-oriented subjects are just as welcome’’. Shafiq Ul Hasan of The Express Tribune listed Queen as one of the best Bollywood films of 2014. Ishita Blaggan of NDTV named it as one of the top ten Bollywood hits of 2014. Subramanian Harikumar of DNA listed it as one of the best Bollywood films of 2014. India TV listed it as one of the best women-centric movies of 2014. Calling Ranaut's performance in the film ‘‘effortless’’ they wrote, ‘‘Queen is one of the best gifts that Bollywood received on International Women's Day’’. Film critic Anna M. M. Vetticad in her blog crowned Queen as the best film of the year 2014 and Ranaut as the best actress of the year 2014. Additionally, she ranked Haydon as the second best supporting actress of the year. For her performance in Queen, The Indian Express named Ranaut as the best actress of 2014. Hindustan Times listed Ranaut as one of the top female performers of the year 2014 in Bollywood. CNN-IBN listed Ranaut's performance in the film as one of the stand-out performances of 2014. Raja Sen of Rediff ranked Ranaut as the second best actress of year 2014. He wrote, ‘‘Ranaut, who has written her own dialogue in the film, fashions a character with undying spirit and verve’’. Nandini Ramnath of Scroll listed Ranaut's character in the film, Rani, as one of the best roles in Hindi films of 2014.

== Impact and legacy ==
=== Impact ===
According to Hindustan Times, Queen is considered to be Ranaut's calling-card film. Not only did it cement Ranaut as one of the most sought-after actors in the Hindi film industry, it also changed the Bollywood landscape and inspired a streak of films like NH10 (2015), Piku (2015), Neerja (2016), Pink (2016) and Lipstick Under My Burkha (2017). They further stated, ‘‘Queen's success empowered not only female actors, but also producers, who could no longer cite the lack of stars as being detrimental to their films’ chances at the box office’’. Oshin Fernandes from The Free Press Journal called Queen a ‘‘niche-breaker’’ in Hindi Cinema. Critics called Queen a ‘‘game-changer’’ and wrote, ‘‘Queen was not just a game-changer for Ranaut, but also for all the women out there who received hope and motivation to live their lives on their own terms’’. Farhan Syed of Times of India listed Queen as one of the ten Bollywood movies that broke stereotypes. Queen popularized solo trips and inspired a lot of women to have a solo trip to Europe. In 2019, Megha Sharma from Vogue India published a guide to a solo European holiday inspired by Ranaut's Queen.

Namrata Joshi called Queen a ‘‘game-changer’’. She wrote, ‘‘It was Queen (2014) that was the real game changer; The low-budget film hit a chord, quickly climbing to the top of the charts and since then, other films have featured male superstars fighting for women's causes, such as Aamir Khan in Dangal (2016), or showing their feminist side, such as Akshay Kumar making rotis (flatbread) for his on-screen wife in Jolly LLB 2 (2017)’’. About Ranaut's performance in Queen, Saibal Chatterjee opined, ‘‘It is a performance that should define not only her career, but also the fate of any young Bollywood actress seeking to push the boundaries of what is acceptable within the framework of the commercial Hindi movie industry’’. Baradwaj Rangan stated, ‘‘Queen's success is validation that audiences are open to a range of women-centric films, from heavy-duty dramas to small, breezy dramedies’’. Devesh Sharma of Filmfare called Queen a ‘‘step in right direction for Indian Cinema’’. He stated that, ‘‘Queen will pave the way for more story-centric films in future; After Vidya Balan and Priyanka Chopra, Ranaut has staked her claim as the right choice for gutsy roles’’.

=== Legacy ===
Runjhun Noopur from Arré called Queen a classic film and wrote, ‘‘Queen is a rare legit classic, as relevant today as it was in 2014’’. She described Queen as a groundbreaking and an influential feminist film. Writing about Queen's legacy she opined, ‘‘Queen is a piece of art with a life of its own, a story that makes you feel connected to the world in ways few things can; Beyond the feminism, it is a story of human triumph that gives you hope and makes you want to fight for your happiness; It makes you want to believe in people, in friends, in strangers who become your fleeting accomplices in the journey of life and that is the true legacy of Queen’’. Shrishti Negi from CNN-IBN cited Queen as one of the best movies of 2010s decade and the film which represents or defined the year 2014 in Hindi Cinema. She further wrote, ‘‘In Bollywood, where we are used to watching romance between a couple (man and woman), Queen shows us some other kind of love, i.e. self-love, which is not only liberating but completely fulfilling’’. Anupama Chopra called Queen a ‘‘Kangana's triumph’’. Arushi Kapoor from Vagabomb called Queen the most feminist film of recent years and stated, ‘‘Queen undoubtedly made a strong statement with the central plot of a girl moving on after being left at the altar and finding herself; but even beyond the essence of the film was a multi-layered message of beautifully portrayed feminist ideals; Queen was, arguably, the most feminist film in Bollywood post the 2000's [sic] and definitely a lesson in Feminism 101’’. Shubhra Gupta from The Indian Express named Queen as one of India's seventy-five most iconic films that celebrate the journey of the country. She also featured Queen in her book called ‘‘50 Films That Changed Bollywood’’. In 2017, cultural professor Rachel Dwyer named Queen as one of the 70 iconic Movies of Independent India.

‘‘Queen released, changed my life and Indian cinema forever marked the birth of a new leading lady and woman-centric parallel cinema. Queen is not just a film for me, it was an explosion of everything I ever deserved (that) was kept away from me for 10 long years. Everything came all at once, it was overwhelming’’.

— Ranaut on the occasion of 7th anniversary of Queen.

Deepanjana Pal of Firstpost stated that, ‘‘Queen is the first time Ranaut got a script that really allows her to confirm she's more than a pretty face. There's no high fashion or flattering make-up to flaunt Ranaut's physical beauty in Queen, but this is a role that allows Ranaut to showcase not just her acting talents, but also her wit because Ranaut is credited with contributing additional dialogues to the film’’. Aamy Kuldip of Brown Girl Magazine said Queen should be every brown girl's favorite movie and opined, ‘‘Queen won our hearts and it started the era of brown girls with new-found confidence’’. He called Ranaut's character in Queen, Rani, the ‘‘epitome’’ of the average brown girl trying to settle in the misogynistic and hypocritical world of ours; coming to the realization that accepting yourself is the first step in having the world accept you.

Ranaut's character in Queen, Rani Mehra, has become one of the most popular and recognizable characters in Hindi Cinema. India Film Project listed it as one of the 4 best characters from Hindi Cinema. Alisha Alam of Times of India listed it as one of the strongest female characters from Bollywood. Filmfare listed it as one of the fifteen strongest women characters in Bollywood. Hindustan Times listed it as one of the thirteen most powerful women characters portrayed in Bollywood. Radhika Seth and Riya Dhankar of Vogue India listed it as one of the most empowering female characters in Bollywood. Srishti Magan of ScoopWhoop listed it as one of the nineteen most relatable female characters from Bollywood. Queen featured on various decade-end lists with several publications naming it as one of the best Indian films of the 2010s decade. Film Companion listed it as one of the twenty-five greatest Hindi films of the decade. Radhika Menon of Paste listed it as one of the twenty best Bollywood movies of 2010s. Avijit Ghosh of Times of India listed it as one of the eleven best movies of the decade. Shubhra Gupta of The Indian Express listed it as one of the best Bollywood films of the decade. Rajeev Masand listed it as one of the ten best Hindi films of the decade. Shrishti Negi of CNN-IBN listed it as one of the best Hindi films of the decade. Nandini Ramnath of Scroll cited it as one of the best Indian films of the decade. The Free Press Journal cited it as one of the best Bollywood movies of the decade. Srishti Magan of ScoopWhoop cited it as one of the forty-five films that redefined Bollywood in 2010s decade.

Queen is cited as one of the best Indian films of all time by several publications. Emma Carey of Esquire cited it as one of the best Bollywood movies of all time. Rachel Dwyer from British Film Institute cited it as one of the ten greatest Bollywood films of the 21st century. Time Out listed it as one of the hundred best Bollywood movies of all time. Ineye Komonibo of Marie Claire listed it as one of the thirty-eight best Bollywood movies of all time. Times of India cited it as one of the twenty best Bollywood movies of all time. Jasmine Ting of Cosmopolitan cited it as one of the best Indian films. Radhika Menon of Paste listed it as one of the fifteen best Bollywood movies. ZEE5 listed it as one of the thirty evergreen Bollywood films that one should watch before they die. Prakruti Patel and Elena Nicolaou of O, The Oprah Magazine listed it as one of the best films in Indian Cinema. Sonali Pimputkar of The Free Press Journal cited it as one of the fifteen must-watch female-oriented movies in Bollywood.

== Box office ==
Queen has grossed ₹847 million (US$8.8 million) in India, with a further ₹103 million (US$1.1 million) in overseas, for a worldwide total of ₹950 million (US$9.9 million).

Queen debuted with relatively low collections and grossed ₹2 crore (US$207,685) on the first day, grossing ₹3.5 crore (US$360,000) on the second day, and ₹4.3 crore (US$450,000) on the third day, taking the first weekend's collection to ₹9.5 crore (US$990,000). Despite a slow start, Queen held up well in the first weekdays and grossed around ₹2.5 crore (US$260,000) per day during the week and ended the first week with ₹18 crore (US$1.9 million). On its second Monday it grossed ₹3 crore (US$310,000), coinciding with a holiday in India. Queen had a higher collection in the second week than the first week, collecting ₹39 crore (US$4.0 million) in two weeks. The movie had a massive third week growth for a 2014 film and earned ₹11.5 crore (US$1.2 million), which totals the third week collection to ₹50.5 crore (US$5.2 million). In the fourth week, the film managed a promising ₹6.5 crore (US$670,000), which is the 11th highest gross of all time in the history of Hindi cinema for the fourth week. The final domestic collection was just under ₹61.5 crore (US$6.4 million), making it the highest-grossing Hindi film driven by a female lead at the time before being surpassed by Ranaut's own Tanu Weds Manu Returns (2015) a year later.

== Awards and nominations ==
At the 62nd National Film Awards, the film won Best Hindi Film (Bahl) and Best Actress (Ranaut). At the 60th Filmfare Awards ceremony, Queen won a leading 6 awards out of a leading 13 nominations: Best Film, Best Director (Bahl), Best Actress (Ranaut), Best Background Score (Trivedi), Best Cinematography and Best Editing. At the 2015 Screen Awards ceremony, Queen received a leading 13 nominations, and won Best Film, Best Director (Bahl) and Best Cinematography. Other nominations included Best Actress (Ranaut), and Best Supporting Actress (Haydon). At the 2015 Star Guild Awards, the film won Best Director (Bahl), Best Story, Best Screenplay, and Best Editing awards. Queen also won Best Film, Best Director (Bahl) and Best Actress (Ranaut) at the 2015 Stardust Awards ceremony. At the 16th IIFA Awards, Queen received 7 nominations, and won 5 awards including Best Film and Best Actress (Ranaut).

== Remakes ==
Film	Director	Release Date	Language	Lead actress	Ref.
Zam Zam	Neelakanta	Unreleased	Malayalam	Manjima Mohan	
Butterfly	Ramesh Aravind	Unreleased	Kannada	Parul Yadav	
Paris Paris	Ramesh Aravind	Unreleased	Tamil	Kajal Aggarwal	
That Is Mahalakshmi	Prasanth Varma	Unreleased	Telugu	Tamannaah Bhatia	
