= Heather Wahlquist =

American film and television actress

- Other name: Mimi Wahlquist
- Education: Seminole High School
- Alma mater: University of Oklahoma (dropped out)
- Occupation: Actress
- Years active: 1998–2012

Heather Wahlquist is an American film and television actress. She appeared in several of Nick Cassavetes's films.

Wahlquist was raised in Oklahoma, where she graduated from Seminole High School and studied psychology for two years at the University of Oklahoma. She is the co-writer, with Cassavetes, of the motion picture Yellow (2012), and stars as a woman who returns to her native Oklahoma after running into problems in her life in Los Angeles.

== Filmography ==
Film and television
Year	Title	Role	Notes
1998	Simon Says	Lifeguard Baby Betty	
2001	Good Advice	Sarah Banks	
2002	John Q	Julie Bird	
2004	The Incredible Mrs. Ritchie	Anne (uncredited)	TV film
2004	The Notebook	Sara Tuffington	
2006	Alpha Dog	Wanda Haynes	
2009	Lonely Street	Kathy Grabow	
2009	My Sister's Keeper	Aunt Kelly	
2012	Yellow	Mary Holmes	Also writer
