= Stardust Award for Best Film =

List of winners of the Stardust Best Film Award

The Stardust Best Film is chosen by the readers of the annual Stardust magazine. The award honours a film that has made an impact since 2009. Here is a list of the award winners and the films for which they won.

Year	Film	Producer/Production
2008	Jab We Met	Dhilin Mehta
2009	A Wednesday!	UTV Motion Pictures
2010	Chintu Ji	Bobby Bedi
2011	Love Sex aur Dhokha	Alt Entertainment
2012	Ragini MMS	Alt Entertainment
2013	Vicky Donor	John Abraham
2014	Queen	Phantom Films

== See also ==
- Stardust Awards
- Bollywood
- Cinema of India
