= Supriya Lohith =

Indian playback singer

- Origin: Bengaluru, Karnataka, India
- Genres: filmi
- Occupation: Singer
- Years active: 2007–present
- Website: https://www.supriyalohith.com/

Supriya Lohith aka Supriyaa Ram is a playback singer who has sung for Kannada films. who got basic training in carnatic music from Vidwan Munivenkatappa. she recorded her first song in 2007. She has over 500 films songs to her credit

== Discography ==
Year	Film	Song	Music director	Co-singers
2008	Madesha	Munjane manjagu	Mano Murthy	Kunal Ganjawala
2013	Topiwala	Gala gala	V. Harikrishna	Tippu
2014	Savaari 2	Ninna Danigagi(version2)	Manikanth Kadri	Santhosh Venky
2014	Belli	Doona Doona	V Sridhar Sambhram	Karthik
2014	Belli	Belli belli	V Sridhar Sambhram	
2014	Rang (Tulu)	Kadala poyyeda	Manikanth Kadri	Nakul Abhyankar
2015	Jaathre	Tarikere yerimele	Manikanth Kadri	Puneeth Rajkumar
2015	Male	Ninnanda nodalendu	Jassie Gift	Karthik
2015	Male	Bul bul	Jassie Gift	Jassie Gift
2015	Rathavara	Nee muddada maayavi	Dharma Vish	Rajesh Krishnan
2016	Run Antony	Marula	Manikanth Kadri	Soham Chakraborthy
2017	Chamak	Nee nanna olavu	Judah Sandhy	Abhinandan
2017	Mass Leader	Abida Abida	Veer Samarth	Veer Samarth
2017	Ondu Motteya Kathe	Neenillade	Midhun Mukundan	Raghu Ram
2018	Gultoo	Kadalaache	Amit Anand	Raghu Ram
2019	Paris Paris	Vela Mulla sollula	Amit Trivedi	Sathya Prakash
2019	Aadi Lakshmi Puraana	Manase Muttaala	Anup Bhandari	Vijay Prakash
2019	Kempegowda 2	Usire	Varun Unni	Varun Unni
2019	Yaana	Mirchi song	Joshua Sridhar	Indu Nagaraj, Santhosh Venky
2019	Naduve Antaravirali	Kannu kannu	Ds Manasi	Manikanth Kadri
