= Abhijit Kokate =

Indian film editor (born 1982)

- Born: Abhijit Kokate; 13 August 1982 (age 44); Nagpur, Maharashtra, India
- Occupations: Film Editor, Film Director
- Years active: 2010–present
- Spouse: Arlene Kokate
- Children: 2

Abhijit Kokate (born 1982) is an Indian film editor in Bollywood, most known for his films, Not a Love Story (2011), Department (2012) and most recent film, Queen (2014).

== Early life ==
Kokate was born on 13 August 1982 in Nagpur, Maharashtra, India.

== Career ==
Abhijit Kokate started his career as an editor in 2011 with director/producer Ram Gopal Varma film Not A Love Story After that he edited Ab tak Chhappan 2, Department, Poshter Boyz, Blouse, Titoo MBA, Queen and he is currently working with director/producer Anurag Kashyap. In 2014 he got Best editing International Indian Film Academy Awards (IIFA) and Filmfare Awards 2015 for Queen movie. He also directed Discovery show Off Road with Gul Panag along with Gul Panag. In 2019 he directed Bollywood movie Rakkhosh.He also won Best Director (Special Jury) award at Rajasthan International Film Festival for Rakkhosh film.

Abhijit Kokate has also written and directed a short film titled, The Vanishing Hitchhiker, for which he has won the Best Direction award at the Mahindra XUV 500 Memorable Stories short film contest, conducted by The 48 Hour Film Project.

== Filmography ==
Year	Film	Director	Editor
2011	Not a Love Story		Yes
2012	Department		Yes
2014	Queen		Yes
2014	Blouse		Yes
2014	Poshter Boyz		Yes
2014	Titoo MBA		Yes
2015	Ab Tak Chhappan 2		Yes
2015	Off Road with Gul Panag	Yes	
2019	Rakkhosh	Yes	
