= Vikas Bahl =

Indian filmmaker

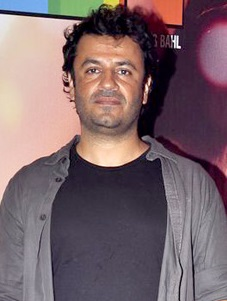
- Bahl in 2014
- Born: 1971 (age 54–55); New Delhi, India
- Occupations: Film director; Film producer; screenwriter
- Years active: 2005–present
- Spouse: Richa Dubey (divorced)

Vikas Bahl is an Indian filmmaker, best known for directing Chillar Party (2011), Queen (2013), Super 30 (2019), and Shaitaan (2024).

== Early life and education ==
Bahl was born and brought up in Lajpat Nagar in Delhi, his father worked with the Indian Oil Corporation. After his schooling from Sardar Patel Vidyalaya and graduation from Ramjas College, Delhi, he moved to Mumbai to pursue an MBA degree from SVKM's NMIMS.

== Career ==
Bahl started his career with advertising, working for several years in client servicing, before joining UTV Spotboy. In 2011, he started Phantom Films, along with Anurag Kashyap, Vikramaditya Motwane and Madhu Mantena. Over the years as a director he has worked with film directors such as Vishal Bhardwaj, Anurag Kashyap, Rajkumar Gupta and Vikramaditya Motwane.

In 2011, Bahl made his directorial debut under UTV Spotboy alongside co-director Nitesh Tiwari with Chillar Party and won the National Film Award for Best Screenplay, with Vijay Maurya. The film also garnered the National Film Award for Best Children's Film. In 2014, he launched his independent directorial venture Queen, starring Kangana Ranaut, which received critical and popular acclaim.

Bahl's 2015 film Shaandar, a destination wedding film, was a flop and received neutral to negative responses. In October 2014, he directed a short film Going Home, featuring Alia Bhatt, on women's safety, which went viral on social media. Bahl next directed a biopic on mathematician and IIT-JEE coach Anand Kumar called Super 30, which featured Hrithik Roshan as Kumar.

Bahl then directed Tiger Shroff starrer Ganapath (2023), which he co-produced with Pooja Entertainment. It was released on 20 October 2023 to highly negative reviews. Bahl's direction was also received mixed to negative remarks. Bollywood Hungama in their review wrote "Vikas Bahl's screenplay is unexciting and direction is not up to the mark. To give credit its due, he has handled a few dramatic moments well." Saibal Chatterjee of NDTV gave 1.5/5 stars and wrote "Ganapath is painfully pea-brained pulp that makes a meal of a terribly thin storyline." Bhavna Agarwal of India Today gave 1.5/5 stars and wrote "'Ganapath' offers absolutely no respite. If you expect it to get better in the second half as Gen Z are often heard saying 'you are in delulu'." Hiren Kotwani of Mid-Day gave 1.5/5 stars and wrote "What makes Ganapath different from the saviour-hero films of yore is that director Bahl has tried to make it look like the desi Mad Max of sorts, albeit with unimpressive design and poor packaging".

== Sexual harassment allegations ==
In October 2018, in an interview with Huffington Post India, a former employee of Phantom Films accused Bahl of sexually harassing her on the set of the 2014 film Queen. Later, the film's lead actress Kangana Ranaut, in support of the former employee, also accused Bahl of sexual misconduct. Following this, Nayani Dixit, Ranaut's co-star in the movie, leveled similar accusations against Bahl. As a result, Phantom Films announced its dissolution on 5 October 2018, largely in response to the sexual assault allegation against Bahl by another former Phantom employee, which was reported in 2015. The other three founders, Kashyap, Motwane, and Mantena, all issued statements on Twitter confirming the company's disbanding and moving on to independent projects. After, Phantom Film subsequently disbanded, and founders Anurag Kashyap and Vikramaditya Motwane made formal statements against Bahl and his sexual misdemeanors. Bahl, in turn, sent them legal notices, citing defamation of character.

== Filmography ==
=== Films ===
| Year | Title | Functioned as | | | Notes |
| Year | Title | Director | Producer | Writer | Notes |
|---|---|---|---|---|---|
| 2008 | Aamir | No | Yes | No | |
| 2008 | Welcome to Sajjanpur | No | Yes | No | |
| 2009 | Dev.D | No | Associate | No | |
| 2009 | Ex Terminators | No | Associate | No | |
| 2010 | Udaan | No | Associate | No | |
| 2011 | No One Killed Jessica | No | Creative | No | |
| 2011 | Thank You | No | Creative | No | |
| 2011 | Chillar Party | Yes | No | Yes | Co-directed with Nitesh Tiwari; also lyricist for song "Liar Liar" |
| 2013 | Lootera | No | Yes | No | |
| 2013 | Hasee Toh Phasee | No | Yes | No | |
| 2014 | Queen | Yes | No | Yes | |
| 2014 | Ugly | No | Yes | No | |
| 2014 | Going Home | Yes | No | Yes | Short film |
| 2015 | NH10 | No | Yes | No | |
| 2015 | Hunterrr | No | Yes | No | |
| 2015 | Masaan | No | Yes | No | |
| 2015 | Shaandaar | Yes | No | Yes | |
| 2016 | Raman Raghav 2.0 | No | Yes | No | |
| 2016 | Wrong Side Raju | No | Yes | No | Gujarati film |
| 2016 | Udta Punjab | No | Yes | No | |
| 2017 | Trapped | No | Yes | No | |
| 2018 | Mukkabaaz | No | Yes | No | |
| 2018 | High Jack | No | Yes | No | |
| 2018 | Manmarziyaan | No | Yes | No | |
| 2019 | Super 30 | Yes | No | No | |
| 2020 | Ghoomketu | No | Yes | No | |
| 2022 | Goodbye | Yes | Yes | Yes | |
| 2023 | Ganapath | Yes | Yes | Yes | |
| 2024 | Shaitaan | Yes | Yes | No | |
| 2026 | Dil Ka Darwaaza Khol Na Darling † | Yes | No | No | Post-production |

=== Television ===
| Year | Title | Functioned as | | | | Notes |
| Year | Title | Director | Producer | Writer | Creator | Notes |
|---|---|---|---|---|---|---|
| 2021–present | Sunflower | Yes | Yes | Yes | Yes | Co-directed season 1 with Rahul Sengupta |
| 2022 | Good Bad Girl | No | Yes | Yes | Yes | |

== Awards and nominations ==
| Award | Year | Category | Nominated work | Result |
|---|---|---|---|---|
| BIG Star Entertainment Awards | 2014 | Most Entertaining Film Director | Queen | Won |
| Bollywood Hungama Surfers' Choice Movie Awards | 2015 | Best Director | Queen | Nominated |
| Filmfare Awards | 2015 | Best Director | Queen | Won |
| Filmfare Awards | 2015 | Best Screenplay | Queen | Nominated (Note: Shared with Chaitally Parmar and Parveez Sheikh) |
| Filmfare Awards | 2017 | Best Film | Udta Punjab | Nominated |
| Ghanta Awards | 2016 | Worst Director | Shaandaar | Won |
| IBNLive Movie Awards | 2015 | Best Director | Queen | Won |
| IIFA Awards | 2015 | Best Director | Queen | Nominated |
| IIFA Awards | 2015 | Best Screenplay | Queen | Won |
| IIFA Awards | 2015 | Best Story | Queen | Won |
| IIFA Awards | 2017 | Best Film | Udta Punjab | Nominated |
| National Film Awards | 2011 | Best Screenplay | Chillar Party | Won (Note: Shared with Nitesh Tiwari and Vijay Maurya) |
| National Film Awards | 2011 | Best Children's Film | Chillar Party | Won |
| National Film Awards | 2014 | Best Features Film in Hindi | Queen | Won |
| Screen Awards | 2015 | Best Director | Queen | Won |
| Screen Awards | 2015 | Best Screenplay | Queen | Nominated |
| Screen Awards | 2017 | Best Film | Udta Punjab | Nominated |
| Stardust Awards | 2014 | Best Director | Queen | Won |
| Star Guild Awards | 2015 | Best Director | Queen | Won |
| Star Guild Awards | 2015 | Best Story | Queen | Won |
| Star Guild Awards | 2015 | Best Screenplay | Queen | Won |
