= Lisa Haydon =

Indian actress, TV presenter and model (born 1986)

Lisa Haydon Lalvani
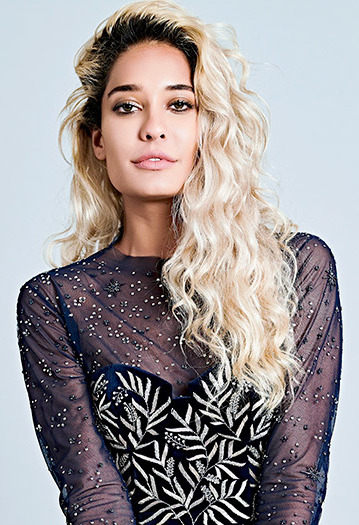
- Haydon in 2018
- Born: Elisabeth Marie Haydon; 17 June 1986 (age 39); Chennai, Tamil Nadu, India
- Other name: Lisa Lalvani
- Occupations: Model, Actress, TV Presenter
- Years active: 2010–2018, 2025
- Spouse: Dino Lalvani (m. 2016)
- Children: 3
- Relatives: Gulu Lalvani (father-in-law)

Elisabeth Marie Haydon, better known as Lisa Haydon Lalvani (born 17 June 1986), is an Indian-Australian actress, TV presenter and model, who mainly appears in Hindi films. Haydon made her acting debut with the ensemble romantic comedy-drama Aisha (2010) and received critical praise for her performance in the comedy-drama Queen, which fetched her wide recognition and a Best Supporting Actress nomination at Filmfare, among other accolades. Haydon later starred in the commercially successful comedy Housefull 3 (2016) and had a brief role in the Karan Johar-directed musical romantic drama Ae Dil Hai Mushkil (2016).

She is a model in India and internationally. She appears on several popular Magazine covers such as Harper's Bazaar, Grazia (India), Cosmopolitan, Elle (India), Verve, Vogue India, Femina (India), FHM, Hello!, and L'Officiel.

== Early life ==
Haydon was born on 17 June 1986 in Madras, India to an Indian father and Australian mother. Her elder sister is model turned DJ Malika Haydon, one half of the DJ duo Nina & Malika. Haydon lived in Australia and the United States, before moving back to India in 2007.

== Career ==
=== Modelling ===
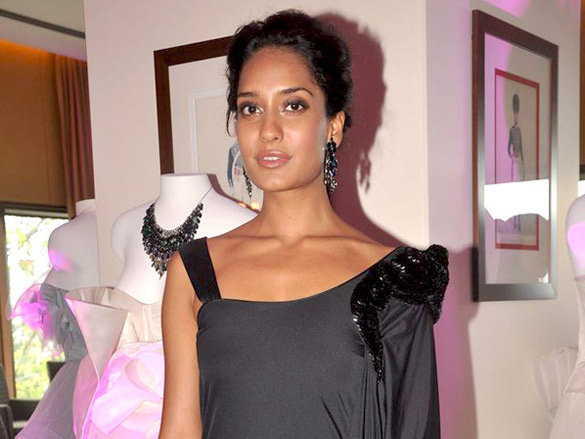
Haydon at Swarovski event in 2012.

Haydon wanted to be a yoga teacher at the age of 18. Studying psychology on the side, she took her friend's suggestion to pursue modelling to pay for the classes and rent. She started modelling in Australia with her first assignment being for stretch mark cream. Encouraged by her sister's modelling acts in India, she moved to India in 2007 to pursue a modelling career there. In India, she has walked the ramp for Wills Lifestyle India Fashion Week (WIFW) and HDIL-India Couture Week(HDIL-ICW). She is also the face of Lakmé. She has also featured in commercials for Hyundai i20, Indigo Nation, Myntra.com and Blender's Pride. In 2010, she did a commercial opposite Hrithik Roshan. With the legendary photographer Peter Lindbergh, she modeled for Nirav Modi along with Rosie Huntington-Whiteley and Andreea Diaconu.

She has featured as cover girl for major fashion magazines like Verve (March 2008, January 2011), Elle (April 2009, May 2009, May 2010, April 2011), Femina (April 2009), Harper's Bazaar (January–February 2010), FHM (August 2010) and Adorn (November–December 2010).

She was named the best model and the most stylish persona in Cosmopolitan Fun and Fearless Awards 2009, DNA most stylish 2009, Marie Claire best model 2010. In 2011, she appeared in the Kingfisher Calendar.

=== Fashion designer ===
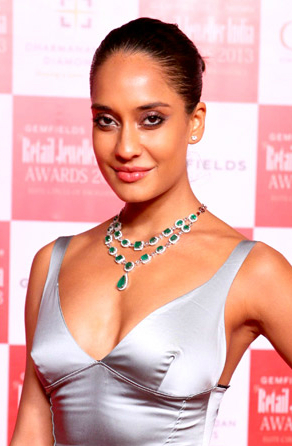
Haydon at the 9th Annual Gemfields & Nazraana Retail Jeweller India Awards 2013

Haydon collaborated with lifestyle brand Sher Singh now acquired by Myntra to launch their first capsule collection inspired by her global style. On 14 February 2012, Sher Singh unveiled its spring collection online. Playful, in pastel, coral and tan, some of the dresses have lace embellishments and can be paired with boots and jackets. Explaining their choice of Lisa, Sunjay Guleria and Sonny Caberwal of Sher Singh reason that Lisa Haydon has a global fashion style with a distinct Indian identity. "Bohemian, jersey for comfort wear and structured cuts, I love it all," Lisa says. "My personal style is the way I'd put an outfit I love together".

The line will not have completely Indian pieces, but will borrow elements for Indian fashion through buttons, embroidery, colors, dyes and fabrics. This is the first time an Indian model and actor is designing her line internationally, along the lines of celebrities such as Kate Moss, Sarah Jessica-Parker and Jennifer Lopez.

=== Films ===
Haydon was spotted by Anil Kapoor in a coffee shop and soon her agent received a phone call for a role in the ensemble romantic comedy-drama Aisha, alongside Sonam Kapoor, Abhay Deol, Ira Dubey, Cyrus Sahukar, Amrita Puri, Anand Tiwari and Arunoday Singh. The film, directed by Rajshree Ojha was loosely based on the Jane Austen's novel Emma and its Hollywood adaptation Clueless; she portrayed Aarti Menon, a New-York returned, white-collared, corporate yuppie and friend/colleague of Deol's character, Arjun Burman. After signing the film, she went to New York City for three months to learn method acting and also received classes on diction in Mumbai. In 2014, Haydon appeared in the coming-of-age dramedy Queen alongside Kangana Ranaut. She played Vijayalakshmi, a single mother who has a child out of wedlock. Haydon's performance was highly praised by critics; Devesh Sharma wrote that she "gives a class act", whilst Rajeev Masand said that she "is a complete revelation in the role of Rani's bohemian Parisian pal, investing the character with both sultriness and genuine affection." The film earned unanimous critical acclaim and was also a box office hit. Her performance in the film earned her a nomination for the Filmfare Award for Best Supporting Actress. Her latest release was The Shaukeens, a remake of the 1982 film Shaukeen opposite Akshay Kumar, Anupam Kher, Annu Kapoor and Piyush Mishra. It was released on 7 November 2014. It took a decent start at the box-office with positive reviews and ended up being an average performer. Haydon also starred in Karan Johar's musical romantic drama Ae Dil Hai Mushkil (2016) alongside Aishwarya Rai Bachchan, Ranbir Kapoor and Anushka Sharma in the lead roles.

=== Television ===
Haydon appeared as the host and headjudge of the first cycle of India's Next Top Model on MTV India.

In 2014, she was seen in the webseries 'The Trip' on Bindass channel.

== Personal life ==
Haydon married Dino Lalvani in October 2016 and together the couple have three children: sons born in 2017 and 2020, and a daughter born in 2021.

She is a trained dancer in Bharatnatyam, which is an Indian classical dance originating in Tamil Nadu.

== Filmography ==
=== Films ===
Year	Title	Role	Notes
2010	Aisha	Aarti Menon	
2011	Rascals	Dolly	
2012	Racha	Herself	Telugu film Cameo appearance in song "Racha"
2014	Queen	Vijayalakshmi	Nominated—Filmfare Award for Best Supporting Actress
2014	The Shaukeens	Ahana	
2016	Santa Banta Pvt Ltd	Queenie "QT" Taneja	
2016	Housefull 3	Jamuna "Jenny" Patel	
2016	Ae Dil Hai Mushkil	Lisa D'Souza	
2025	Aabeer Gulaal	Laila	

=== Television ===
Year	Title	Role	Notes	Ref.
2015-2016	India's Next Top Model	Host/Judge	Season 1 and 2	
2016-2017	The Trip	Shonali		
2018	Top Model India	Host/Judge		

== Awards and nominations ==
Year	Award	Title	Result
2015	Vogue Beauty Award for Best Breakthrough	Queen	Won
2015	Filmfare Award for Best Supporting Actress	Queen	Nominated
2015	IIFA Award for Best Supporting Actress	Queen	Nominated
2015	Screen Award for Best Supporting Actress	Queen	Nominated
2015	Star Guild Award for Best Breakthrough – Female	Queen	Nominated
2017	Indian Television Academy Awards for Best Actor – Female	The Trip	Nominated

== See also ==
- List of Indian film actresses
