= Top Model India season 1 =

Top Model India
- Season 1
- No. of episodes: 10

Release
- Original network: Colors Infinity
- Original release: 4 February – 8 April 2018

Top Model India, season 1 was the first installment of Top Model India. The series premiered on Colors Infinity on 4 February 2018 at 8:00 pm IST (UTC+5:30). Sixteen finalists were chosen to compete for the show.

The winner of the competition was 21-year-old Mahir Pandhi from Delhi. As his prizes, he received a one-year modelling contract with Bling Entertainment Solution.

== Cast ==
=== Contestants ===
Contestant	Age	Height	Hometown	Finish	Place
Nupura Bhaskar	26	1.73 m (5 ft 8 in)	Mumbai	Episode 2	13
Lemuel Huffman	25	1.77 m (5 ft 9 1/2 in)	New York, United States	Episode 3	12
Marina Lang	21	1.70 m (5 ft 7 in)	Manipur	Episode 4	11
Pearl Almeida	24	1.77 m (5 ft 9 1/2 in)	Mumbai	Episode 5	10
Sidharth Neeraj Sharma	27	1.85 m (6 ft 1 in)	Mumbai	Episode 6	9-8
Ram Ramasamy	22	1.83 m (6 ft 0 in)	Mumbai	Episode 6	9-8
Gurin Bal	29	1.77 m (5 ft 9 1/2 in)	Toronto, Canada	Episode 8	7
Rishitha Koruturu	19	1.75 m (5 ft 9 in)	Hyderabad	Episode 9	6-5
Joshua Chhabra	22	1.83 m (6 ft 0 in)	Mumbai	Episode 9	6-5
Satabdi Dutta Banik	22	1.70 m (5 ft 7 in)	Kolkata	Episode 10	4
Aishwarya Suresh	24	1.75 m (5 ft 9 in)	Mumbai	Episode 10	3
Shehzad Deol	25	1.83 m (6 ft 0 in)	New Delhi	Episode 10	2
Mahir Pandhi	21	1.87 m (6 ft 1 1/2 in)	New Delhi	Episode 10	1

=== Judges & Mentor ===
- Lisa Haydon
- Anaita Shroff Adajania
- Atul Kasbekar
- Shibani Dandekar

== Episodes ==
=== Episode 1 ===
Original airdate: 4 February 2018

- Special guest: Dhruv Kapoor

=== Episode 2 ===
Original airdate: 11 February 2018

- First call-out: Gurin Bal
- Bottom two: Joshua Chhabra & Nupura Bhaskar
- Eliminated: Nupura Bhaskar
- Featured photographer: Atul Kasbekar
- Special guest: Ricky Chatterjee

=== Episode 3 ===
Original airdate: 18 February 2018

- First call-out: Joshua Chhabra
- Bottom two: Lemuel Huffman & Marina Lang
- Eliminated: Lemuel Huffman
- Featured photographer: Amit Khanna
- Special guest: Daniel Bauer

=== Episode 4 ===
Original airdate: 25 February 2018

- First call-out: Joshua Chhabra
- Bottom two: Marina Lang & Sidharth Neeraj Sharma
- Eliminated: Marina Lang
- Featured photographer: Toranj Kayvon
- Special guest: Nora Fatehi

=== Episode 5 ===
Original airdate: 4 March 2018

- Entered: Ram Ramasamy
- First call-out: Mahir Pandhi
- Bottom two: Pearl Almeida & Satabdi Dutta Banik
- Eliminated: Pearl Almeida
- Featured photographer: Varun Mehta
- Special guest: Anshuka Parwani

=== Episode 6 ===
Original airdate: 11 March 2018

- Immune: Gurin Bal
- First call-out: Aishwarya Suresh
- Bottom three: Joshua Chhabra, Ram Ramasamy & Sidharth Neeraj Sharma
- Eliminated: Ram Ramasamy & Sidharth Neeraj Sharma

=== Episode 7 ===
Original airdate: 18 March 2018

- First call-out: Shehzad Deol
- Bottom two: Joshua Chhabra & Mahir Pandhi
- Eliminated: None
- Special guest: Miss Malini

=== Episode 8 ===
Original airdate: 25 March 2018

- First call-out: Joshua Chhabra
- Bottom two: Gurin Bal & Rishitha Koruturu
- Eliminated: Gurin Bal

=== Episode 9 ===
Original airdate: 1 April 2018

- First call-out: Mahir Pandhi
- Bottom three: Aishwarya Suresh, Joshua Chhabra & Rishitha Koruturu
- Eliminated: Joshua Chhabra & Rishitha Koruturu
- Special guest: Dino Morea

=== Episode 10 ===
Original airdate: 8 April 2018

- Final four: Aishwarya Suresh, Mahir Pandhi, Satabdi Dutta Banik & Shehzad Deol
- Eliminated outside of judging panel: Satabdi Dutta Banik
- Final three: Aishwarya Suresh, Mahir Pandhi & Shehzad Deol
- Eliminated: Aishwarya Suresh
- Final two: Mahir Pandhi & Shehzad Deol
- Top Model India: Mahir Pandhi
- Special guest: Manish Malhotra, Akash Sharma

== Summaries ==
=== Results ===
Order	Episodes									
Order	1 (Note: In episode 1, the pool of 16 semi-finalists was narrowed down to the top 12 contestants. The first official elimination took place in episode 2.)	2	3	4	5 (Note: In episode 5, Ram was added to the cast as a wildcard contestant.)	6 (Note: In episode 6, Gurin won immunity by winning the challenge.) (Note: In episode 6, Joshua, Ram and Sidharth landed in the bottom three. Ram and Sidharth were both eliminated.)	7 (Note: In episode 7, Mahir and Joshua landed in the bottom two. After Mahir received his picture it was revealed it was a non-elimination.)	8	9 (Note: In episode 9, Aishwarya, Joshua and Rishitha landed in the bottom three. Joshua and Rishitha were both eliminated.)	10 (Note: In episode 10, Satabdi was eliminated outside of judging panel.)
1	Nupura	Gurin	Joshua	Joshua	Mahir	Aishwarya	Shehzad	Joshua	Mahir	Mahir
2	Mahir	Aishwarya	Satabdi	Rishitha	Joshua	Satabdi	Aishwarya	Mahir	Shehzad	Shehzad
3	Aishwarya	Mahir	Sidharth	Satabdi	Aishwarya	Gurin	Satabdi	Aishwarya	Satabdi	Aishwarya
4	Shehzad	Lemuel	Rishitha	Gurin	Sidharth	Mahir	Rishitha	Satabdi	Aishwarya	Satabdi
5	Pearl	Satabdi	Gurin	Mahir	Shehzad	Shehzad	Gurin	Shehzad	Joshua; Rishitha	
6	Sidharth	Shehzad	Shehzad	Shehzad	Rishitha	Rishitha	Joshua; Mahir	Rishitha	Joshua; Rishitha	
7	Rishitha	Pearl	Pearl	Pearl	Ram	Joshua	Joshua; Mahir	Gurin		
8	Lemuel	Sidharth	Mahir	Aishwarya	Gurin	Ram; Sidharth				
9	Satabdi	Rishitha	Aishwarya	Sidharth	Satabdi	Ram; Sidharth				
10	Joshua	Marina	Marina	Marina	Pearl					
11	Marina	Joshua	Lemuel							
12	Gurin	Nupura								

The contestant was eliminated
The contestant was immune from elimination
The contestant was in a non-elimination bottom two
The contestant was eliminated outside of judging panel
The contestant won the competition

=== Photo shoot guide ===
- Episode 1 photo shoot: OPPO selfies (casting)
- Episode 2 photo shoot: Tribal beauty shots with a Tarantula
- Episode 3 photo shoot: Lingerie(By Amante) and Men's Innerwear - in Pairs
- Episode 4 photo shoots: Renault Captur campaign; B&W Photo shoot with Lisa Haydon in Anaita Shroff Adajania's Styling
- Episode 5 photo shoot: Posing With a Horse in White Outfits
- Episode 6 photo shoot: "Raw and Rugged"- Posing and Runway in Desert
- Episode 7 photo shoot: 7 deadly sins - Location: Graveyard
- Episode 8 photo shoot: "SuperHeroes"- Posing in a Vertical Runway with Silk Fabric
- Episode 9 photo shoot: "Back Stage Life"- Wearing Ethnic Designs
- Episode 10 fashion show: Fashion show for Manish Malhotra

== Post–Top Model careers ==
- Nupura Bhaskar signed with Runway Media Management and Ankita Bajaj Casting. She has taken a couple of test shots and walked in fashion show for Schwarzkopf. She has modeled for Amway, Anomaly by Anam, Westside, Oziva Nutrition, Kiddopia, Tata Capital, RAK Ceramics, Art of Living Foundation,... Beside modeling, Bhaskar has appeared in several music videos such as "Gaddiyon Da Vyapar" by Sagar Upadhyay, "Baawla Oont" by Gaurav Panjwanee,... and also pursue an acting career starring on several series such as Thinkistan, Dahan, Chot Si Baat, Jalsa, Shekhar Home, First Copy, Half CA,...
- Lemuel Huffman mainly worked as a stock model, before retired from modeling in 2021.
- Marina Lang has modeled for Ninfa Perez Couture US, Yels Protecta Skincare US,... and walked in fashion shows of Namaslay Collective, Zoe's Vintique,... She has taken a couple of test shots and featured on Bold Journey US July 2023, Shoutout LA US October 2024, Voyage LA US September 2025,... Beside modeling, she has appeared in several music videos such as "New Level" by Archie Smith, several songs by Bhanga Bangla such as "Brown Like Priyanka", "Natok", "Rani", "Jutar Bari",... and is also the co-host of TV series No Worries... Curry! and the co-founder of MMM Productions & Talent in Los Angeles. In 2020, Lang retired from modeling to pursue a music career which she produce several albums.
- Pearl Almeida mainly worked as a stock model. Beside modeling, she has also competed on several competitions such as MTV Ace of Space 2019, Skulls and Roses,... She retired from modeling in 2021.
- Ram Ramasamy has taken a couple of test shots and featured on Chennai Chronicle April 2018. He has modeled for The Chennai Silks, Co-optex, Geospirit Clothing, Purushu Arie, Label Mehul Dangi, Youngsome Activewear, Kalpa Druma, House of Sause, Singarajah London, Zebronics, Idhayam, Cholamandalam, Ambani Tiles,... and walked in fashion shows of Scotch & Soda, Raymond Group, Cadini Srl., Gabicci Shoes, Rare Rabbit, Otto Clothing Store, Hari Anand, Sanjana Jon, Chaitanya Rao, Alka Hari, Manyavar Kharghar, P. N. Rao Suits, Anantham Silks, Lagan Wedding,... Besode modeling, he has also competed on Bigg Boss Tamil 2022 and appeared in several music videos such as "Thara Thara" by Harish Raghavendra & Vishnupriya Krishnakumar, "Oor Kelavi" & "Cosmo Thambi" by A. D. K., "Jaya" by Rajaa Belmir & Omar Belmir,... Ramasamy retired from modeling in 2025.
- Sidharth Sharma signed with Purple Thoughts Model Agency, Toabh Talent Management, Runway Lifestyle Management, Next Muse Agency and The Glamour Calling Agency. He has taken a couple of test shots and appeared on magazine editorials for TMM April 2021, The Times of India October 2021, The Man February 2022,... He has modeled for Garnier, Numero Uno Jeanswear, Regis Clothing, Rare Rabbit, Tisa Studio FW18, Beg Borrow Steal Studio, Reliance Trends, Fila SS19, MensXP Shop, Jade Blue Menswear SS22, Tripole Gears, Chandrika Raamz, Westside, Alter-X Clothing, Cult Sport Store, Interwove Clothing, Ustraa Product, John Jacobs Eyewear, Beyours Clothing, Origin & Ode, Pallavi Agarwal Clothing, Bonsoir Suits, Royal Enfield, Hero MotoCorp, Coca-Cola India,... and walked in fashion shows of FDCI, Manish Malhotra, Suneet Varma, Gaurav Gupta, Michael Cinco, Rohit Bal SS19, Raghavendra Rathore SR19, Antar-Agni WF19, Abraham & Thakore WF19, Tisa Studio, Kanika Goyal WF19, Kunal Rawal SR20, Sahil Aneja, Shantanu & Nikhil, Nehal & Qadir, Son Of A Noble Snob FW22, Shahab Durazi, Pawan Sachdeva, Countrymade IN, Vikram Bajaj, Line Outline Clothing,... Beside modeling, Sharma is also pursue an acting career starring on Puncch Beat.
- Gurin Bal did not pursue modeling after the show.
- Joshua Chhabra signed with Toabh Talent Management. He has taken a couple of test shots and appeared on magazine cover and editorials for Vogue September 2018, Fashion World June 2019, Salysé US August 2019, Filmfare June 2021, The Pioneer January 2023, Perfect Woman March 2023,... He has walked in fashion shows of Jack & Jones, Anees Deen, Wendell Rodricks SS19, JCB Workwear, Gaurav Gupta SR19,... and modeled for Shahista Rizvi Jewellery, Gatsby Wax, Streax Professional, Fancode Shop, Krésha Bajaj, Cult Sport Store, Herbalife, Marriott International,... Beside modeling, Chhabra has also competed on Man of the World 2018 which he places Top 17, competed on MTV Splitsvilla 2022 and appeared in several music videos such as "Selfie Queen" by Punit Sharma, "Bekadra" & "Barbaad" by Ayush Raina,... In 2024, he retired from modeling to pursue an acting career which he starring on Charmsukh, Jurm Aur Jazbaat, C.E.O Atrangii, Audacity Atrangii,...
- Rishitha Koruturu signed with Shaik Rafi's Empire Model Management. She has taken a couple of test shots and featured on Hyderabad Times March 2019. She has walked in fashion shows of Gaurav Gupta, Punit Balana WF18, Shravan Kummar, Zvezda Atelier,... and modeled for Tarun Tahiliani, Apeksha The Label, Jagiri Manasa, Parnicaa Jewellery, Neha Bhatia Label, Mamatha Tulluri, Trisha Trends, Varsana Boutique SS19, Saroj Jalan, Just Like That by Anju Jain, Endless Knot Clothing, Mangatrai Neeraj Jewellery, Ishan Naresh, Xiti Weaves, R.S. Brothers, Loud Mouth Film,... Beside modeling, Koruturu is also pursue an acting career starring in Righto - Lefto on ETV Network.
- Satabdi Banik signed with Toabh Talent Management and A Little Fly Agency. She has walked in fashion show for Pria Kataaria Puri and appeared on magazine editorials for Hair October 2018, Apparel CMAI #1 January 2020,... She has taken a couple of test shots and modeled for Lashkaraa, Myntra, Kiehl's, My Glamm, Natasha Dalal Label, Divya Sheth, Nykaa Design Studio, Drishti & Zahabia, JCS Jewel Creations, Rimi Nayak, Rambhajo's, FAD International, Shilpi Gupta, Shruti Ranka, Lisén Skincare, Coloroso Weaves, Indethnic Brand, Quirky Bae Winter 2022, Bholi Sarees by Vartika, Gulmohar Calcutta, Urban Pataka, Suman Nathwani, Dev R Nil, Goddess Of Glocal, Impakto Shoes, Tan & Loom, Piqnique, Weavers Studio, Neetika Swarup, Shop Miri Bags Fall 2024, Kanchana Next, Trends Stores, Baglo Bags, Freakins Denim, My Gossip Jewellery, Theater XYZ, Serenity Jewels, Shop Amoh, Karomi Crafts, Savana UK, Chocolush, Lay’s, Inkbolt Tattoos,... Beside modeling, Dutta has also appeared in music video "Aami Kaafi" by Jacqueline Fernandez.
- Aishwarya Suresh has taken a couple of test shots and modeled for Cetaphil, Wendell Rodricks, Myme By Shubhra & Ishaanee, Label Jiyani, Bodd Active, Hiranandani Group,... She retired from modeling in 2022.
- Shehzad Deol has taken a couple of test shots, featured on Hindustan Times April 2018, walked in fashion show for Mehraab by Arun & John and modeled for 100 Pipers, Royal Stag,... Beside modeling, he has appeared in music video "Gulabi Rang" by Nimrat Khaira and also competed on MTV Ace of Space 2018, Bigg Boss 2020,... He retired from modeling in 2020.
- Mahir Pandhi has collected his prizes and signed with Bling Entertainment Solution. He has taken a couple of test shots and modeled for Siddartha Tytler. He did not pursue a modeling career but an acting career which he starring on Choti Sarrdaarni, Pawan & Pooja, Bebaakee, Chakravyuh, Jee Karda, Congrats My Ex!, Vanshaj, Veer Hanuman, Kasba Singhai Kheri, Daniel,...
