= India's Next Top Model =

Indian reality television series

- Genre: Reality television; Competition
- Created by: Tyra Banks
- Presented by: Lisa Haydon (season 1–2); Malaika Arora (season 3–4)
- Judges: Lisa Haydon (season 1–2); Malaika Arora (season 3–4); Dabboo Ratnani; Milind Soman (season 3–4)
- Country of origin: India
- Original languages: English; Hindi
- No. of seasons: 5
- No. of episodes: 31

Production
- Executive producers: Akash Sharma, Ramit B. Mittal
- Production company: Bulldog Media

Original release
- Network: MTV India
- Release: 19 July 2015 – 15 December 2018

India's Next Top Model is an Indian reality television series, which premiered on 19 July 2015 and broadcast on MTV India. The series is an Indian version of Tyra Banks-created 2003 American reality television series America's Next Top Model. The viewers see several women compete for the title of India's Next Top Model, providing them with an opportunity to begin their career in the modeling industry.

The Head judge/Host of the series is Lisa Haydon later Malaika Arora, Judged by Dabboo Ratnani, Milind Soman (seasons 3–4) And mentored by image consultant and grooming expert Neeraj Gaba and Anusha Dandekar. Bulldog Media & Entertainment had licensed the format rights from CBS Television Distribution and the series was premiered on 19 July 2015 on MTV India.

The show got rebooted into a new format in 2018 named Top Model India season 1 on Colors Infinity, sister channel of MTV India that included both men and women competing for the title whereas MTV India created a new version for female only models called MTV Supermodel of the Year.

== Judges and mentors ==
Judge/Mentor	Cycle			
Judge/Mentor	1	2	3	4
Hosts
Lisa Haydon	Head Judge	Head Judge		
Malaika Arora			Head Judge	Head Judge
Judging Panelists
Milind Soman			Main	Main
Dabboo Ratnani	Main	Main	Main	Main
Anusha Dandekar	Mentor	Mentor	Mentor	Mentor
Neeraj Gabba	Mentor	Mentor	Mentor	Mentor

== Cycles ==
Cycle	Premiere date	Winner	Runner-up	Other contestants in order of elimination	Number of contestants	International Destinations
1	19 July 2015	Danielle Canute	Rushali Rai	Vishakha Bharadwaj (quit), Neev Marcel, Sreeradhe Khanduja, Anam Shaikh, Malvika Sitlani, Aditi Shetty, Monica Gill, Gloria Tep	10	None
2	10 July 2016	Pranati Prakash	Jantee Hazarika	Ashmita Jaggi, Minash Ravuthar, Ritija Malvankar, Rajashree Singha & Poulomi Das, Neelam Virwani, Priya Banerjee & Akanksha Sharma, Subhamita Banerjee	11	None
3	21 October 2017	Riya Subodh	Sabita Karki	Bhanu Chaudhary, Madhurima Roy, Tanishq Sharma & Summer Jacobs, Aakriti Anand Singh, Akanksha Corda, Parina Chopra & Eva Aario, Shweta Raj	11	None
4	6 October 2018	Urvi Shetty	Nisha Yadav	Rhea Resham Bari, Shefali Sharma & Aishwarya Jagtap, Shalu Ojha, Malaica Kokane, Aasma Qureshi, Riya Bhattacherjee, Kat Kristian, Tamanna Sharma, Rushali Yadav	12	Singapore

== See also ==
- Top Model India
- MTV Supermodel of the Year
