= India's Next Top Model season 2 =

India's Next Top Model
- Season 2
- No. of episodes: 11

Release
- Original network: MTV India
- Original release: 10 July – 11 September 2016

Season chronology
- ← Previous; Season 1 Next → Season 3

India's Next Top Model, season 2 is the second installment of India's Next Top Model. It premiered on MTV India on 10 July 2016 at 7:00 pm IST (UTC+5:30). Eleven finalists were chosen to compete for the show. Lisa Haydon reprised her role as the host/head judge along with judge Dabboo Ratnani, and mentor Neeraj Gaba.

Among with the prizes was a one-year modelling contract with Bling Talent Management, the opportunity to appear in an editorial spread for Cosmopolitan magazine, a one-year contract with Livon Serum, a campaign for Abof.com website and a jewelry gift from PC Jeweler.

The winner of the competition was 21 year-old Pranati Prakash from Patna.

== Cast ==
=== Contestants ===
Contestant	Age	Height	Hometown	Finish	Place
Ashmita Jaggi	26	1.73 m (5 ft 8 in)	Mumbai	Episode 3	11
Minash Ravuthar	23	1.75 m (5 ft 9 in)	Mumbai	Episode 4	10
Ritija Malvankar	21	1.75 m (5 ft 9 in)	Mumbai	Episode 5	9
Rajashree Singha	21	1.72 m (5 ft 7 1/2 in)	Guwahati	Episode 7	8–7
Poulomi Das	20	1.70 m (5 ft 7 in)	Kolkata	Episode 7	8–7
Neelam Virwani	22	1.85 m (6 ft 1 in)	Pune	Episode 8	6
Akanksha Sharma	20	1.70 m (5 ft 7 in)	Gurgaon	Episode 9	5–4
Priya Banerjee	23	1.75 m (5 ft 9 in)	San Francisco, United States	Episode 9	5–4
Subhamita Banerjee	26	1.70 m (5 ft 7 in)	Kolkata	Episode 10	3
Jantee Hazarika	22	1.68 m (5 ft 6 in)	Guwahati	Episode 10	2
Pranati Prakash	21	1.73 m (5 ft 8 in)	Patna	Episode 10	1

=== Judges and mentors ===
- Lisa Haydon - presenter / head judge
- Dabboo Ratnani - judge
- Neeraj Gaba - mentor and image consultant

== Episodes ==
=== Episode 1 ===
Original airdate: 10 July 2016

- Summary: This was the casting episode.

=== Episode 2 ===
Original airdate: 17 July 2016

- First call-out: Subhamita Banerjee
- Bottom four: Ana Chawdhary, Lekha Prajapati, Pranati Prakash and Raavi Ambiger
- Eliminated: Ana Chawdhary, and Raavi Ambiger
- Featured photographer: Dabboo Ratnani

=== Episode 3 ===
Original airdate: 24 July 2016

During this episode, makeovers occurred. Akanksha's long hair was cut as a short pixie cut. She wept after being forced to having the haircut. Also, Pranati's long black hair was cut as a auburn lob with bangs. After makeover, the models have a cover shoot for a Livon Serum product and they also have to decide which one out of three photos should be used for the packaging. And that will be the photo the judges assess at deliberation.

At judging, Lisa Haydon tells them disappointingly that they have chosen photos that accentuate their own strengths, instead of sell the product for the client. But with Neelam, this smart and ambitious girl puts a smile on Lisa’s face by scoring best photo two weeks in a row and even the client calls her picture "fabulous". Priya has once again ended up in bottom two with Minash, whose mature look and average photo only manage to yield a lukewarm response from the judges. Faced with a tough decision, Lisa eventually gives Priya one more chance to translate her passion for modelling into her photoshoots.

- Challenge winner/Immune: Pranati Prakash
- First call-out: Neelam Virwani
- Bottom two: Ashmita Jaggi and Priya Banerjee
- Eliminated: Ashmita Jaggi
- Guest judge: Manish Malhotra

=== Episode 4 ===
Original airdate: 30 July 2016

- Wildcard Entry: Ritija Malvankar
- First call-out: Neelam Virwani
- Bottom two: Minash Ravuthar and Priya Banerjee
- Eliminated: Minash Ravuthar
- Guest judge: Hardee Shah

=== Episode 5 ===
Original airdate: 7 August 2016

- Challenge winner: Rajashree Singha and Poulomi Das
- First call-out: Rajashree Singha
- Bottom two: Pranati Prakash and Ritija Malvankar
- Eliminated: Ritija Malvankar
- Special guest: Ricky Singh
- Featured photographer: Nuno Oliveira and Ashish Chawla
- Guest judge: Upen Patel

=== Episode 6 ===
Original airdate: 14 August 2016

Model	Theme
Akanksha	Bubble wrap
Jantee	Plastic toys
Neelam	Compact discs
Poulomi	Plastic spoons
Pranati	Newspaper
Priya	Cassette reel
Rajashree	Party curtains
Subhamita	Plastic cups

- Challenge winner: Jantee Hazarika and Pranati Prakash
- Immune: Jantee Hazarika
- First call-out: Pranati Prakash
- Bottom two: Poulomi Das and Subhamita Banerjee
- Eliminated: None
- Guest judge: Shalmali Kholgade

=== Episode 7 ===
Original airdate: 21 August 2016

- Challenge winner: Jantee Hazarika
- First call-out: Pranati Prakash
- Bottom three: Neelam Virwani, Poulomi Das, Rajashree Singha
- Eliminated: Poulomi Das and Rajashree Singha
- Guest judge: Milind Soman

=== Episode 8 ===
Original airdate: 28 August 2016

- Challenge winner: Akanksha Sharma
- First call-out: Akanksha Sharma
- Bottom two: Jantee Hazarika and Neelam Virwani
- Eliminated: Neelam Virwani
- Featured photographer: Vinit Bhatt
- Guest judge: Manish Paul

=== Episode 9 ===
Original airdate: 4 September 2016

- Challenge winner: None
- First call-out: Jantee Hazarika
- Bottom three: Akanksha Sharma, Subhamita Banergee and Priya Banerjee
- Eliminated: Akanksha Sharma and Priya Banerjee
- Featured photographer: Dabboo Ratnani
- Guest judge: Neha Dhupia

=== Episode 10 ===
Original airdate: 11 September 2016

- Final three: Jantee Hazarika, Pranati Prakash and Subhamita Banerjee
- Eliminated: Subhamita Banerjee
- Final two: Jantee Hazarika and Pranati Prakash
- India's Next Top Model: Pranati Prakash

== Summaries ==
=== Call-out order ===
Order	Episodes								
Order	2	3 (Note: In episode 3, Pranati was immune from elimination for winning the challenge.)	4 (Note: In episode 4, Ritija entered the competition as a wildcard contestant.)	5	6 (Note: In episode 6, Jantee was immune from elimination. Poulomi and Subhamita landed in the bottom two but were both saved.)	7	8	9	10
1	Subhamita	Pranati	Neelam	Rajashree	Jantee	Pranati	Akanksha	Jantee	Pranati
2	Akanksha	Neelam	Pranati	Poulomi	Pranati	Akanksha	Pranati	Pranati	Jantee
3	Rajashree	Subhamita	Poulomi	Jantee	Akanksha	Subhamita	Priya	Subhamita	Subhamita
4	Poulomi	Akanksha	Akanksha	Priya	Rajashree	Jantee	Subhamita	Akanksha; Priya	
5	Minash	Rajashree	Subhamita	Akanksha	Priya	Priya	Jantee	Akanksha; Priya	
6	Priya	Minash	Rajashree	Subhamita	Neelam	Neelam	Neelam		
7	Jantee	Jantee	Ritija	Neelam	Poulomi; Subhamita	Poulomi; Rajashree			
8	Neelam	Poulomi	Jantee	Pranati	Poulomi; Subhamita	Poulomi; Rajashree			
9	Pranati	Priya	Priya	Ritija					
10	Ashmita	Ashmita	Minash						

The contestant was eliminated
The contestant was immune from the elimination
The contestant was in a non-elimination bottom two
The contestant won the competition

=== Photo shoot guide ===
- Episode 1 photo shoot: Harnessed in the sky (casting)
- Episode 3 runway show: Manish Malhotra bridal collection
- Episode 4 photo shoot: Livon serum campaign
- Episode 5 photo shoots: Posing on a horse with a male model; Giants wearing Amante lingerie
- Episode 6 photo shoots: Acrobats on a trapeze; Recyclable materials
- Episode 7 runway show: Fire runway
- Episode 8 commercial & photo shoot: Livon serum commercial; Jewelry beauty shots with a tarantula
- Episode 9 photo shoots: Bats hanging upside down; Posing with Lisa Haydon
- Episode 10 runway show: Lakme Fashion Week 2016
