= India's Next Top Model season 4 =

India's Next Top Model
- Season 4
- Starring: Malaika Arora; Dabboo Ratnani; Milind Soman
- No. of episodes: 11

Release
- Original network: MTV India
- Original release: 6 October – 15 December 2018

Season chronology
- ← Previous; Season 3

India's Next Top Model, season 4 is the fourth installment of India's Next Top Model. It premiered on MTV India on 6 Oct 2018.

Among with the prizes was a one-year modelling contract with Exceed Entertainment, a portfolio shoot with Dabboo Ratnani, a one-year contract with Viacom 18 and a 5-night stay in Hong Kong by Dream Cruises. Beside, the winner also receive: a Golds Gym VIP membership card worth 100.000Rs, a voucher from Biguine Paris and a gift of Livon Serum.

The winner of the competition was 22 year-old Urvi Shetty from Mumbai.

== Contestants ==
(Ages stated are at start of contest)

Contestant	Age	Height	Hometown	Finish	Place
Rhea Resham Bari	22	1.74 m (5 ft 8 1/2 in)	Odisha	Episode 2	12
Shefali Sharma	22	1.75 m (5 ft 9 in)	Himachal	Episode 3	11-10
Aishwarya Jagtap	21	1.79 m (5 ft 10 1/2 in)	Nashik	Episode 3	11-10
Shalu Ojha	20	1.74 m (5 ft 8 1/2 in)	Vadodara	Episode 4	9
Malaica Kokane	22	1.90 m (6 ft 3 in)	Mumbai	Episode 6	8
Aasma Qureshi	26	1.75 m (5 ft 9 in)	Mumbai	Episode 7	7
Riya Bhattacherjee	23	1.73 m (5 ft 8 in)	Kolkata	Episode 8	6
Kat Kristian	21	1.70 m (5 ft 7 in)	Assam	Episode 9	5
Tamanna Sharma	23	1.78 m (5 ft 10 in)	Jaipur	Episode 9	4
Rushali Yadav	21	1.76 m (5 ft 9 1/2 in)	Ajmer	Episode 10	3
Nisha Yadav	24	1.80 m (5 ft 11 in)	Jaipur	Episode 10	2
Urvi Shetty	22	1.73 m (5 ft 8 in)	Mumbai	Episode 10	1

== Episodes ==
No. overall	No. in season	Title	Original release date
32	1	"First day, first challenge!"	6 October 2018
Casting episode. 23 aspiring models were selected from around the country and had met Malaika Arora and the judges. Malaika immediately shocked the girls when she told them that the top 5 finalists will be going to Singapore by Dream Cruises and the prizes for the winner. They were asked to let the panel know who was their biggest competition. Accordingly they were paired with their competition. Shefali was the one who had not been selected by any other girl. In their very first Bikini Runway, the contestants walked with their partners and there was an immediate elimination of 7 girls. The remaining sixteen girls had a personal interview with the panel and thus the Top 11 girls were chosen for the main competition.: Featured Guest: Ayushmann Khurrana
33	2	"Lights, camera... Fire it up!"	13 October 2018
The top 11 entered the Top Model House. The very first challenge they faced in the competition was an underwater photo shoot where they were dressed as mermaids. Mentor Anusha announced Tamanna as the challenge winner and had given her a special power. At the photo shoot with Milind Soman, Tamanna used her power and chose Nisha and Urvi for a disadvantage. The disadvantage was that they will be blindfolded. At judging, the two disadvantaged models came to be the best performers. Tamanna's given disadvantage proved to be their advantage. Tamanna and Shalu were criticised; the former for her overconfidence in the shoot and the latter for giving up because of the fire. Malaika impressed the judges and Aasma was told to be more confident. At deliberation, Urvi won the best performance, Aishwarya & Rhea landed in the bottom 2 both for their mediocre and blank shots. In the end, Aishwarya deemed to have more potential and Rhea became the first contestant to leave the competition.
34	3	"Episode 3"	20 October 2018
The remaining models faced their next challenge which was a bubble runway challenge. Earlier, models were asked to write the name of the weakest model in the competition according to them. Rushali stood out as the challenge winner as she had the perfect walk. Model Mentor Mr.Gaba announced who was the weak contestant according to the majority : Aasma. Aasma and Rushali were given power for their next Photo Shoot. In the photoshoot, Rushali and Aasma were asked to choose their partners who will be featuring with them in the photoshoot. The Pairs were: Tamanna and Aasma; Urvi and Rushali; Malaica and Shalu; Riya and Nisha; Shefali and Aishwarya; They had to pose in a cage with two snakes. In the judgement day, Malaika Arora announced that the judgement will be done on the basis of the pair as a whole. As Aasma and Rushali had the power to get immune, the panel decided that Tamanna and Aasma should get the immunity as far their photographs say. They were also the best performers, Aishwarya, Rushali, Shefali & Urvi landed in the bottom 4. In the end, Shefali & Aishwarya became the next contestant to leave the competition in the double elimination. After The elimination was over, Kat Kristian entered the competition as a Livon Serum Wild Card Entrant.: Featured Guest: Karan Kundra, Dino Morea
35	4	"Episode 4"	27 October 2018
It was time for the makeovers. Daniel Bauer's team designed makeovers for the models. Urvi's long hair was cut too short, seeing her condition other models got afraid of their turn. Kat decided not to cut her hair as a boy and asked Model mentor Anusha for help. She was then given a different makeover. The next day, they were up for their challenge which was a Mid Air Runway at 40 feet height, wearing high fashion clothes. Urvi helped Kat in the rehearsals. Kat in her very first challenge aced her walk. Panel was surprised seeing her performance and decided that Kat deserved to be the best performer. However, Shalu quit to walk and was therefore eliminated when was in the bottom 2 with Malaica.
36	5	"Episode 5"	3 November 2018
MTV boys arrived at the model house and the girls were surprised as they woke up. There was a chit-chat going on at the swimming pool. Meanwhile, the boys tried to impress the girls. At the challenge, Mr. Gaba asked the girls to declare their partner's name for a photoshoot where they have to pose on top of the disco ball. The pairs were: Rushali and Navi; Urvi and Kashish; Malaica and Lalit; Riya and Mohit; Kat and Nishkarsh; Tamanna and Aviral; Aasma and Rizwan; Nisha and Chetan; Milind gave a special power to Urvi as her performance was the best among all.: Featured Guest: Aviral Gupta, Chetan Titre, Kashish Thakur, Lalit Chaudhary, Mohit Duseja, Navi Arora, Nishkarsh Arora, Rizwan Sikander
37	6	"Episode 6"	10 November 2018
Episode 6 was the next half of Episode 5. The models had to pose in pairs against each other in a rotating wheel. It was a Livon Serum casting photo shoot. The pairs were decided by Urvi as she had the power. The pairs were: Urvi and Kat; Nisha and Riya; Tamanna and Aasma; Malaica and Rushali; The brief was to be fun and girl next door. Rushali proved herself and gave a super cool pose, Malaica & Nissha landed in the bottom 2. At the end, it was time for Malaica to leave the competition.
38	7	"Episode 7"	17 November 2018
In episode 7, the girls had to pose as Super Woman while free falling from the 4th Floor of a building in explosion. Later they had a special task of dance performances where they were judged on the basis of their expressions. They danced on famous Bollywood tracks. At the judging, Urvi wowed the judges with her dance performance and Kat was appreciated for her Super Woman picture, Aasma & Riya landed in the bottom 2. In the end, Aasma became the next contestant to leave the competition.: Featured Guest: Sunny Leone
39	8	"Episode 8"	24 November 2018
The 6 remaining girl got a tasks was all about editorial and commercial which started from a self-styling challenge after which they had to stand as mannequins in front of the public in a Forever 21 shopping mall. There were two teams: Nisha, Urvi and Tamanna; Riya, Kat and Rushali; The winning team was Team Nisha, which meant that there would be an Escalator Runway challenge. Urvi won the task and got a voucher. The next day, they have a Livon Serum commercial where they have to direct their partner. The pairs were: Urvi and Tamanna; Nisha and Kat; Riya and Rushali; At deliberation, Kat won the best performance, Riya & Tamanna landed in the bottom 2. In the end, Riya became the next contestant to leave the competition.: Featured Guest: Kainaz Karmakar
40	9	"Episode 9"	1 December 2018
The final 5 flown to Singapore and enter the Dream Cruises cruiseship. They had a fun party at night until Anusha and Neeraj told them that they just do the secret photoshoot that they were party while have been capture the photo by the paparazzi, and 1 girl will be eliminated tomorrow. At the end, it was Kat had to say goodbye. The 4 remaining had a fashion show on the cruiseship. At deliberation, Nisha became the first finalist in the competition, next is Rushali, Tamanna & Urvi landed in the bottom 2. In the end, Tamanna became the next contestant to leave the competition.
41	10	"Episode 10"	8 December 2018
The final 3 had their final photoshoot where they will pose on swimsuit with Malaika Arora. At the show lounge of Dream Cruises, the judges and the top 3 had been introduced to the audience, at the top 3 runway presentation, Nisha dress got stuck at the stage which made her crying behind the stage. At the final judging, the girls look back at their photo shoots from the beginning to their final shot. At the end, Rushali became the 2-runner up, Nisha was the runner-up and Urvi became the next India's Next Top Model.
42	11	"Episode 11"	15 December 2018
Recap episode and highlight from the entire competition.

== Results ==
Order	Episodes									
Order	1	2	3	4	6	7	8	9		10
1	Nisha	Urvi	Tamanna; Aasma	Kat	Rushali	Urvi	Kat	Nisha	Nisha	Urvi
2	Malaica	Nisha	Tamanna; Aasma	Urvi	Kat	Kat	Urvi	Tamanna	Rushali	Nisha
3	Tamanna	Malaica	Malaica; Shalu	Rushali	Riya	Tamanna	Nisha	Rushali	Urvi	Rushali
4	Riya	Aasma	Malaica; Shalu	Tamanna	Tamanna	Rushali	Rushali	Urvi	Tamanna	
5	Aishwarya	Tamanna	Nisha; Riya	Aasma	Urvi	Nisha	Tamanna	Kat		
6	Shefali	Rushali	Nisha; Riya	Riya	Aasma	Riya	Riya			
7	Rhea	Shalu	Rushali; Urvi	Nisha	Nisha	Aasma				
8	Urvi	Riya	Rushali; Urvi	Malaica	Malaica					
9	Rushali	Shefali	Aishwarya; Shefali	Shalu						
10	Shalu	Aishwarya	Aishwarya; Shefali							
11	Aasma	Rhea								

The contestant was eliminated
The contestant was immune
The contestant was eliminated outside of judging panel
The contestant won the competition

- In episode 3 after judging had concluded, Kat entered the competition as a wildcard contestant.
- Episode 11 was a recap episode.
- In episode 9 the first call out order did not reflect their performances.

=== Photo shoots ===
- Episode 1 runway: Bikini Runway in Pairs (Casting)
- Episode 2 photo shoot: Posing around fire with Milind Soman
- Episode 3 photo shoot: Posing with Snakes in a Cage in pairs
- Episode 4 runway: Mid Air Runway on a 40 feet high ramp
- Episode 5 photo shoot: Disco Nights with male models
- Episode 6 photo shoot: Posing in Pairs on a rotating wheel
- Episode 7 photo shoot and Challenge: "Super Woman" Photoshoot; Bollywood Dance Performances
- Episode 8 commercial: Livon Serum Commercial (Self Direction)
- Episode 9 runway: Foam Party on a Cruise
- Episode 10 photo shoot: Swimsuit in the pool with Malaika Arora
