= India's Next Top Model season 1 =

India's Next Top Model
- Season 1
- No. of episodes: 11

Release
- Original network: MTV India
- Original release: 19 July – 27 September 2015

Season chronology
- Next → Season 2

India's Next Top Model, season 1 was the first installment of India's Next Top Model. The series premiered on MTV India on 19 July 2015 at 7:00 pm IST (UTC+5:30). Ten finalists were chosen to compete for the show.

Among with the prizes was a one-year contract to be the new face of TRESemmé, representation from Bling Talent Management, and the opportunity to appear in an editorial spread for Grazia magazine.

The winner of the competition was 18 year-old Danielle Canute from Mumbai.

== Cast ==
=== Contestants ===
Contestant	Age	Hometown	Finish	Place
Vishakha Bharadwaj	23	Delhi	Episode 3	10 (quit)
Neev Marcel	24	Goa	Episode 3	9
Sreeradhe Khanduja	20	Allahabad	Episode 4	8
Anam Shaikh	22	Mumbai	Episode 6	7
Malvika Sitlani	22	Mumbai	Episode 7	6
Aditi Shetty	22	Mumbai	Episode 8	5
Monica Gill	25	Boston, United States	Episode 9	4
Gloria Tep	23	Tseminyu	Episode 11	3
Rushali Rai	20	Delhi	Episode 11	2
Danielle Canute	18	Mumbai	Episode 11	1

=== Judges & Mentors ===
- Lisa Haydon - presenter / head judge
- Dabboo Ratnani - judge
- Neeraj Gaba - mentor / image consultant

== Episodes ==
No. overall	No. in season	Title	Original release date
1	1	"Episode 1"	19 July 2015
The chosen 13 semi-finalists converged in Mumbai and met the panel for one on one interviews. At the end of the sessions, Lisa Haydon revealed that only 10 contestanst would be selected to continue on in the competition.
2	2	"Episode 2"	26 July 2015
The final 13 took part in a self styled rooftop photo shoot with judge Dabboo Ratnani. After deliberating on the final photos, the judges chose the top 10.: Featured photographer: Dabboo Ratnani
3	3	"Episode 3"	2 August 2015
The remaining contestants moved into the model house, and had an underwater photo shoot challenge. They were later paired off for a photo shoot in which they had to mimic each other's poses on opposite sides of a mirror frame as they tried to sell Lakmé's new matte lipstick.: Featured photographers:Nitin Patel, Ujjwala Raut; Special guests: Anees Adenwala
4	4	"Episode 4"	9 August 2015
The models arrived at a fish market, and were introduced to model Alesia Raut for a catwalk lesson. In a runway show that would replace the week's photo shoot, the contestants had to walk wearing headdresses designed by Little Shilpa as they avoided swinging pendulums.: Special guests: Alesia Raut, Achala Sachdev, Little Shilpa
5	5	"Episode 5"	16 August 2015
The final seven received makeovers, and later had to model outrageous hairstyles on miniature sets for a beauty shoot.: Featured photographer: Omkar Chitnis; Special guests: Daniel Bauer, Atul Kasbekar
6	6	"Episode 6"	23 August 2015
The models met Neeraj Gaba and makeup expert Clint Fernandes at the Lakmé Absolute Salon for a makeup lesson and challenge, and later shot TV commercials for TRESemmé's new Keratin Smooth shampoo.: Featured director: Prahlad Kakkar; Special guests: Clint Fernandes, Javed Jaffrey
7	7	"Episode 7"	30 August 2015
8	8	"Episode 8"	6 September 2015
9	9	"Episode 9"	13 September 2015
10	10	"Episode 10"	20 September 2015
11	11	"Episode 11"	27 September 2015

== Results ==
Order	Episodes								
Order	2	3	4	5	6	7	8	9	11
1	Rushali	Monica; Sreeradhe	Danielle	Rushali	Monica	Danielle	Gloria	Danielle	Danielle
2	Anam	Monica; Sreeradhe	Anam	Aditi	Rushali	Gloria	Monica	Gloria	Rushali
3	Danielle	Gloria	Malvika	Gloria	Gloria	Rushali	Rushali	Rushali	Gloria
4	Malvika	Danielle; Rushali	Rushali	Danielle	Danielle	Aditi	Danielle	Monica	
5	Aditi	Danielle; Rushali	Aditi	Malvika	Aditi	Monica	Aditi		
6	Monica	Aditi; Anam	Gloria	Anam; Monica	Malvika	Malvika			
7	Vishakha	Aditi; Anam	Monica	Anam; Monica	Anam				
8	Neev	Malvika	Sreeradhe						
9	Sreeradhe	Neev							
10	Gloria	Vishakha							

The contestant was eliminated
The contestant quit the competition
The contestant was part of a non-elimination bottom two
The contestant won the competition

=== Photo shoot guide ===
- Episode 2 photo shoot: Styling oneself on a rooftop (casting)
- Episode 3 photo shoot: Paired between a mirror selling Lakmé Matte Lipstick
- Episode 4 runway show: Swinging pendulum wearing headdresses
- Episode 5 photo shoot: Outrageous hairstyles in restricted spaces
- Episode 6 commercial: Keratin smooth shampoo by TRESemmé
- Episode 7 photo shoots: Posing as a statue with a male model; mannequins with Cyrus Broacha
- Episode 8 photo shoot: Embodying different personalities with props
- Episode 9 photo shoot: Superheroes harnessed in front of the night sky
- Episode 11 runway show: Lakme Fashion Week 2015
