= India's Next Top Model season 3 =

India's Next Top Model
- Season 3
- Starring: Malaika Arora; Dabboo Ratnani; Neeraj Gaba
- No. of episodes: 10

Release
- Original network: MTV India
- Original release: 21 October – 23 December 2017

Season chronology
- ← Previous; Season 2 Next → Season 4

India's Next Top Model, season 3 is the third installment of India's Next Top Model, which premiered on 21 October 2017, at 7:00 pm IST (UTC+5:30) on MTV India. The Season 3 judges were Malaika Arora, Milind Soman and Dabboo Ratnani.

The winner of the competition was 20-year-old Riya Subodh from Ahmedabad, who was awarded a one-year talent contract with MTV India.

== Cast ==
=== Contestants ===
Contestant	Age	Height	Hometown	Finish	Place
Bhanu Chaudhary	24	1.73 m (5 ft 8 in)	Himachal Pradesh	Episode 2	11
Madhurima Roy	26	1.68 m (5 ft 6 in)	Kolkata	Episode 3	10
Summer Jacobs	20	1.68 m (5 ft 6 in)	Pune	Episode 5	8-9
Tanishq Sharma	22	1.70 m (5 ft 7 in)	Oman	Episode 5	8-9
Aakriti Singh	28	1.78 m (5 ft 10 in)	Jaipur	Episode 6	7
Akanksha Corda	20	1.70 m (5 ft 7 in)	Mumbai	Episode 7	6
Eva Aario	19	1.73 m (5 ft 8 in)	Guwahati	Episode 8	5-4
Parina Chopra	22	1.68 m (5 ft 6 in)	New Delhi	Episode 8	5-4
Shweta Raj	21	1.75 m (5 ft 9 in)	Pune	Episode 9	3
Sabita Karki	22	1.73 m (5 ft 8 in)	Kathmandu, Nepal	Episode 9	2
Riya Subodh	20	1.72 m (5 ft 7 1/2 in)	Ahmedabad	Episode 9	1

=== Judges and mentors ===
- Malaika Arora - presenter / head judge
- Milind Soman - judge
- Dabboo Ratnani - judge
- Neeraj Gaba - mentor and image consultant

== Episodes ==
=== Episode 1: Casting ===
Original airdate: 21 October 2017

This was the casting episode. The 16 semi-finalists had a runway show at Club Sirkus, Mumbai for designer Gabriella Demetriades. Later, one by one had an interview with the judges.

=== Episode 2: Posing ===
Original airdate: 28 October 2017

The top sixteen semi-finalists were narrowed down to the top 10 who moved into the model villa. Then remaining contestants had a challenge where they were paired up and had a photo shoot on stilts. Erika Packard was a guest mentor for this photo shoot. The pairs were Eva & Parina, Aakriti & Akanksha, Summer & Madhurima, Bhanu & Sabita and Shweta & Riya. After that the girls had an Underwater photo shoot with male model and judge Milind Soman. Each girl got only 3 dives. As Aakriti & Akanksha won the challenge, they got a special advantage by having 4 dives but that to steal 1 dive from one of the fellow models. Akanksha chose Eva & Aakriti chose Bhanu.

- First call-out: Summer Jacobs
- Bottom two: Aakriti Singh & Bhanu Chaudhary
- Eliminated: Bhanu Chaudhary
- Featured photographer: Dabboo Ratnani

=== Episode 3: Runway ===
Original airdate: 4 November 2017

Trainer Alesia Raut was a guest mentor to train the models for a runway challenge on a 10-inch runway in the water and had to take a selfie using OPPO phone kept at the end of the ramp. As the winner of the challenge Sabita was allowed to choose any 3 girls to give a disadvantage at the next shoot. She chose Eva, Aakriti & Summer. On set the models had a jewelry beauty shoot using balding caps while holding iguanas. The girls with disadvantage had to shoot with two iguanas instead of one like the other contestants.

- First call-out: Riya Subodh
- Bottom two: Aakriti Singh & Madhurima Rao
- Eliminated: Madhurima Rao

=== Episode 4: Makeover ===
Original airdate: 11 November 2017

A new contestant named Tanishq entered the competition. During this episode, makeovers occurred. After makeovers the contestants had a free fall photo shoot.

- First call-out: Shweta Raj
- Bottom three: Akanksha Corda & Tanishq Sharma
- Eliminated: None

=== Episode 5: Chemistry ===
Original airdate: 18 November 2017

This week the girls had a challenge photo shoot in pairs. The pairs were Aakrati & Tej, Parina & Jay, Eva & Mandeep, Shweta & Mohit, Nikhil & Riya, Sabita & Akash and Akansha & Baseer. Summer & Tanishq were left out and had to pair up with each other. Riya won immunity for this week's elimination for winning the challenge. On set the models had a photoshoot with Amante lingerie and posing on the pole.

- First call-out: Riya Subodh
- Bottom three: Sabita Karki, Summer Jacobs & Tanishq Sharma
- Eliminated: Tanishq Sharma & Summer Jacobs
- Special guests: Tej Gill, Akash Chaudhary, Nikhil Sachdeva, Mohit Hiranandani, Jay Bodas, Baseer Ali, Mandeep Gujjar

=== Episode 6: Expressions ===
Original airdate: 25 November 2017

This week the girls had a challenge photo shoot as cowgirl and Parina win the challenge. On set the models had a commercial for Livon Serum in pair.

- First call-out: Parina Chopra & Riya Subodh
- Bottom two: Aakriti Singh & Eva Aario
- Eliminated: Aakriti Singh
- Featured photographer:

=== Episode 7: Editorial & Commercial ===
Original airdate: 2 December 2017

This week the girls had a challenge photo shoot for Livon Serum and Parina win the challenge, After challenge, Neeraj ask the girl who should not remained in the competition. On set the models had a sexy photoshoot that they bodies covered in chocolate and pose with male model. Because Eva & Riya were the most voted, they had to pose together.

- First call-out: Parina Chopra
- Bottom two: Akanksha Corda & Sabita Karki
- Eliminated: Akanksha Corda
- Featured photographer:

=== Episode 8: Top 5 ===
Original airdate: 9 December 2017

The remaining 5 had an OPPO selfie challenge, Shweta won and win an OPPO Phone. Later, they had a runway challenge on a cowhouse. As the winner of the challenge, Shweta became the first finalist in the finale. On set the models had a glamorous shoot with Malaika Arora.

- Ticket to Finale: Shweta Raj (Immune from elimination)
- First call-out: Sabita Karki
- Bottom three: Eva Aario, Parina Chopra & Riya Subodh
- Eliminated: Eva Aario & Parina Chopra

=== Episode 9: Finale ===
Original Airdate: 16 December 2017

The remaining 3 had a photoshoot for OPPO calendar 2018. Later, they had the last photoshoot with family member. They had a final runway show in the judging room. At the end, Riya became India's Next Top Model.

- Final 3: Riya Subodh, Sabita Karki & Shweta Raj
- Eliminated: Shweta Raj
- Final 2: Riya Subodh & Sabita Karki
- India's Next Top Model: Riya Subodh

=== Episode 10: Recap ===
Original Airdate: 23 December 2017

This was a recap episode.

== Summaries ==
=== Call-out order ===
Order	Episodes								
Order	2		3	4 (Note: In episode 4, Tanishq entered the competition as a wildcard contestant. Akanksha, Summer and Tanishq landed in the bottom three but were all saved.)	5 (Note: In episode 5, Riya was immune from elimination for winning the challenge but also won the best performance.)	6	7	8 (Note: In episode 8, Shweta was immune from elimination for winning the challenge.)	9
1	Sabita	Summer	Riya	Shweta	Riya	Parina; Riya	Parina	Sabita	Riya
2	Shweta	Parina	Eva	Sabita	Parina	Parina; Riya	Riya	Shweta	Sabita
3	Akanksha	Riya	Summer	Aakriti	Eva	Shweta	Shweta	Riya	Shweta
4	Summer	Madhurima	Parina	Riya	Akanksha	Akanksha	Eva	Parina; Eva	
5	Eva	Shweta	Sabita	Parina	Shweta	Sabita	Sabita	Parina; Eva	
6	Riya	Eva	Akanksha	Eva	Aakriti	Eva	Akanksha		
7	Madhurima	Sabita	Shweta	Akanksha; Summer; Tanishq	Sabita	Aakriti			
8	Bhanu	Akanksha	Aakriti	Akanksha; Summer; Tanishq	Summer; Tanishq				
9	Aakriti	Aakriti	Madhurima	Akanksha; Summer; Tanishq	Summer; Tanishq				
10	Parina	Bhanu							

The contestant was eliminated
The contestant was in a non-elimination bottom three
The contestant was immune from elimination
The contestant won the competition

=== Photo shoot guide ===
- Episode 2 photo shoot: Posing underwater with Milind Soman
- Episode 3 photo shoot: Bald beauty shoot with jewelries and iguanas
- Episode 4 photo shoot: Falling from a skyscraper
- Episode 5 photo shoot: Posing with a pole in Amante lingerie
- Episode 6 commercial: Livon Serum in pair
- Episode 7 photo shoots: Livon Serum campaign on trampoline; Romance on the chocolate bathtub with male model
- Episode 8 photo shoot: Glamorous with Malaika Arora
- Episode 9 photo shoot: Final photo with family
