= Firangi =

2017 film by Rajiev Dhingra

- Theatrical release poster
- Directed by: Rajiev Dhingra
- Written by: Balwinder Singh Janjua; Rupinder Chahal
- Story by: Rajiev Dhingra
- Produced by: Kapil Sharma
- Starring: Kapil Sharma; Ishita Dutta; Monica Gill; Inaamulhaq
- Narrated by: Amitabh Bachchan
- Cinematography: Navneet Misser
- Edited by: Omkar Nath Bakhri
- Music by: Jatinder Shah
- Production company: K9 Films
- Distributed by: AA Films
- Release date: 1 December 2017
- Running time: 160 minutes
- Country: India
- Language: Hindi
- Budget: ₹25 crore
- Box office: est. ₹10–17 crore

Firangi (transl. Foreigner) is a 2017 Indian Hindi-language historical comedy film written and directed by Rajiev Dhingra. It stars Kapil Sharma, who is also the producer, along with Ishita Dutta and Monica Gill. The film was shot primarily in Punjab and Rajasthan and had a worldwide release on 1 December 2017. The film received mixed reviews from the critics and became a commercial failure.

== Plot ==
In the 1920s, Mangatram "Manga" is an uneducated, jobless young man who dreams of joining the Police Force but fails at every attempt made to do so. During a visit to the village Naku Guda for his friend Heera's wedding, Manga comes across Sargi and falls in love with her, but being jobless Manga is unable to move forward with his relationship with Sargi.

Manga was born with a unique ability that he could cure anyone's back-ache with a simple kick to the buttocks. One day he manages to cure Englishman Mark Daniel of his back-ache using the same technique. Impressed, Mark offers him a job in the Police Force, which Manga happily accepts. Manga is convinced that since he has a job now, Sargi's family won't object to his marriage with her and so he approaches Sargi's grandfather Lalaji. But Lalaji, who is a follower of Mahatma Gandhi, refuses the proposal because Manga is working for the British, the very people against whom the people of the Naku Guda are fighting for their freedom.

== Cast ==
- Kapil Sharma as Mangatram "Manga"
- Ishita Dutta as Sargi
- Monica Gill as Princess Shyamali Devi
- Edward Sonnenblick as Mark Daniels
- Kumud Mishra as Raja Inderveer Singh
- Inaamulhaq as Heera
- Neeta Mohindra as Maharani/Mother of Shyamali Devi
- Rajesh Sharma
- Aanjjan Srivastav as Lala Ji
- Jatinder Kaur as Grandmother of Manga
- Jameel Khan
- Vishal O Sharma as Pehelwan
- Maryam Zakaria as item number "Gulbadan"
- Roshni Walia as Nimmo
- Hagupreet Singh
- Ghulam Hussain

== Production ==
According to the film director Rajiev Dhingra and producer Kapil Sharma, the idea behind making Firangi was to tell a story set in pre-partition era without making the freedom movement of India, which was prevalent at that time, as its focal point. Kapil said that most films set in pre-independence era have been about the freedom struggle and the tragedies that took place at that time, so they decided to make a story which would focus on the day-to-day lives of people and the simple moments of happiness that they shared with each other.

"We had an observation: all the movies that were made during the partition era invariably showed the dark and the tragic side. My grandfather, who was from Pakistan, used to share sad stories about displacement, but he also regaled us of a time when people used to celebrate Eid and Diwali together. Those happy tales spurred the idea for Firangi. So we thought, why not make a film that showed the normal life and the love that blossomed between a couple in the pre-partition era?

— Kapil Sharma on the thought process that conceived the movie Firangi.

== Release ==
Initially, the film was set to release on 10 November 2017, however on 12 October 2017 it was announced that the film would be releasing on 24 November 2017. On 21 November, the release date was again postponed due to the delay in obtaining a censor certificate from the Central Board of Film Certification. After obtaining a U/A certificate from the CBFC, Firangi was released on 1 December 2017.

== Soundtrack ==
Firangi

Soundtrack album by Jatinder Shah
- Released: 21 November 2017
- Recorded: 2017
- Genre: Feature film soundtrack
- Length: 23:22
- Language: Hindi
- Label: Zee Music Company

Jatinder Shah chronology
Bailaras (2017)	Firangi (2017)	Sat Shri Akaal England (2017)

Singles from Firangi
- 1. "Oye Firangi" Released: 27 October 2017; 2. "Sajna Sohne Jiha" Released: 2 November 2017; 3. "Sahiba Russ Gayiya" Released: 9 November 2017

The soundtrack of Firangi is composed by Jatinder Shah while the lyrics have been penned by Dr. Devendra Kafir except one song Gulbadan, lyrics by Ashraf Ali and Krishna Bhardwaj. The first song of the film "Oye Firangi" sung by Sunidhi Chauhan was released on 27 October 2017. The second track of the film titled as "Sajna Sohne Jiha" sung by Jyoti Nooran was released on 2 November 2017. The third single to be released was "Sahiba Russ Gayiya" which is sung by Rahat Fateh Ali Khan was released on 9 November 2017. The music of the film was officially released by Zee Music Company on 21 November 2017 which includes 6 songs.

Track listing
No.	Title	Singer(s)	Length
1.	"Oye Firangi"	Sunidhi Chauhan	3:19
2.	"Sajna Sohne Jiha"	Jyoti Nooran	3:34
3.	"Sahiba Russ Gayiya"	Rahat Fateh Ali Khan	4:20
4.	"Tu Jit Jawna"	Daler Mehndi	3:48
5.	"Gulbadan"	Mamta Sharma Devender Pal Singh	4:00
6.	"Sahiba" (Male Unplugged)	Shafqat Amanat Ali	4:22
Total length:			23:22

== Reception ==
=== Critical response ===
As of June 2020, Firangi holds a 14% approval rating on review aggregator website Rotten Tomatoes, based on seven reviews with an average rating of 3.67 out of 10. Subhash K. Jha gave the film a rating of 4 stars out of 5, and called it "Deliriously Enjoyable Even For Non-Kapil Fans!". He further stated that "Those who think Kapil's days are numbered should make it a point to see what unrehearsed energy he brings to even the most mundane conversation about a bar of soap." Rajeev Masand of News18 gave the film a rating of 1.5 stars out of 5 and said that, "Firangi is a bloated two-hour forty minute exercise designed to suggest that Kapil Sharma can act but to survive the film you need to be chained to your seat with toothpicks holding up your eyelids". Shristi Negi of News 18 gave the film a rating of 1.5 stars out of 5 and said that, "The random execution of the movie fails to add anything of interest to the plot. Even with great supporting cast like Aanjjan Srivastav and Rajesh Sharma, the film feels frustratingly disjointed.". Sweta Kausal of Hindustan Times gave the film a rating of 1 star out of 5 and said that, "the boring narrative, an incoherent screenplay and mismatch between milieu and discourse in certain scenes of the film make it an extremely mind-numbing affair". Saibal Chatterjee of NDTV gave the film a rating of 2 stars out of 5 and criticised the film for its excessive length and inconsistent screenplay and said that, "Neither the comic potential at the core of the film nor the energy of Kapil Sharma's antics is enough to pull it out of the irremediable mess it degenerates into.".

Renuka Vyavahare of The Times of India gave the film a rating of 2 stars out of 5 saying that, "Firangi moves at a snail's pace leading us to a semi-fun climax. Sadly, the film doesn't even fall into 'so bad, it's good' category. It is outright boring and thus not even perversely entertaining". Shubhra Gupta of The Indian Express gave the film a rating of 2 stars out of 5 and said that, "The trouble with this mildly engaging film, with a solid supporting cast, is that it is far too long.". Bollywood Hungama gave the film a rating of 2 stars out of 5 saying that, "On the whole, due to its weak script and lack of comedy Firangi fails to leave a lasting impression. Besides this, the long run time of 161 mins will leave the audiences impatient and restless.".

Nandini Ramnath of Scroll criticised the movie saying that, "At 160 minutes, Rajiev Dhingra's movie is highly overstretched, and squanders its comic potential despite having a comedian as its hero." Aman Khurana of Times Now gave the film a rating of 2 stars out of 5 and said that, "Packed with unappealing performances and a done-to-death storyline, Firangi is a below average affair."

== Accolades ==
Award Ceremony	Category	Recipient	Result	Ref.(s)
10th Mirchi Music Awards	Raag-Inspired Song of the Year	"Sajna Sohne Jiha"	Nominated	
