= The Unknown World =

- Film poster
- Directed by: Varun Mehta
- Written by: Varun Mehta
- Produced by: Wiz Motion Studio
- Release date: 2011
- Country: India
- Language: English

The Unknown World is a 2011 animated film from India about female infanticide or female foeticide, directed and produced by Varun Mehta. The film won an online film and animation contest in 2012. It was also screened at the Public Service Announcement Film Festival in Chennai, India in 2011.

== Plot ==
A young woman is about to give birth to a girl. In her mother's womb, the child sets her own world where she plays, dances, swings and jumps around happily. It's a world that is unknown to the real world. The child is awaiting happily for her arrival in the real world, but when her parents decide to abort the child is killed inside the womb. The child can only see her world being destroyed in front of her eyes.

== Reception ==
The Unknown World was first screened at the first Public Service Announcement (PSA) Film Festival at Chennai. It received a special prize for its theme of 'Female Foeticide'. In 2012 it won an international short film contest organized by American website Buzzgoo.com.

The film was screened in many cities throughout India. The Society of Animation In Delhi (SAID) honored the film in an award function in 2012. It was also honored by the government of Aligarh in a function organized by Manav Upkar, a social organization.
