= Sagat Singh =

Indian Army officer (1919–2001)

Lieutenant General Sagat Singh PVSM
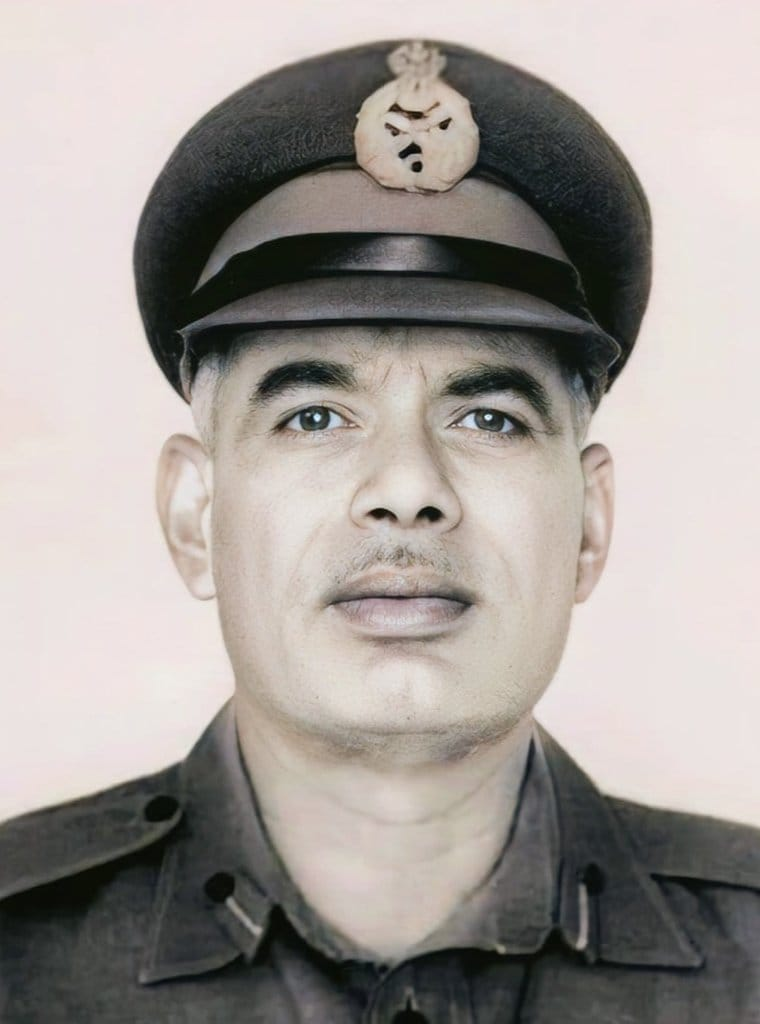
- Lt Gen Sagat Singh
- Born: 14 July 1919; Kusumdesar, Bikaner state, Rajputana (present day: Kusumdesar, Churu, Rajasthan)
- Died: 26 September 2001 (aged 82); New Delhi, India
- Military career
- Allegiance: British India; India
- Branch: British Indian Army; Indian Army
- Rank: Lieutenant General
- Unit: 3rd Gorkha Rifles
- Commands: IV Corps; 17th Mountain Division; 50th Parachute Brigade; 2/3 GR; 3/3 GR
- Conflicts: World War II; Annexation of Goa; Nathu La and Cho La clashes; Indo-Pakistani war of 1971; Operation Cactus Lilly
- Awards: Padma Bhushan; Param Vishisht Seva Medal

Lieutenant General Sagat Singh, PVSM (14 July 1919 – 26 September 2001) was a General Officer in the Indian Army, notable for his participation in the annexation of Goa, his crucial role in Nathu La and Cho La clashes, where Indian troops held their positions at Nathu La and pushed back Chinese forces, and later for his operational maneuver in crossing Meghna river and capturing Dhaka during Indo-Pakistani war of 1971. He held many commands and staff appointments throughout his career. He is regarded as one of the best Indian field Commanders to carry out operational maneuvers during any war.

== Early life and education ==
Singh was born in a Rajput family in the village of Kusumdesar in Churu region of Bikaner State on 14 July 1919 to Brijlal Singh Rathore of Kusumdesar and a Bhati lady, Jadao Kanwar of Hadla. Brijlal was a soldier in the Bikaner Ganga Risala who served in Mesopotamia, Palestine and France during World War I. He was recalled to service at the outbreak of World War II and retired as an Honorary Captain. Sagat was the oldest of three brothers and six sisters, he completed his schooling from Walter Nobles High School at Bikaner in 1936.

== Bikaner Ganga Risala ==
Singh joined Dungar College at Bikaner but right after his intermediate exam in 1938, he was enrolled as a Naik in the Bikaner Ganga Risala, also known as the Bikaner Camel Corps. Later, he was promoted to Jemadar (now called Naib Subedar) and given command of a platoon.

=== World War II ===
With the outbreak of World War II, he was among the few Viceroy's Commissioned Officers who received a commission as Second Lieutenants in the Ganga Risala. The Risala was sent to Sind in 1941 to deal with the Hoor rebellion. Here, the Sadul Light Infantry replaced the Ganga Risala and Singh was transferred to the new unit. In 1941, the unit landed at Basra and came under the Iraqforce commanded by Lieutenant General Edward Quinan.

Singh, with the Sadul Light Infantry, then moved Jubair in Iraq. He was appointed the unit's Military Transport Officer after having obtained an instructor grading in the Military Transport Course. He later served as adjutant and then took command of a company. After a staff stint at the sub area headquarters, he was selected to attend the Middle East Staff College at Haifa. He was the only State Forces officer to be selected. After completing the staff course, he was appointed General Staff Officer Grade 3 (GSO III) at Headquarters 40th Indian Infantry Brigade in Ahvaz, Iran.

In September 1944, Singh rejoined his battalion and was appointed adjutant. He was selected to attend the Staff College, Quetta and joined the 12th War Staff course from May to November 1945. After completing the course, he was recalled to Bikaner and appointed brigade major of the state forces, working directly under the commander-in-chief. After the war, when it became apparent that India would be an independent nation, he was responsible for the absorption of the state forces into the Indian Army.

== Indian Army ==
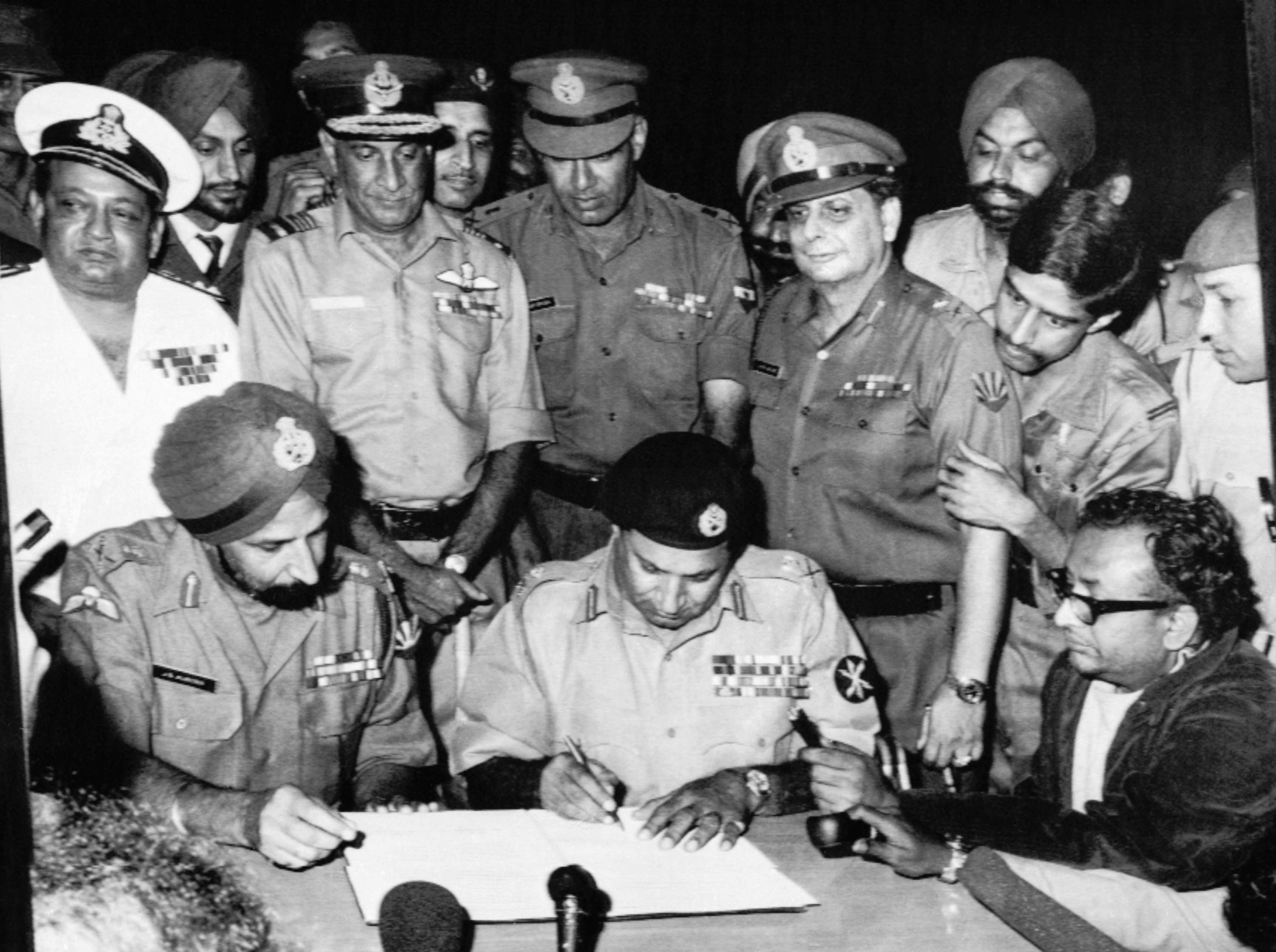
Lt Gen A A K Niazi signing the Pakistani Instrument of Surrender under the gaze of Lt Gen J S Aurora. Standing immediately behind (L-R) VAdm Nilakanta Krishnan, Air Mshl Hari Chand Dewan, Lt Gen Sagat Singh and Maj Gen J. F. R. Jacob.

In 1949, Singh was transferred to the Indian Army and joined the 3rd Queen Alexandra's Own Gurkha Rifles. He was appointed General Staff Officer Grade 2 (GSO II) at Headquarters Delhi Area. His seniority in the state forces was restored and in October 1950, he was appointed brigade major (BM) of the 168 Infantry Brigade in Samba. During this stint, he attended the Mountain Warfare course and was shortlisted for command of the President's Bodyguard. After three years as BM, he was posted to the 3rd Battalion of the 3rd Gorkha Rifles as a company commander in October 1953. He served in the battalion for a year and-a-half in Bharatpur and in Dharamshala.

In February 1955, Singh was promoted to the rank of lieutenant colonel and appointed commanding officer of the second battalion 3rd Gorkha Rifles (2/3 GR) at Ferozepur. He moved the battalion to its field area in Jammu and Kashmir in October 1955 and relinquished command in December to attend the senior officers course. After completing the course, where he obtained an instructor grading, he took command of 3/3 GR at Dharamshala. In August 1957, he moved the battalion to Poonch and in November that year, he was posted as a senior instructor at the Infantry School Mhow.

After a 2 1/2-year stint, in May 1960, he was promoted to the rank of colonel and posted to Army HQ as deputy director personnel services in the Adjutant-General's branch. Here, his good work brought him to the notice of the Adjutant-General Lieutenant General P P Kumaramangalam. In September 1961, Singh was promoted to the rank of brigadier and given command of India's only parachute brigade, the elite 50th Parachute Brigade at Agra. This was unprecedented as command of the brigade is not given to non-para officers. At the age of 42, he immediately earned his maroon beret and his Parachutist badge by making the required number of jumps.

=== Liberation of Goa ===
In late November 1961, Singh was summoned to the Military Operations directorate at Army HQ for the planning of the liberation of Goa. The force consisted of 17th Infantry Division, led by Major General Kunhiraman Palat Candeth, which was to move into Goa from the East and 50 Parachute Brigade which was tasked to execute a subsidiary thrust from the North. Gen Candeth was in overall command of the force. The para brigade had two battalions (1 Para and 2 Para) and it was planned that one battalion would be para-dropped. 2 Para was moved to Begumpet Air Force Station for this purpose. The brigade moved from Agra on 2 December and reached Belgaum by 6 December where Singh established the brigade HQ. Since the brigade has only 2 battalions 2nd battalion Sikh Light Infantry (2 Sikh LI) which was in Madras was also allotted. The brigade received armoured elements as well - the 7th Light Cavalry with its Stuart tanks and a squadron of 8th Light Cavalry which had AMX-13 tanks.

Hostilities at Goa began at 09:45 on 17 December 1961, when a unit of Indian troops attacked and occupied the town of Maulinguém in the north east, killing two Portuguese soldiers. On the morning of 18 December, Singh moved the brigade into Goa in three columns:

1. The eastern column comprised the 2 Para advanced towards the town of Ponda in central Goa via Usgão.
2. The central column consisting of the 1 Para advanced towards Panaji via the village of Banastari.
3. The western column—the main thrust of the attack—comprised the 2 Sikh LI as well as an armoured division which crossed the border at 06:30 and advanced on Tivim.

Although the 50th Para Brigade was charged with merely assisting the main thrust conducted by the 17th Infantry Division, its units moved rapidly across minefields, roadblocks and four riverine obstacles to be the first to reach the capital of Goa, Panjim on 19 December 1961. The brigade achieved objectives much beyond its initial purview. On entering the capital, Singh ordered his troops to remove their steel helmets and wear the Parachute Regiment’s maroon berets.

The brigade was in Goa till June 1962. After moving back to Agra, Singh led the brigade for another year-and-a-half, until January 1964. He was selected to attend the prestigious National Defence College (NDC). He joined the 4th NDC course and graduated in January 1965. He was then appointed Brigadier General Staff (BGS) at HQ XI Corps at Jalandhar.

=== General Officer ===
After a short stint as BGS, in July 1965, Singh was promoted to the rank of major general and appointed general officer commanding (GOC) 17 Mountain Division, the division which had participated in the Goa operations. The division had since moved to Sikkim and was on the Indo-China border. During this stint, the Nathu La and Cho La clashes took place, where 17 Mountain Division achieved "decisive tactical advantage" and defeated the Chinese forces in these clashes.

In December 1967, Singh was appointed GOC 101 Communication Zone in Shillong. The formation was involved in operations in the Mizo Hills. He immediately set out to build the formation's capabilities in intelligence gathering and counter-insurgency. During this stint, on 26 January 1970, Singh was awarded the Param Vishisht Seva Medal for distinguished service of the most exceptional order.

After a stint of three years as GOC 101 Communication zone, Singh was promoted to the rank of lieutenant general and took over the command of IV Corps in December 1970

=== Nathu La and Cho La Clashes ===
During the 1967 Nathu La and Cho La clashes, as Commander of 17 Mountain Division, Sagat Singh played a decisive role in retaining Nathu La. When pressure was put on India to vacate the pass, he refused, maintaining that Nathu La lay on the watershed and was the natural boundary. Under his leadership, Indian troops held their positions during the Chinese attack in September 1967 and forced the attacking Chinese forces back, retaining control of Nathu La. The events at Nathu La and Cho La were later depicted in the 2018 Hindi film Paltan, in which Jackie Shroff portrayed Sagat Singh.

=== Indo-Pakistani War of 1971 ===
During the Bangladesh Liberation War in 1971, the corps made the famous advance to Dhaka over the River Meghna. Lt Gen Sagat Singh also conceptualised the Indian Army's first heliborne operation in the Battle of Sylhet He witnessed in Dhaka the signing of the surrender instrument by General Niazi.

For his leadership and command for the race to Dhaka, the Government of India honored Lt. Gen. Sagat Singh with the third highest civilian award of Padma Bhushan. Lt. Gen. Sagat Singh is the only other Corps commander besides Lt. Gen. (later Gen. and COAS) T N Raina and Lt. Gen. Sartaj Singh to be so awarded in 1971.

Lt. Gen. Sagat Singh died at the Army Hospital Research and Referral, New Delhi on 26 September 2001.

== Military Awards ==
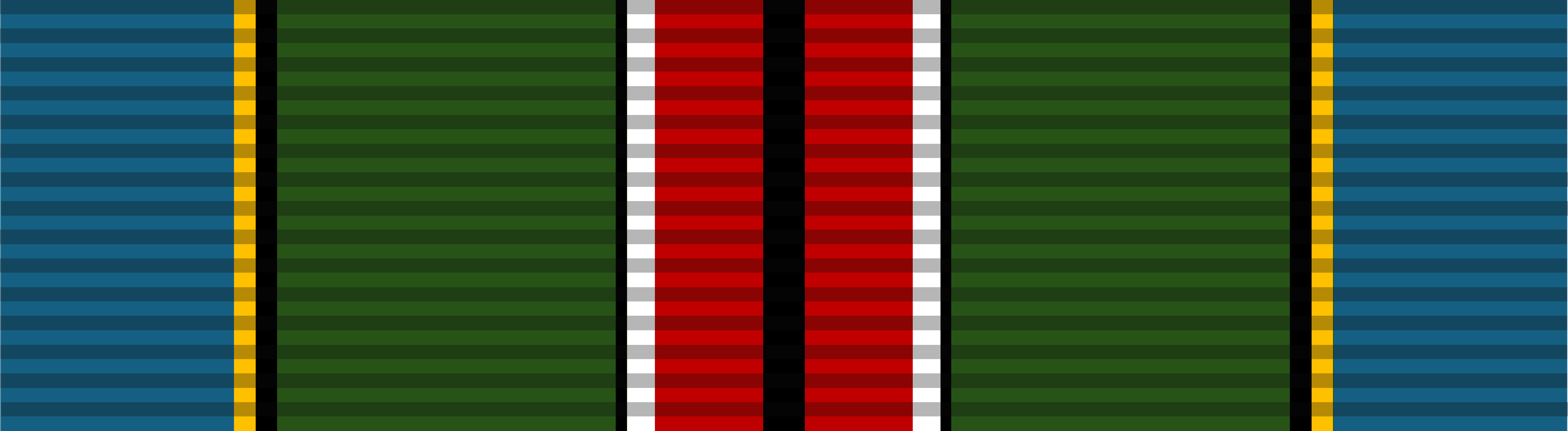

Padma Bhushan	Param Vishisht Seva Medal	Wound Medal (India)	General Service Medal (India) (Goa 1961)
Poorvi Star	Raksha Medal	Sangram Medal	Sainya Seva Medal (Himalaya) (Mizo Hills) (Jammu & Kashmir)
Indian Independence Medal	25th Independence Anniversary Medal	20 Years Long Service Medal	9 Years Long Service Medal
Sadul Singh Accession Medal 1943 (Bikaner)	Defence Medal (United Kingdom)	War Medal 1939–1945	Sena Ram Shastri Medal (Dewas Senior Princely State)

== Personal life ==
Singh married Kamla Kumari on 27 January 1947; Kamla was daughter of the Chief Justice of Jammu and Kashmir, Rachpal Singh. They had four sons, two of whom joined the army. Their eldest son, Ranvijay, was born in February 1949. He was commissioned into the 1st battalion, The Garhwal Rifles (1 GARH RIF), which was later mechanised and re-designated as 6th battalion the Mechanised Infantry Regiment (6 MECH). He retired in the rank of colonel. The second son, Digvijay, was born in October 1950 and was commissioned into the 2nd battalion the 3rd Gorkha Rifles (2/3 GR), the battalion his father had commanded. He died while serving with the battalion in Poonch as a captain on 4 March 1976, in an accident while traveling in a jeep. Their third son, Vir Vijay was born in August 1954. An ill-fated scooter accident in Delhi claimed his life just eight months before that of his elder brother. The loss of two sons in the prime of their lives within a short span of eight months was a terrible loss to Sagat and his wife. Their youngest son Chandra Vijay was born in April 1956. He became a business executive.

== In popular culture ==
Sagat Singh's character was played by Jackie Shroff in the 2018 Indian Hindi-language film Paltan.

A comic book about Singh was released by Aan Comics in 2021, on the 50th anniversary of the Indo-Pakistani war of 1971.

== See also ==
- Annexation of Goa
- Indo-Pakistani war of 1971
- Meghna Heli Bridge
- Pakistani Instrument of Surrender
