= Monica Gill =

American model, actress and beauty pageant title holder

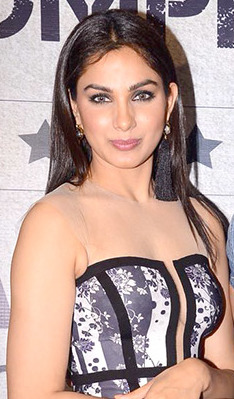
- Monica Gill at completion bash of Paltan
- Born: 1988 or 1989 (age 36–37)
- Education: University of Massachusetts Amherst
- Title: Miss India USA 2013; Miss India Worldwide 2014
- Term: June 2014 – November 2015
- Partner: Gurshawn Sahota (e. 2018 -2021)

Monica Gill is an American model, actress and beauty pageant titleholder. She won Miss India USA in 2013 and won Miss India Worldwide in 2014. In 2015, she participated in the MTV India show India's Next Top Model.

== Career ==
Gill was working in pharmaceuticals trying to figure out if she wanted to pursue her medical career. After winning Miss India Worldwide USA, Gill decided to pursue Bollywood in India. Her pageant win opened up doors in the Indian film industry including a meeting with Tips Industries that lead to a three-film deal. Gill was originally hoping to land roles in Bollywood but her Hindi-speaking skills were an issue. As a fluent Punjabi speaker, she decided to pursue Punjabi films instead. Gill landed a talent agent in Mumbai and went to acting school before making her film debut.

Gill made her Punjabi film debut in the 2016 film Ambarsariya opposite Diljit Dosanjh. That year, she went on to star in three back to back blockbuster Punjabi films. The following year, she made her Hindi film debut in the 2017 film Firangi. In 2018, she was seen in the Hindi film Paltan, where she played the love interest of, Harshvardhan Rane. In 2019, she acted in Punjabi-language period drama Yaara Ve.

== Personal life ==
Gill met Gurshawn Sahota, a California-based dentist, at her cousin's wedding. The couple had long-distance relationship and were engaged in 2018. Gill moved back home with her parents to plan her wedding but delayed their wedding due to the COVID-19 pandemic. Gill and Sahota separated in Nov 2021.

Gill supported the 2020–2021 Indian farmers' protest.

== Filmography ==
Year	Film	Role	Language	Notes	Reference
2016	Ambarsariya	Kirat	Punjabi	Punjabi debut	
2016	Kaptaan	Preeti	Punjabi		
2016	Sardaarji 2	Soni	Punjabi		
2017	Firangi	Shyamali	Hindi	Hindi debut	
2017	Sat Shri Akaal England	Geet	Punjabi		
2018	Paltan	Harjot Kaur	Hindi		
2019	Yaara Ve	Naseebo	Punjabi		
2024	Ucha Dar Babe Nanak Da		Punjabi		
