= Top Model India =

Indian TV series

- Genre: Reality television; Competition
- Created by: Tyra Banks
- Presented by: Lisa Haydon
- Judges: Lisa Haydon; Anaita Shroff Adajania; Atul Kasbekar
- Country of origin: India
- Original language: English
- No. of seasons: 1
- No. of episodes: 10

Production
- Production company: Bulldog Media / Endemol Shine India

Original release
- Network: Colors Infinity
- Release: 4 February – 8 April 2018

Top Model India is an Indian English-language reality television series, which premiered on 4 February 2018 and broadcast on Colors Infinity. The series is an Indian version of Tyra Banks-created 2003 American reality television series America's Next Top Model. The viewers see several men and women compete for the title of Top Model India, providing them with an opportunity to begin their career in the modeling industry.

This is the reboot of MTV India's India's Next Top Model.

Mahir Pandhi is the winner of the first cycle of the show.

== Judges & Mentors ==
Judge	Cycle
Judge	1
Lisa Haydon	Host/Judge
Anaita Shroff Adajania	Judge
Atul Kasbekar	Judge
Shibani Dandekar	Mentor

== Cycles ==
Cycle	Premiere date	Winner	Runner-up	Other contestants in order of elimination	Number of contestants
1	4 February 2018	Mahir Pandhi	Shehzad Deol	Nupura Bhaskar, Lemuel Huffman, Marina Lang, Pearl Almeida, Ram Ramasamy & Sidharth Neeraj Sharma, Gurin Bal, Joshua Chhabra & Rishitha Koruturu, Satabdi Dutta Banik, Aishwarya Suresh	13

== See also ==
- India's Next Top Model
- MTV Supermodel of the Year
