= Born Stylish =

- Genre: Reality show
- Country of origin: India

Original release
- Network: VH1 India; Colors Infinity
- Release: 28 November 2015

Born Stylish is an Indian television show hosted by fashion designer and stylist Pria Kataaria Puri. It premiered on 28 November 2015 as a joint series of Colors Infinity and VH1 India. The show featured celebrity guests including Akshay Kumar, Sonakshi Sinha, Anil Kapoor, Malaika Arora Khan, Fawad Khan, Lisa Haydon, Nimrat Kaur and the finale featured Ajay Devgn.

== Episodes ==
Season 1	Celebrity guest	Style Theme
Season Premiere	Akshay Kumar	Alphamale
Episode 2	Malaika Arora Khan	Sultry Siren
Episode 3	Anil Kapoor	Polished Panache
Episode 4	Sonakshi Sinha	Edgy Exotic
Episode 5	Fawad Khan	Dapper Debonair
Episode 6	Lisa Haydon	Boho Chic
Episode 7	Nimrat Kaur	Classic Minimalist
Season Finale	Ajay Devgn	Suave Unconventional
