= Nathu La and Cho La clashes =

Border clashes between China and India in 1967

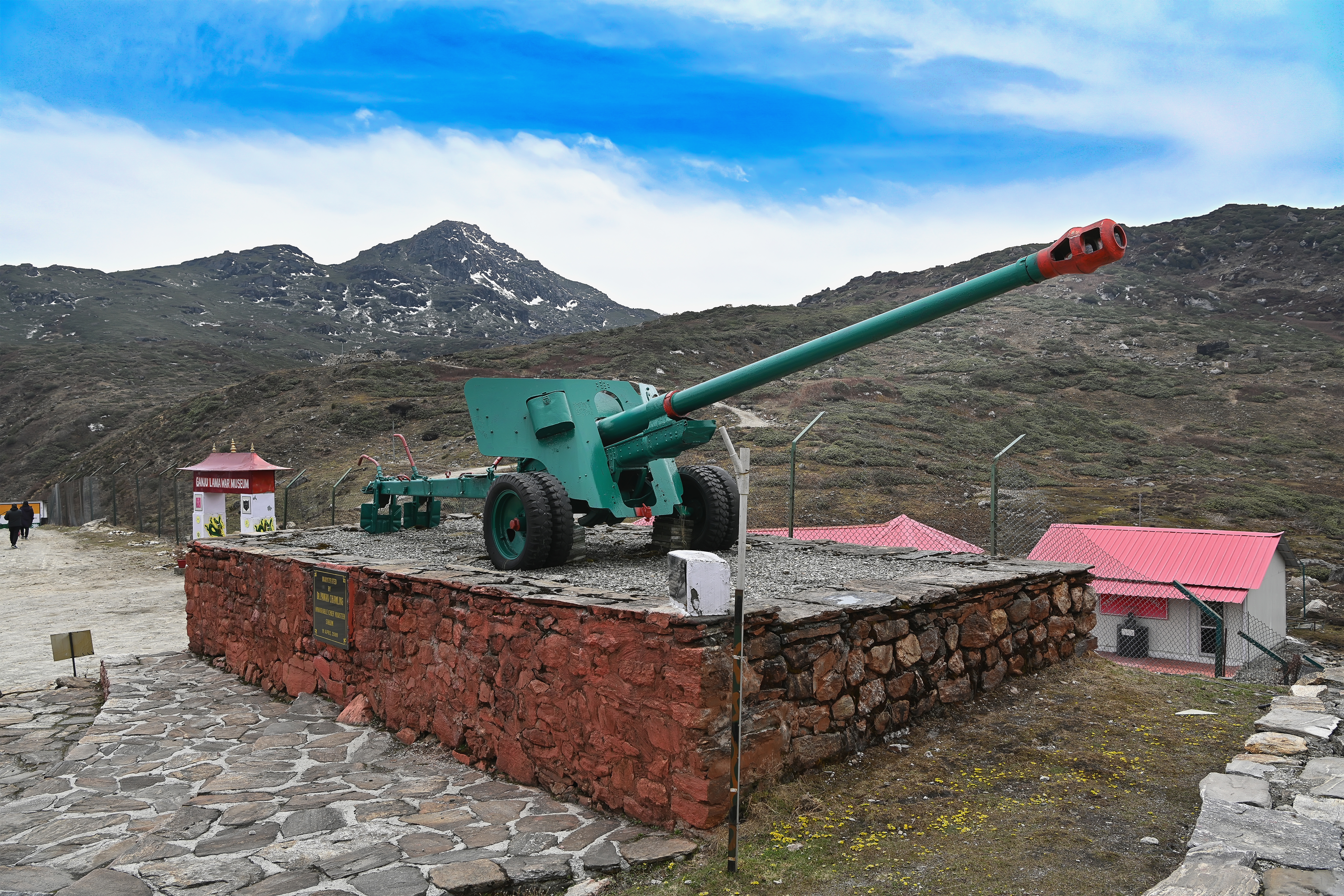
- Indian 100 mm gun used in the following border skirmishes.
Date	11–14 September 1967 (Nathu La) (3 days); 1 October 1967 (Cho La)
Location	Nathu La and Cho La, on the border between China and the Kingdom of Sikkim
Result	Indian victory
Territorial changes	Chinese initiative retreat from Nathu La and Cho La; Incorporation of Kingdom of Sikkim into the Republic of India

Belligerents
India Sikkim	China

Commanders and leaders
Zakir Husain (President); Indira Gandhi (Prime Minister); Gen. P. P. Kumaramangalam (Chief of the Army Staff); Lt. Gen. Jagjit Singh Aurora; Maj. Gen. Sagat Singh; Brig. Rai Singh Yadav (2 Grenadiers)	Mao Zedong (Chairman of the CPC/CMC); Zhou Enlai (Chinese Premier); Maj. Gen. Wang Chenghan (Deputy commander of the Tibet Military District); Maj. Gen. Yu Zhiquan

Units involved
Indian Army	People's Liberation Army Ground Force

Strength
Part of the 112th Infantry Brigade	31st Infantry Regiment: 4th Rifle Company; 6th Rifle Company; 2nd Machine Company; 2nd Artillery Company; 75th Artillery Battalion 308th Artillery Brigade: 3rd Artillery Regiment

Casualties and losses
Indian claims: 88 killed 163 wounded Chinese claims: 101 killed (65 Nathu La, 36 Cho La)	Indian claims: 340 killed 450 wounded Chinese claims: 32 killed (Nathu La), unknown (Cho La)

The Nathu La and Cho La clashes, sometimes referred to as Indo-China War of 1967, Sino-Indian War of 1967, were a series of clashes between China and India alongside the border of the Himalayan Kingdom of Sikkim, then an Indian protectorate.

The Nathu La clashes started on 11 September 1967, when China's People's Liberation Army (PLA) launched an attack on Indian posts at Nathu La, and lasted till 15 September 1967. In October 1967, another military duel took place at Cho La and ended on the same day.

According to independent sources, India achieved "decisive tactical advantage" and managed to hold its own against and push back Chinese forces. Many PLA fortifications at Nathu La were destroyed, where the Indian troops drove back the attacking Chinese forces. The competition to control the disputed borderland in Chumbi Valley is seen as a major cause for heightening the tensions in these incidents. Observers have commented that these clashes indicated the decline of 'claim strength' in China's decision to initiate the use of force against India, and stated that India was greatly pleased with the combat performance of its forces in the Nathu La clashes, seeing it as a sign of striking improvement since its defeat in the 1962 Sino-Indian War.

== Background ==
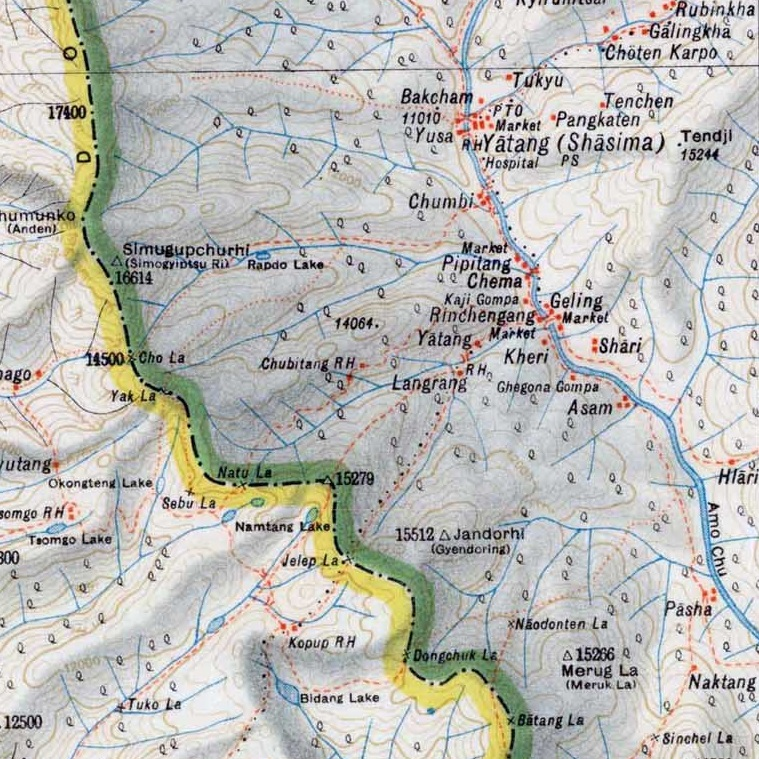
Cho La and Nathu La passes marked on a Survey of India map of 1923

Following the 1962 Sino-Indian War, tensions continued to run high along the Himalayan border shared by India and China. Influenced by its previous defeat, the Indian Army raised a number of new units, nearly doubling their deployed forces along the disputed region. As a part of this military expansion, seven mountain divisions were raised to defend India's northern borders against any Chinese attack. Most of these divisions were not based near the border, save for the Chumbi Valley, where both Indian and Chinese troops were stationed on both sides at close range. Particularly at the Nathu La pass in the valley, alongside the Sikkim-Tibet border, the deployed Chinese and Indian forces are stationed about 20–30 meters apart, which is the closest of anywhere on the 4000 km Sino-Indian border. The border here is said to have remained "un-demarcated". The Chinese held the northern shoulder of the pass, while the Indian Army held the southern shoulder. Additionally, major parts of the pass, south and north of Nathu La, namely Sebu La and Camel’s back, were held by the Indians. From 1963, small-scale clashes in the region were frequently reported in the press. On 16 September 1965, during the Indo-Pakistani War of 1965, China issued an ultimatum to India to vacate the Nathu La pass. However, GOC 17 mountain division's Major General, Sagat Singh, refused to do so, arguing that Nathu La was on the watershed which comprised the natural boundary.

== Prelude ==
Starting from 13 August 1967, Chinese troops started digging trenches in Nathu La on the Sikkimese side. Indian troops observed that some of the trenches were "clearly" to the Sikkemese side of the border, and pointed it out to the local Chinese commander Zhang Guohua, who was asked to withdraw from there. Yet, in one instance, the Chinese filled the trenches again and left after adding 8 more loudspeakers to the existing 21. Indian troops decided to stretch a barbed wire along the ridges of Nathu La in order to indicate the boundary.

Accordingly, from 18 August, wires were stretched along the border, which was resented by the Chinese troops. After two days, armed with weaponry, Chinese troops took positions against the Indian soldiers who were engaged in laying the wire but made no firing.

Again on 7 September, when the Indian troops started stretching another barbed wire along the southern side of Nathu La, the local Chinese commanders along with the troops rushed to the spot and issued a "serious warning" to an Indian Lt. Col. Rai Singh Yadav to stop the work, after which a scuffle took place in which some soldiers from both sides were injured. Chinese troops were agitated by the injuries to their two soldiers.

In order to settle the situation, the Indian military hierarchy decided to lay another wire in the centre of the pass from Nathu La to Sebu La to indicate their perceived border, on 11 September 1967.

== Clashes at Nathu La ==
Accordingly, in the morning of 11 September 1967, the engineers and jawans (soldiers) of Indian Army started laying the stretch of fencing from Nathu La to Sebu La along the perceived border. According to an Indian account, immediately a Chinese Political Commissar Ren Rong, with a section of Infantry, came to the centre of the pass where the Indian Lt. Col. Rai Singh Yadav was standing with his commando platoon. Rong asked Yadav to stop laying the wire. Indian soldiers refused to halt, saying they were given orders. An argument started which soon turned into a scuffle. After that, the Chinese went back to their bunkers and the Indians resumed laying the wire.

Within a few minutes of this, a whistle was blown from the Chinese side followed by medium machine gun firing against Indian troops from north shoulder. Due to the lack of cover in the pass, the Indian troops initially suffered heavy casualties. Shortly thereafter, the Chinese also opened artillery against the Indians. A little later, Indian troops opened artillery from their side. The clashes lasted through the day and night, for the next three days, with use of artillery, mortars and machine guns, during which the Indian troops "beat back" the Chinese forces. Five days after the clashes had started, an "uneasy" ceasefire was arranged. Due to the advantageous position Indian troops had because of their occupation of high grounds at the pass in Sebu La and Camel's back, they were able to destroy many Chinese bunkers at Nathu La.

The corpses of fallen soldiers were exchanged on 15 and 16 September.

The Indian and Western perspectives attributed the initiation of these clashes to the Chinese side. The Chinese, however, blamed the Indian troops for provoking the clashes, alleging that the firing had started from the Indian side.

== Clashes at Cho La ==
On 1 October 1967, another clash between India and China took place at Cho La, a border pass a few kilometers north of Nathu La.

Scholar van Eekelen states that the duel was initiated by the Chinese troops after a scuffle between the two, when the Chinese troops infiltrated into the Sikkim-side of the border, claimed the pass and questioned the Indian occupation of it.

China, however, asserted that the provocation had come from the Indian side. According to the Chinese version, Indian troops had infiltrated into the Chinese territory across the pass, made provocations against the troops stationed there, and opened fire on them.

The military duel lasted one day, during which the Chinese were driven away, and it boosted Indian morale. According to Indian Maj. Gen. Sheru Thapliyal, the Chinese were forced to withdraw nearly three kilometers in Cho La during the clash.

== Casualties ==
The Defence Ministry of India reported: 88 killed and 163 wounded on the Indian side, while 340 killed and 450 wounded on the Chinese side, during the two incidents.

According to Chinese claims, the number of soldiers killed was 32 on the Chinese side and 65 on the Indian side in Nathu La incident; and 36 Indian soldiers and an 'unknown' number of Chinese were killed in the Cho La incident.

== Analysis ==
According to scholar Taylor Fravel, the competition to control the disputed land in Chumbi valley had played a key role in escalating tensions in these events. Fravel has argued that these incidents demonstrate the effects of China's "regime insecurity" on the use of force. He states that three factors in these clashes emphasized the role of "declining claim strength in China's decision to initiate the use of force" against India. The first was the Indian Army's expansion in size after the 1962 war, leading to the strengthening of its borders with China. The second was the apparent Indian aggression in asserting its claims near the border. The third was the Chinese perceptions of Indian actions, for which Fravel says that the most unstable period of Cultural Revolution in China, which coincided with these incidents, was a possible contributing factor. Fravel remarks that the Chinese leaders possibly magnified the potential threat from India due to the border tensions and the perceived pressure from India to strengthen its claims across the border, and decided that a severe attack was needed.

Fravel has stated that the initial Chinese attack was perhaps not authorized by the Central Military Commission (China). He also noted that after the attack was launched at Nathu La by the Chinese, the then Chinese Premier, Zhou Enlai, instructed Chinese forces to return fire only when fired upon.

Scholar John Garver states that, due to the Nathu La incident, Indian concerns were roused about China's intentions regarding Sikkim. Garver also remarks that India was "quite pleased with the combat performance of its forces in the Nathu La clashes, seeing it as signalling dramatic improvement since 1962 war."

== Aftermath ==
The Sino-Indian border remained peaceful after these incidents till 2020 China–India skirmishes.

Sikkim became an Indian state in 1975, after a referendum which resulted in overwhelming support for the removal of monarchy and a full merger with India. The Indian annexation of Sikkim was not recognised by China during the time. In 2003, China indirectly recognised Sikkim as an Indian state, on agreement that India accept that the Tibet Autonomous Region as a part of China, though India had already done so back in 1953. This mutual agreement led to a thaw in Sino-Indian relations.

Chinese Premier Wen Jiabao said in 2005 that "Sikkim is no longer the problem between China and India."

== Military awards ==
=== Maha Vir Chakra ===
Name	Unit	Place of action	Citation
Major Harbhajan Singh (P)	18 Rajput	Nathu La, Sikkim, India	
Brigadier Rai Singh Yadav	2nd Grenadiers	Nathu La, Sikkim, India	
Lieutenant Colonel Mahatam Singh	10 JAK Rifles	Cho La, Sikkim, India	

=== Vir Chakra ===
Name	Unit	Place of action	Citation
Captain Prithvi Singh Dagar (P)	2nd Grenadiers	Nathu La, Sikkim, India	
Havaldar Lakhsmi Chand (P)	2nd Grenadiers	Nathu La, Sikkim, India	
Sepoy Gokal Singh	18 Rajput	Nathu La, Sikkim, India	

== In popular culture ==
The Nathu La clashes between the Indian Army and Chinese Army are depicted in the 2018 Indian Hindi-language film Paltan (film), starring Jackie Shroff as Maj. General Sagat Singh, Arjun Rampal as Lt. Col. Rai Singh Yadav, Harshvardhan Rane as Maj. Harbhajan Singh, Gurmeet Choudhary as Capt. Prithvi Singh Dagar and Abhilash Chaudhary as Hav. Lakshmi Chand.

== See also ==
- Tibet–Ladakh–Mughal war
- 1841–1842 Dogra–Tibetan War
- 1962 Sino-Indian War
- 1987 Sumdorong Chu standoff
- 2017 China–India border standoff
- 2020–2021 China–India skirmishes
