= Paltan (film) =

2018 Indian film by J. P. Dutta

- Theatrical release poster
- Directed by: J.P. Dutta
- Based on: Nathu La and Cho La clashes
- Produced by: J.P. Dutta
- Starring: Jackie Shroff; Arjun Rampal; Sonu Sood; Gurmeet Choudhary; Harshvardhan Rane; Siddhanth Kapoor; Luv Sinha; Esha Gupta; Rohit Roy; Sonal Chauhan; Monica Gill; Dipika Kakar
- Cinematography: Shailesh AV Awasthhi Nigam Bomzan
- Edited by: Ballu Saluja
- Music by: Songs: Anu Malik; Background Score: Sanjoy Chowdhury
- Production companies: Zee Studios; JP Films
- Distributed by: Zee Studios
- Release date: 7 September 2018
- Running time: 154 minutes
- Country: India
- Language: Hindi
- Budget: ₹35 crore (Note: Budget figure includes print and advertising costs)
- Box office: est. ₹10.22 crore

Paltan (transl. Platoon; Hindi pronunciation: [pəlʈən]) is a 2018 Indian Hindi-language war film written, directed and produced by J. P. Dutta, based on 1967 Nathu La and Cho La clashes along the Sikkim border after 1962 Sino-Indian War. It stars an ensemble cast with Jackie Shroff, Arjun Rampal, Sonu Sood, Harshvardhan Rane, Rohit Roy, Sonal Chauhan, Monica Gill, Dipika Kakar and many more. The film was theatrically released on 7 September 2018.

== Plot ==
The film is Based on clashes between Indian and Chinese troops in the regions of Nathu La and Cho La in 1967 where Indian troops defeated Chinese troops and stopped their attempts to encroach on Indian territory.

An Indian platoon is deployed near China. After some days Chinese troops starts creating trouble by using loud speakers and by threatening Indian troops by going near the border. Indian troops does the same to quite the Chinese troops. One day Chinese and Indian troops engage in stone clashes and after that Indian troops start building the fence at border but it was later destroyed by People's Liberation Army.

Indian army tries to build border again but met with heavy fire by Chinese. Indian troops returned fire but were facing trouble by Chinese artillery. Indian commander asked troops to hold their positions till the Indian artillery arrives to support them. Both Side faces Casualties and Indian artillery arrives resulting in heavy Chinese casualties.

Indian troops won and were able to rain down heavy artillery firing on Chinese bunkers.

== Cast ==
- Jackie Shroff as Major General Sagat Singh, general officer commanding (GOC) 17 Mountain Division
- Arjun Rampal as Lt. Col. Rai Singh Yadav, CO, 2 Grenadiers
- Sonu Sood as Major Bishen Singh, Second in Command, 2 Grenadiers
- Gurmeet Choudhary as Captain Prithvi Singh Dagar, 2 Grenadiers
- Harshvardhan Rane as Major Harbhajan Singh, 18 Rajput Regiment now (13 Mechanised Infantry)
- Siddhanth Kapoor as Havildar Parashar, Intelligence Corps
- Luv Sinha as Second Lieutenant Attar Singh, 2 Grenadiers
- Rohit Roy as Major Cheema, Corps of Engineers
- Abhilash Chaudhary as Hawaldar Lakshmi Chand Yadav, 2 Grenadiers
- Nagender Choudhary as Naib Subedar Raghav Prasad Pandey, 18 Rajput Regiment now (13 Mechanised Infantry)
- Lao Sheng Hua Nelson as Chinese Political Commissar
- Sonal Chauhan as Maj. Bishen Singh's wife
- Monica Gill as Harjot Kaur, Maj. Harbhajan Singh's girlfriend
- Esha Gupta in a special appearance as Lt. Col. Rai Singh Yadav's wife
- Dipika Kakar as Capt. Prithvi Singh Dagar's fiancée

== Soundtrack ==
Paltan

Soundtrack album by Anu Malik
- Released: 28 August 2018
- Recorded: 2018
- Genre: Feature film soundtrack
- Length: 19:54
- Language: Hindi
- Label: Zee Music Company

Anu Malik chronology
Judwaa 2 (2017)	Paltan (2018)	Batti Gul Meter Chalu (2018)
External audio
- Official Audio Jukebox on YouTube

The background score of the film is composed by Sanjoy Chowdhury and songs are composed by Anu Malik. The lyrics are written by Javed Akhtar. The first song "Paltan Title Track" was released on 13 August 2018. The second song "Raat Kitni" was released on 21 August 2018. The music in the Paltan song is borrowed from the theme music of iconic 1957 Hollywood blockbuster The Bridge on the River Kwai.

Track listing
No.	Title	Singer(s)	Length
1.	"Paltan Title Track"	Divya Kumar, Irfan, Adarsh, Khuda Baksh	6:12
2.	"Raat Kitni"	Sonu Nigam	6:51
3.	"Main Zinda Hoon"	Sonu Nigam	6:51
Total length:			19:54

== Reception ==
On the review aggregator website Rotten Tomatoes, 29% of 7 critics' reviews are positive, with an average rating of 4.2/10.

Udita Jhunjhunwala of Firstpost gave 1.5/5 stars and wrote "Paltan is more testosterone and male ego than strategy or drama and, surprisingly, it’s tentative even in its jingoism."

Raja Sen gave it 1.5 (out of 5) stars, saying: "There is a lot to be said about the futility of war, and now Dutta has made his case for the futility of the war movie."

Devesh Sharma of Filmfare rated the film 3 out of 5 stars and wrote "All-in-all, the film might be a little melodramatic at times but its heart certainly is in the right place."

Ronak Kotecha of the Times of India rated 3/5, stating that "Paltan manages to undo some of the damage in its final moments that are truly action packed. Director JP Dutta fires all his ammo in a rousing climax for a bitter sweet victory."
