= Pranati Rai Prakash =

Indian actress and model

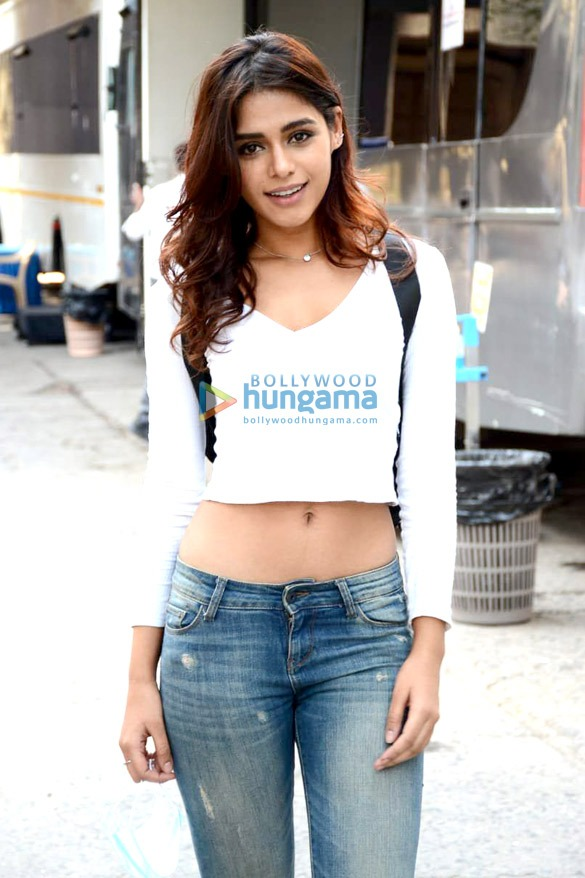
- Pranati In 2020
- Born: Dehradun
- Citizenship: India
- Education: National Institute of Fashion Technology, Mumbai
- Occupations: Model, Actor, Fashion stylist, Songwriter
- Parent(s): Col. Prem Prakash, Sadhana Rai
- Modeling information
- Height: 173 cm (5 ft 8 in)
- Hair color: black
- Eye color: black

Pranati Rai Prakash is an Indian actress and model known as the winner of India's Next Top Model. She was also a finalist at Miss India 2015. She has featured in several TV commercials and walked for Lakme Fashion Week and India International Bridal Week. She ventured into web series with her titular show being Mannphodganj Ki Binny.

== Early life ==
Pranati was born to Colonel Prem Prakash and Sadhana Rai. She was born in Dehradun and she hails from Patna in Bihar. Due to her father's job in the army, her family relocated to a number of places in India, including Srinagar, Port Blair, Bathinda, Mhow, Delhi, Thiruvananthapuram, Shillong, Delhi, Dehradun and Patna. She studied fashion communication from NIFT, Mumbai. She is currently based in Mumbai.

== Modelling career ==
She has received a lot of recognition because of her stint in the Miss India pageant of 2015 and was a major front runner there. Pranati won the titles of Miss Talented, Miss Fashion Icon and Miss Beautiful Legs at Femina Miss India and was 1st runner up in Miss Sudoku, Top 5 in National Costume round and Top 5 of Miss Body Beautiful. Pranati is the Winner of India's Next Top Model Season 2. During episode 3, makeovers occurred. Prakash's long black hair was cut as an auburn lob with bangs.

== Acting career ==
Key
| † | Denotes films that have not yet been released |

=== Films ===
| Year | Title | Role | Language | Ref. |
|---|---|---|---|---|
| 2019 | Family of Thakurganj | Suman | Hindi | |
| 2020 | Love Aaj Kal | Office Girl | Hindi | |
| 2022 | Odd Couple | Nivedita 'Navi' Rao | Hindi | |
| 2023 | Das Ka Dhamki | Special appearance in item number, "O Dollar Pillagaa" | Telugu | |

=== Television ===
| Year | Show | Role | Network | Notes | Ref. |
|---|---|---|---|---|---|
| 2016 | India's Next Top Model | Contestant | MTV | Winner | |
| 2018 | India's Next Superstars | Contestant | Star Plus | | |
| 2019 | Poison | Aashu | ZEE5 | | |
| 2020 | Mannphodganj Ki Binny | Binny | MX Player | | |
| 2021 | Cartel | Sumi | ALTBalaji | | |
