= Gaurav Gupta =

Indian couturier

Gaurav Gupta is an avant-garde Indian couturier. Gupta's work has been featured in events such Paris Haute Couture Week (on invitation of Fédération de la Haute Couture et de la Mode). His work is characterized by his origami style sculptural style patterns with pleating and lifting. Gupta is known to use traditional Indian embroidery techniques like zardozi, nakshi and dabka and borrow abstract patterns from nature. He is the third Indian designer to present at the couture week, following Rahul Mishra (who has consistently showcased since 2020) and Vaishali S (in 2021).

== Early life and career ==
Gupta grew up in New Delhi. His family owned a steel business. He graduated from the National Institute of Fashion Technology in 2000 and from Central Saint Martins in 2003. He then worked with Hussein Chalaya. He started his label, with his own name in 2005 with his brother as co-director. However the label was properly launched only in 2006, since Gupta went to Istanbul to work as an art director in Istanbul for a company.

Gupta's business model consists of both e-tail business and brick-mortar stores in Delhi, Hyderabad, Kolkata and Mumbai. In United States, the business uses multi-designer store Neiman Marcus and online retailer Moda Operandi for retail. He also introduced a fine jewelry collection and hosted an art exhibition at the National Gallery of Modern Art in Mumbai. In 2019, he introduced his home decor label, displayed at Gupta's flagship store in Mehrauli, New Delhi.

Indian Express credited him for reviving bridal couture in India. He also collaborated with IBM to create an artificial intelligence-inspired sari-gown using IBM Watson. Lately, a collaborative effort between Gupta and perfumer Jahnvi Lakhota Nandan resulted in the fragrance named ‘Again’. Gupta was included in a British documentary for London Olympics 2012. The journey began when rapper Cardi B chose to wear his cream-toned sculptural dress in the remix video of "No Love" (March 2022).

== Notable Clients/Events ==
Throughout the year 2022, Gupta provided attire for prominent figures such as Megan Thee Stallion at the Oscars, Aishwarya Rai Bachchan at Cannes, Cardi B in a music video, as well as Lizzo, Kylie Minogue, Maluma at the Latin Billboards, and Fan Bingbing.

Cardi B in early February was seen wearing a wavy cobalt blue dress in the Grammys red carpet that was designed by Gupta. The star and creator of the sitcom “Abbott Elementary’, Quinta Brunson, was also seen wearing a Gaurav Gupta design the color of café au lait, while hosting the Billboard Women in Music Awards ceremony.

During her Atlanta performance, Beyoncé wore a distinctive neon green sari, a customary South Asian attire crafted by Gaurav Gupta, which was a part of the Renaissance world tour wardrobe, featuring three distinct looks.

His work has been worn by Tems, Angela Bassett, Priyanka Chopra, Natasha Poonawalla, Kriti Sanon, Janhvi Kapoor, Kareena Kapoor Khan, Shakira (for the cover of Billboard), Vijay Varma, Deepika Padukone, Aja Naomi King, Michaela Jaé Rodriguez, Diipa Büller-Khosla, Jennifer Hudson (at 2022 Producers Guild Awards), Jenna Ortega (at Saturday Night Live), Jr NTR at the Oscars, Mary J Blige to the Time 100 Gala, Bebe Rexha, Sharon Stone, Luis Fonsi, Ashanti, Thalia, Jeremy Pope and Saweetie and many others. Among his various global engagements was his participation in Prince Charles' annual Animal Ball charity event in London, where he crafted a masquerade mask inspired by hummingbirds. In 2019, Gaurav's brand collaborated with Maison Bose, a luxury communication consultancy in Los Angeles.

== Personal life ==
In an interview with Vogue Gupta shared his experiences growing up as a gay individual in 1990s India. The conversation explored the challenges he faced in pursuing his passion and how those struggles still shape his work today.
