= Rai Singh Yadav =

Indian Military Officer

Brigadier Rai Singh Yadav MVC
- Born: 17 March 1925; Kosli, Gurgaon district, Punjab Province, British India
- Died: 23 March 2017 (aged 92)
- Relatives: Rai Sahib Ganpat Singh (father)
- Military career
- Allegiance: India
- Branch: Indian Army
- Rank: Brigadier
- Unit: The Grenadiers
- Commands: 2 Grenadiers
- Conflicts: Nathu La and Cho La clashes 1967
- Awards: Maha Vir Chakra

Brigadier Rai Singh Yadav, MVC (17 March 1925 – 23 March 2017) was an officer in the Indian Army notable for his participation in the Nathu La and Cho La clashes 1967. He displayed exemplary courage and leadership during the clashes, for which he was awarded the Maha Vir Chakra, India's second highest military decoration. He is also known as the Tiger of Nathu La.

== Early life ==
Rai Singh Yadav was born in the village of Kosli in Gurgaon district of Punjab Province (now in Rewari district of Haryana) on 17 March 1925. His father was Rai Sahib Ganpat Singh who had served in the British Indian Army in 1920s. Rai Singh passed his Senior Cambridge from King George Military School, Jullundur.

== Military career ==
Rai Singh joined the Army as Second Lieutenant in 1944. He was commissioned into 2 Grenadiers on 10 December 1950.

In 1967, with the rank of Lt Col, he was commanding the 2 Grenadiers battalion deployed at Nathu La, Sikkim, when the Chinese Army attempted incursions into Indian held territory, leading to the Nathu La and Cho La clashes. In order to hold on to the Nathu La pass and defeat the Chinese attempted incursions, Lt Col Rai Singh led his men from the front and displayed conspicuous bravery and exceptional leadership in the face of the enemy.

== In popular culture ==
Brigadier Rai Singh Yadav's character was played by Bollywood actor Arjun Rampal in the 2018 Indian Hindi-language film Paltan (film).

== See also ==
- Nathu La and Cho La clashes
