= Kusumdesar =

Village in India

Coordinates: 27°57′52″N 74°43′25″E

Kusumdesar is a village in Ratangarh Tehsil in Churu district of Rajasthan State, India. Notable people from the village include Lieutenant General Sagat Singh. The village has a secondary school, Government Higher Secondary School.
