= Stock model =

A stock model is a person who is photographed for stock images using various poses, clothing, settings, and props, for advertisements and media projects, including photo manipulations. Stock model photographs are typically cheaper and more practical than hiring a model and a photographer.

Stock photographs aim to include models of varying genders, ethnicities, and sizes.

In recent years stock modeling has reached an all-time high, due in part to media projects on the Internet for businesses, home, school, and leisure. Various types of artists and marketing professionals benefit from the use of stock models. A vast number of photographers use their own collection of stock models for their projects
