= Diipa Buller-Khosla =

Indian fashion influencer

- Education: Utrecht University
- Occupations: Fashion influencer, entrepreneur and content creator
- Spouse: Oleg Buller-Khosla (2018)

Diipa Buller-Khosla is an Indian-born fashion influencer, digital content creator and entrepreneur. She is the co-founder of the beauty brand indē wild and is known for her work in fashion and beauty media, as well as for public discussions related to cultural representation, motherhood, and body image.

== Early life and education ==
Buller-Khosla was born in India and spent her early childhood there. As a teenager, she moved to the Netherlands, where she completed her schooling. She earned a law degree from Utrecht University and later pursued postgraduate legal studies in the United Kingdom, focusing on international and human rights law.

During this period, she intended to pursue a career in law and international policy. She has stated in interviews that her academic background influenced her later engagement with issues of representation, equity, and advocacy in media and business.

== Career ==
=== Early career and digital media ===
After completing her studies, Bhuller-Khosla worked in digital media and influencer marketing in Europe, gaining experience in content strategy and brand partnerships. She later established an independent presence as a fashion and lifestyle content creator. Her online platforms cover fashion, beauty, and personal style, and she has also discussed topics related to identity, culture, and representation. Her content has primarily been distributed through social media and digital campaigns.

=== Fashion work ===
Buller-Khosla has attended international fashion events, including the Cannes Film Festival. Her styling often combines contemporary global fashion with Indian clothing, jewellery, and design elements.

She has collaborated with beauty brands such as MAC Cosmetics, Estée Lauder, and Maybelline, and has appeared in campaigns and editorial features. Her work has been discussed in the context of South Asian representation in global fashion media.

=== Beauty entrepreneurship ===
In 2021, Buller-Khosla co-founded indē wild, a beauty brand focusing on hair care and skin care products. The brand combines ingredients and practices inspired by traditional Indian beauty with modern cosmetic formulations. Buller-Khosla has been involved in the brand's development and public communication.

=== Motherhood and public discourse ===
Buller-Khosla has publicly discussed motherhood, post-pregnancy physical changes, and balancing parenting with a career in digital media and entrepreneurship. In 2021, she appeared at the Cannes Film Festival wearing a dress adapted to accommodate breast pumps, approximately three months after giving birth. The appearance received attention in the context of breastfeeding and working motherhood.

=== Social initiatives ===
Buller-Khosla is a co-founder of Post For Change, a social initiative that uses digital platforms to raise awareness about issues including women's health, gender equality, and mental well-being. The initiative has collaborated with organisations such as UN Women on campaigns addressing gender equity and menstrual health.

== Awards and recognition ==
- Harper's Bazaar Women of the Year, 2025
- ELLE List: India's Global Entrepreneur of the Year
- Featured in GQ India's 35 Most Influential Young Indians
- Included in Vogue Forces of Fashion, 2023

== Personal life ==
Buller-Khosla is married to Oleg Buller-Khosla, and the couple has one child. She has spoken publicly about family life and work–life balance in the context of maintaining a public-facing career after becoming a mother.
