= Varun Mehta =

Indian short film and animation filmmaker

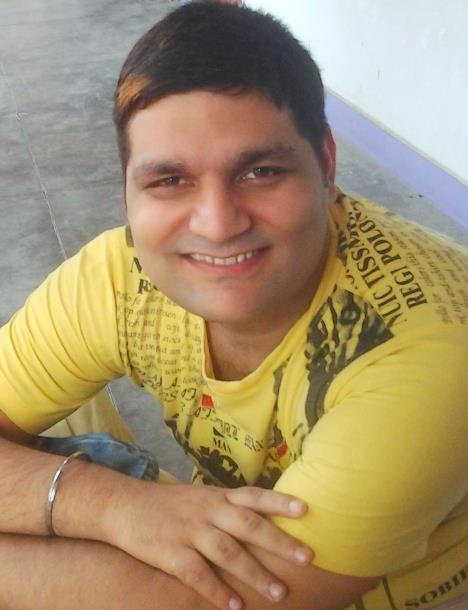
- Born: India
- Occupation: Filmmaker
- Known for: The Unknown World, The Wonder Stone

Varun Mehta is an Indian short film and animation filmmaker. Mehta is known for his critically acclaimed short films based on social and environmental issues. He is mainly known for his work for internationally acclaimed films like The Unknown World "The Wonder Stone" and "Save Trees".

== Background ==
Varun Mehta hails from Aligarh City of India. He has set up his film studio where he produces animation and short films. At present Mehta has made around 30 award-winning short films featuring both animated and non-animated. His biggest achievement till date is winning 'Buzzgoo' Short Film Competition where he won the 'Best Film' award for his film 'The Unknown World' with a prize money of $5000 at US. Mehta was felicitated at the 10th International Children's Film Festival Lucknow in 2018

== Filmography ==
- The Unknown World - Animated Short Film
- The Wonder Stone - Science Fiction Film
- Save Trees - Animated Short Film
- The Art of Farming - Documentary Short Film
- Ramu, A Gardener's Story - Documentary Short Film
- Diwali The Festival of Lights - Short Film based on the festival of Deepawali.
- Environmental Festival - Documentary Feature
- My Last Visions - Short Film
- A Dream that defined Science - Short Film
- Sometimes...Faith is Everything - Short Film (Upcoming)
- Travel and Life - Documentary Short Film (Upcoming)
