= Sat Shri Akaal England =

- Theatrical release poster
- Directed by: Vikram Pradhan
- Screenplay by: Jatinder Lall; Vikram Pradhan
- Story by: Vikram Pradhan
- Produced by: Sagoon Wagh; Nick Bahl
- Starring: Ammy Virk; Monica Gill; Karamjit Anmol; Sardar Sohi; Shehnaaz Kaur Gill
- Cinematography: Pradeep Khanvilkar
- Edited by: Bharat Singh Rawat
- Music by: Jatinder Shah
- Production companies: Kuasmedia Entertainment; Sizzlin Productions
- Release date: 8 December 2017
- Running time: 128 minutes
- Country: India
- Language: Punjabi

Sat Shri Akaal England (English : Greetings England) is a 2017 Indian Punjabi romantic comedy film written and directed by Vikram Pradhan. It stars Ammy Virk and Monica Gill. The film was shot in Chandigarh and England. The film was released worldwide on 8 December 2017.

== Plot ==
Sat Shri Akaal England is a romcom story of a foolish but sweet and honest youth named German Singh Maan who dreams of migrating out of India but fails to get visa in each of his interview with the consulate officer as he doesn't know to lie. A travel agency then arranges a fake marriage for him with Geet, a UK citizen, for ₹17 lakh in order to get a visa for German under the spouse category, But when Geet arrives to his village in India for the fake marriage, German actually falls in love with her as she is very modern and beautiful.

German and his father pays Geet and her broker Lakkha the agreed charges after keeping a balance amount which German agrees to settle once he reaches UK. However Geet and Lakkha keep taking more money from German during the marriage ceremony and German keeps giving it to them as he wants the fake marriage to look real in front of his relatives.

German then gets his UK visa due to the marriage (fake) with Geet but on arrival in London, German claims to have no money to pay the balance for the citizenship and will pay it by working in London. German then gets a job as a truck driver and also finds favour with the truck owner as he works sincerely. One day during transportation he gives lift to a stranger and they park the truck and drink inside the cabin and in their drunken state while trying to switch on the truck's music system the stranger passenger presses some other switch and de-rails the container. German very foolishly drives the truck without the container and reaches his destination but realises his folly when the supermarket person points out that he has come without the container and the fresh food items. The truck owner fires German and he therefore gets another job as a tailor in an Indian Fashion Boutique.

German approaches Geet and confesses his love to her only to find out that she is already friendly with Ricky and is planning to marry him. Geet insults German on the scene, making him leave disappointedly.

Later Geet and Lakkha are arrested by the UK Border Agency for suspicion in the fake marriage visa fraud. Geet claims to the police that her marriage with German is not fake but real, the police hence tells her to bring her husband German along to the police station for an interview after a week, to prove to the police that their love and marriage is real.

Ricky flees immediately after hearing that she is arrested; Geet, helpless, then approaches to German for help. German is unwilling to help her at first because she insulted him, but is later persuaded by her apology. Geet takes German to her home to live with her parents to prepare for the interview by practicing to be a real couple. During German's stay in Geet's house, they find that Ricky is a fraud that framed her years ago, which is the exact reason that Geet did all those visa fraud because she needed a lot money to pay a blackmailer. German leaves a good impression to Geet's family including Geet; Geet then falls for him.

Geet and German pass the interview at UK Border Agency by convincing officers their love is true and are set free.

== Cast ==
- Ammy Virk as Major German Singh Maan
- Monica Gill as Geet Kaur Kahlon
- Karamjit Anmol as Lakkha
- Sardar Sohi as German's Father
- Satwant Kaur as Satwant Kaur Kahlon (Geet's mother)
- Rupinder Rupi
- Baljinder Darapuri
- Parminder Gill
- Shehnaaz Kaur Gill as Sonia Khanna

== Soundtrack ==
The music of Sat Shri Akaal England which has been composed by Jatinder Shah was released by Saga Music on 13 November 2017.

Tracklist
No.	Title	Lyrics	Music	Singer(s)	Length
1.	"Dhan Paani Ho Jaanda"	Vinder Nathu Majra	Jatinder Shah	Karamjit Anmol	02:58
2.	"Jatt Da Kaleja"	Happy Raikoti	Jatinder Shah	Ammy Virk	02:34
3.	"Gal Theek Nai"	Maninder Kailey	Jatinder Shah	Jyoti Nooran	04:57
4.	"Tappay"	Harman	Jatinder Shah	Gurshabad & Gurlez Akhtar	03:26
5.	"Vich Videsha De"	Vinder Nathu Majra	Jatinder Shah	Karamjit Anmol	02:14
Total length:					16:09
