= Plastic Toys =

English electronic rock band

- Origin: Southampton, England
- Genres: Rock, alternative rock, post-grunge, electronica
- Years active: 2004–2009
- Label: Hill Valley Records
- Members: Jon Plastic; Alex Howe; Si Jackson; Sammy Lee
- Website: http://www.plastictoys.co.uk

Plastic Toys were an English electronic rock band, formed in late 2003 based in Southampton, England. The band's debut single, "Let Me Feel The Love", was released in July 2007 by Pinnacle Distribution, and went straight into the UK Indie Chart at number 30. Their debut album, For Tonight Only was released on 4 February 2008. It went on to be given glowing reviews by Classic Rock and Metal Hammer.

== Discography ==
=== Albums ===
For Tonight Only - released by Hill Valley Records (February 2008)

1. "Curtain Up" (0.56)
2. "Devil" (3.36)
3. "Let Me Feel The Love" (3.17)
4. "Still Alive" (4.05)
5. "Dirty" (2.49)
6. "The Tragedy" (4.41)
7. "Tonight Only" (3.12)
8. "Freak Among The Freaks" (3.34)
9. "Spaceman" (2.49)
10. "Miss You" (4.01)
11. "The World Goes Bang" (4.15)
12. "Goddamn You All" (5.20)
13. "Goodbye" (4.34)

Bonus Tracks: (Available with first 500 copies)

1. "Fever"
2. "Devil (Acoustic)"
3. "Tonight Only (Acoustic)"

=== Singles ===
- "Let Me Feel The Love" - released on Hill Valley Records (July 2007)

Described as "marking the moment electro pop became stadium rock with throbbing synths and beats, a hook that Marc Bolan would be proud of and massive, fuzzy guitar riffs.". Entirely self-funded, self-recorded and self-produced, "Let Me Feel The Love" was mixed by Andy Gray, the co-writer of the Channel 4 Big Brother theme tune and mastered in Los Angeles by Tom Baker (Nine Inch Nails, Marilyn Manson, My Chemical Romance). The single was available at high-street stores HMV, Apple iTunes and Amazon.

=== B-sides and unreleased ===
- "Superfreak" (B-side of "Let Me Feel The Love")
- "Flesh"
- "Just Like You"
- "Fabulous"
- "Real Life"
- "Fever" (Bonus track on album)
- "Nowhere"
- "Plastic"
- "Come Home" (available on iTunes as a bonus track on the album)

=== Previous members ===
- Mike Vaughan - Drums
- Kitty Brooks - Bass
- Ben Coley - Drums
