= Lashkaraa =

Indian clothing retailer

Lashkaraa, Inc.
- Company type: Private company
- Industry: Retail
- Founded: 2014; 12 years ago
- Founder: Sumeer Kaur
- Headquarters: United States
- Area served: United States, Canada, United Kingdom, Middle East
- Products: Clothing, fashion accessories, jewelry
- Website: www.lashkaraa.com

Lashkaraa is a fashion house based in the United States. Founded in 2014, the brand is known for manufacturing Indian ethnic wear, especially wedding attire.

In addition to traditional Indian clothes, Lashkaraa also manufactures jewelry and accessories for women. Lashkaraa products are distributed in more than 40 countries through the company's own website and specialized e-commerce stores.

== History ==
Lashkaraa brand was launched in 2014 by Sumeer Kaur. At the time, Sumeer, who was 18 years old, was still working as a waitress in a restaurant and studying in college. The brand was originally founded to make Indian fashion accessible to people living outside India. The majority of Lashkaraa's consumers are Indians based in the US, Canada, the UK, and the Middle East.

In 2020–2021 Lashkaraa focused on increasing its workforce and doubling its design team during the COVID-19 lockdowns. As a result, the company's production increased and 3 to 4 new collections were produced every month.

After years of presence in the US market Lashkaraa debuted in India in 2022. The same year, the brand's Garden of Serenity collection was launched at the Bombay Times Fashion Week held in Mumbai.

Lashkaraa brand is also known for applying a "modern approach" to India's traditional ethnic wear.

== Operations and retail ==
Lashkaraa's clothing lines are the result of collaboration with local artisans who have experience with Indian fashion, in turn providing them with resources and technology.

Eventually Lashkaraa made online retailing the core of its business operations, while claiming to provide Indians who are unable to visit their country a Mitti ki Khushboo (fragrance of their soil) experience. The brand's product lines include traditional Indian clothing such as shararas, lehengas, ghagras, saris, churidar, salwar, sherwani and suits.

== Brand exposure ==
Lashkaraa's products are worn by collaborators from the television and film industry, including actresses Karishma Kapoor and Janhvi Kapoor.
