= Colors Infinity =

Indian pay television channel

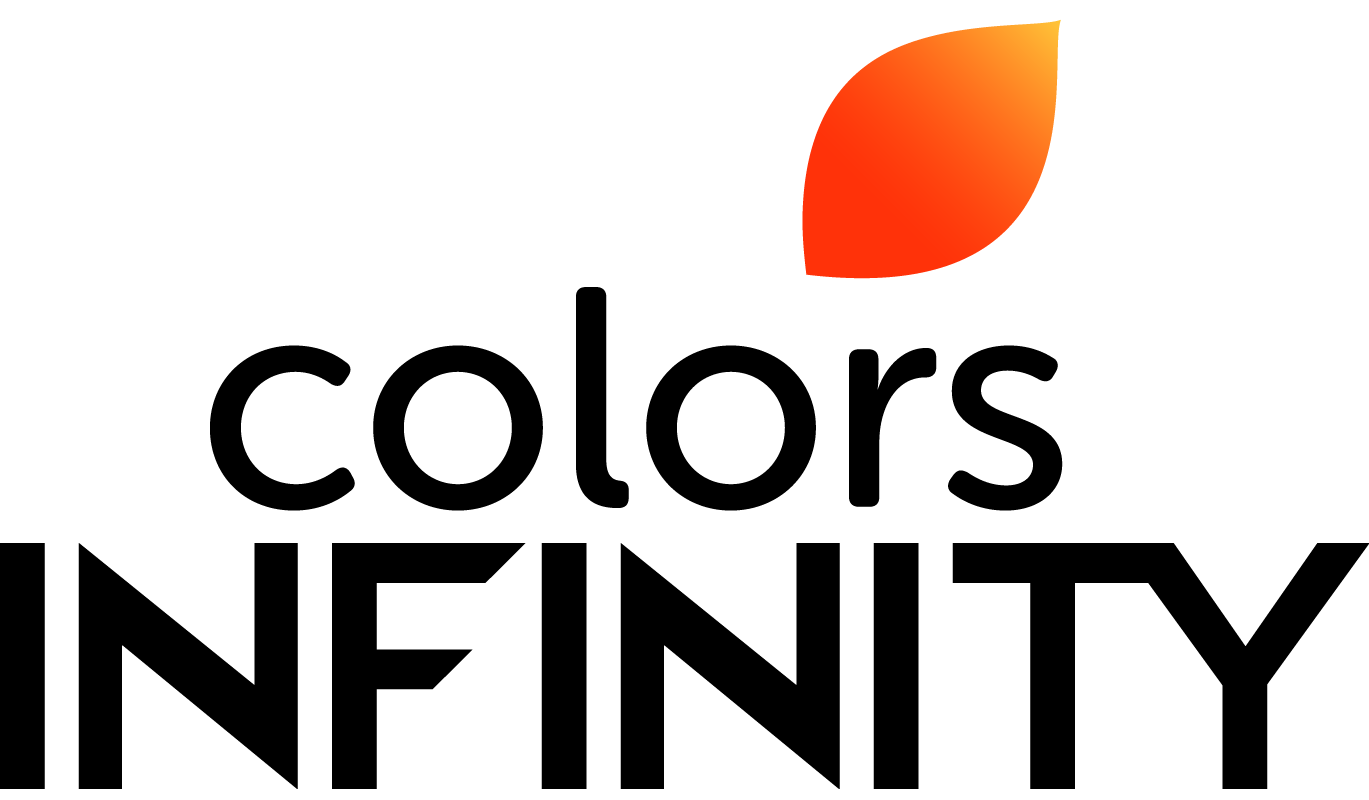
- Long used since 2018
- Country: India
- Broadcast area: Indian subcontinent

Programming
- Language: English
- Picture format: 1080p HDTV

Ownership
- Owner: JioStar

History
- Launched: 31 July 2015; 11 years ago

Links
- Website: colorsinfinity.com

Availability

Streaming media
- JioHotstar: India

Colors Infinity is an Indian pay television channel owned by JioStar, a joint venture between Viacom18 and Disney India. Launched on July 31, 2015, it primarily broadcasts English-language entertainment programming, including American and British television series, reality shows, and lifestyle programming. The channel is aimed at the urban, English-speaking audience in India.

== History ==
Colors Infinity was launched as part of Viacom18's expansion into the English-language entertainment space in India. It was positioned to compete with other established channels in the genre, such as Star World and Zee Café. The channel was co-curated at launch by prominent Indian film personalities Karan Johar and Alia Bhatt, who were involved in selecting the initial programming lineup.

== Programming ==
=== Current programming ===
- Dexter: New Blood
- Elementary
- Jane The Virgin
- Veep
- Dan Brown's The Lost Symbol
- Why Women Kill
- Tulsa King
- Evil
- Corporate

=== Former programming ===
==== Comedy-drama ====
- Ballers
- The Bold Type
- The Big C
- Fargo
- Girlfriends' Guide to Divorce
- Girls
- God Friended Me
- Imposters
- Katy Keene
- Life Sentence
- Mozart in the Jungle
- Somebody Somewhere
- Utopia

=== Drama ===
- 12 Monkeys
- Absentia
- Allegiance
- American Odyssey
- Arrow
- The Art of More
- Atlantis
- Bates Motel
- The Blacklist: Redemption
- Barry
- Batwoman
- Black Lightning
- Black Mirror
- Blindspot
- Broadchurch
- Better Call Saul
- Big Little Lies
- Chasing Life
- Chicago Fire
- Chicago Med
- Chicago P.D.
- Constantine
- Continuum
- Curb Your Enthusiasm
- Chesapeake Shores
- Covert Affairs
- Damages
- Dexter
- Deception
- Doom Patrol
- Downton Abbey
- Elsbeth
- Entourage
- Emerald City
- Fantasy Island
- Forever
- Frequency
- Game of Silence
- Game of Thrones
- The Gilded Age
- The Good Doctor
- The Good Karma Hospital
- Gossip Girl
- Grimm
- Heartbeat
- Heroes
- Heroes Reborn
- The Honourable Woman
- Houdini & Doyle
- Humans
- House of the Dragon
- High Maintenance
- Industry
- iZombie
- Kingdom
- The Last Ship
- Law & Order: Special Victims Unit
- Legends
- Lucifer
- Mad Dogs
- The Magician
- Manhattan
- Mr. Robot
- The Musketeers
- Nashville
- The Night Shift
- The Newsroom
- NCIS: New Orleans
- Notorious
- Orange Is the New Black
- Outlander
- Pearson
- The Player
- Powers
- Pretty Little Liars
- Pretty Little Liars: The Perfectionists
- Pure Genius
- The Red Line
- Reverie
- Riverdale
- The Royals
- Salem
- Satisfaction
- Shades of Blue
- Snatch
- Southland
- State of Affairs
- Suits
- Succession
- Sharp Objects
- Sex and the City
- Scavengers Reign
- Silicon Valley
- Transplant
- Taken
- Timeless
- Troy
- Tyrant
- The Village
- The Sex Lives Of College Girls
- The Blacklist
- The Sopranos
- True Detective
- The Last of Us
- The Night Of
- The Pitt
- The Franchise
- The Rehearsal
- The Time Traveler's Wife
- The Comeback

==== Reality ====
- America's Got Talent
- America's Got Talent: The Champions
- America's Next Top Model
- The Bachelor Winter Games
- Born Stylish
- The Great British Bake Off
- Junior Bake Off
- Last Week Tonight with John Oliver
- My Kitchen Rules
- Nigella: At My Table
- Nadiya's Family Favourites
- So You Think You Can Dance
- The Stage
- Top Model India
- Strictly Come Dancing
- Shark Tank
- Oliver's Twist
- Vogue BFFs

==== Sitcoms ====
- 2 Broke Girls
- American Woman
- The Odd Couple
- The Big Bang Theory
- Living Biblically
- Mike & Molly
- Man with a Plan
- Schitt's Creek
- Two and a Half Men
- The Neighborhood
