= Dabboo Ratnani =

Indian fashion photographer

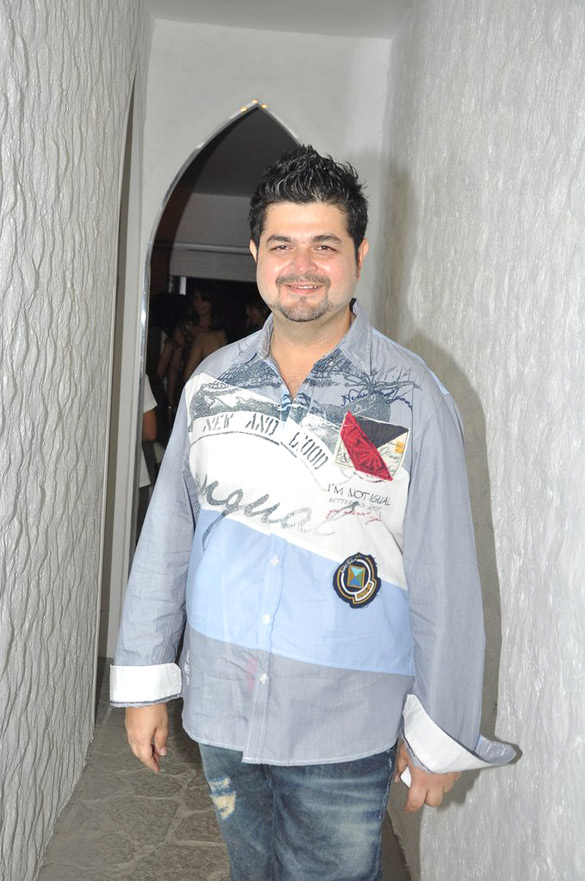
- Dabboo in 2012
- Born: Mumbai, Maharashtra, India
- Education: M. M. K. College
- Occupations: Fashion photography, Celebrity Photography
- Known for: Dabboo Ratnani Annual Calendar
- Spouse: Manisha D. Ratnani (m. 2004)
- Children: 3

Dabboo Ratnani (born Dhaporshankh Ratnani) is an Indian fashion and commercial photographer, known for his annual calendar, first published in 1999. He has shot cover photographs for magazines, including GQ, Filmfare, Hello, Stardust, Femina, etc.

== Early life ==
Ratnani was born in Mumbai, Maharashtra. He studied Commerce, from M.M.K. College. He started practicing photography as a photographer in Mumbai. He worked as an assistant photographer with Sumit Chopra for almost 3 years. He used to shoot for commercial products and then he started his own work in 1995.

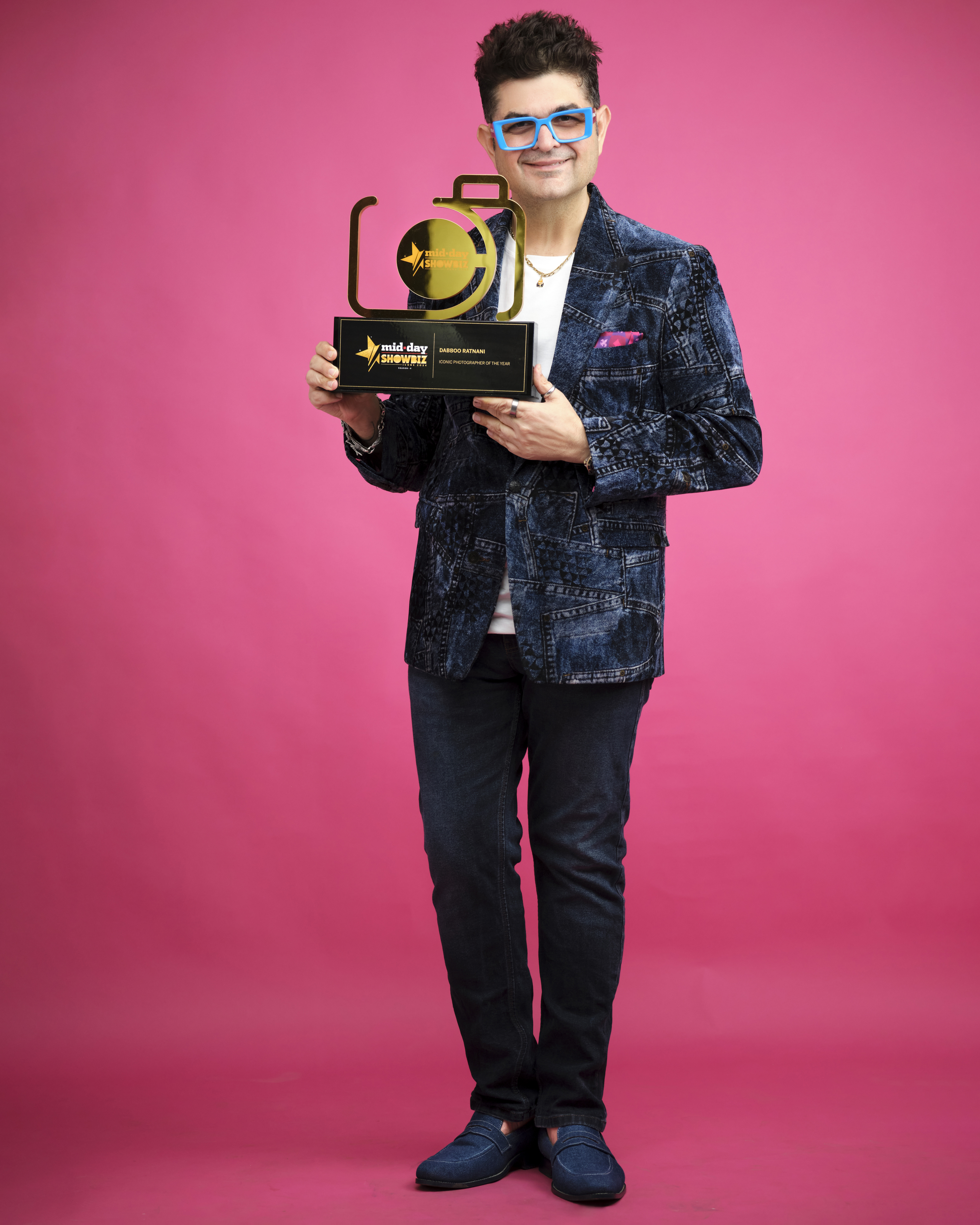
Ratnani awarded as Mid-day Iconic Photographer of the Year

== Career ==
In 2006, he was in the jury for the Miss India contest. Ratnani was a mentor for the India's Next Top Model show, which aired on MTV India. In 2020, Ratnani was featured in the N4M List of Top 10 fashion photographers of India.

He has shot cover photographs for Better Homes and Gardens.

=== Calendar ===
Ratnani's best known work is his annual calendar. The calendar shows 24 celebrities each year, including Bollywood stars. 18 of the 24 celebrities, including Amitabh Bachchan, Shahrukh Khan, Bipasha Basu, Arjun Rampal, Aishwarya Rai Bachchan and Abhishek Bachchan, are a constant feature on his calendar.

== Personal life ==
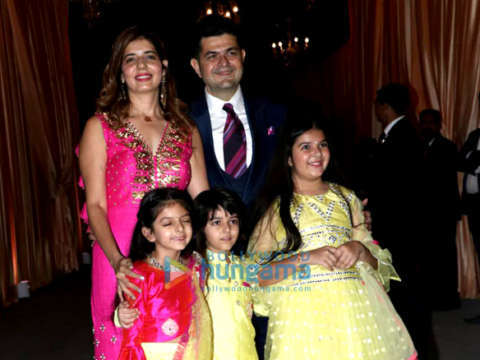
Ratnani with his wife Manisha and children

Ratnani married Manisha D. Ratnani in August 2004. They have a son, and two daughters named Shivaan Ratnani, Myrah Ratnani, Kiara Ratnani.
