= List of roles and awards of Kangana Ranaut =

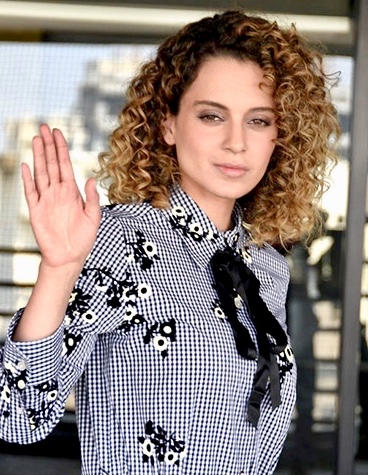
Ranaut in 2017

Kangana Ranaut is an Indian actress and filmmaker who predominantly works in Hindi films, in addition to a few Tamil films. She has received four National Film Awards, five Filmfare Awards, three International Indian Film Academy Awards, and one award each from the Screen, Zee Cine, SIIMA, and Producers Guild award ceremonies.

Ranaut made her acting debut in 2006 with a leading role in the romantic thriller Gangster, winning the Filmfare Award for Best Female Debut. Her portrayals of a character based on actress Parveen Babi in Woh Lamhe (2006) and a shrewd socialite in Life in a... Metro (2007) were lauded, with the latter earning her a Stardust Award for Breakthrough Performance – Female. She won the National Film Award for Best Supporting Actress and a Filmfare Award in the same category for playing a substance abusing supermodel in the drama Fashion (2008). Also in 2008, she featured in the Tamil film Dhaam Dhoom.

Ranaut featured in several commercially successful films, including the supernatural thriller Raaz: The Mystery Continues (2009), the crime film Once Upon a Time in Mumbaai (2010), the romantic comedy Tanu Weds Manu (2011), and the comedy Double Dhamaal (2011). For her role in Tanu Weds Manu, she received nominations for the Zee Cine and Screen Award for Best Actress. She followed this by playing brief roles in a series of box office flops that failed to propel her career forward. In 2013, Ranaut played Kaya, a shapeshifting mutant, in the science fiction film Krrish 3, which ranks among the highest-grossing Bollywood films. She received an IIFA Award for Best Supporting Actress nomination for it. Ranaut garnered critical acclaim for starring in the coming-of-age film Queen (2014), for which she also co-wrote the dialogues. She won several awards for Queen, including the National Film Award and the Filmfare Award for Best Actress. Ranaut played dual roles in the sequel Tanu Weds Manu: Returns (2015), which became the first female-led Hindi film to earn over ₹1 billion (US$11 million) in India. She received a Filmfare Critics Award and a second consecutive National Film Award for Best Actress for her performance.

This success was followed by a series of commercially failed films, which led to a decline in Ranaut's stardom. Her sole commercial success came with the 2019 period drama Manikarnika: The Queen of Jhansi, which she also co-directed. Her portrayal of freedom fighter Rani of Jhansi in it and a kabaddi player in the 2020 sports drama Panga jointly won her another National Film Award for Best Actress. Her portrayal of J. Jayalalithaa in the biopic Thalaivii (2021) won her a SIIMA Award for Best Actress – Tamil. In 2022, Ranaut hosted the streaming reality show Lock Upp to strong viewership. Further critical and commercial failures came with her 2023 releases, Chandramukhi 2 and Tejas, as well as her second directorial, Emergency (2025), in which she portrayed Indira Gandhi. In her latest film, Bharat Bhhagya Viddhaata (2026), Ranaut portrays a nurse who saved multiple lives at the Cama and Albless Hospital during the 2008 Mumbai attacks.

== Films ==
Key
†	Denotes films that have not yet been released

Year	Title	Role(s)	Language(s)	Notes	Ref(s)
2006	Gangster	Simran	Hindi		
2006	Woh Lamhe	Sana Azim	Hindi		
2007	Shakalaka Boom Boom	Ruhi	Hindi		
2007	Life in a... Metro	Neha	Hindi		
2008	Dhaam Dhoom	Shenba	Tamil		
2008	Fashion	Shonali Gujral	Hindi		
2009	Raaz: The Mystery Continues	Nandita Chopra	Hindi		
2009	Vaada Raha	Pooja	Hindi	Special appearance	
2009	Ek Niranjan	Sameera	Telugu		
2010	Kites	Gina Grover	Hindi		
2010	Once Upon a Time in Mumbaai	Rehana	Hindi		
2010	Knock Out	Nidhi Shrivastava	Hindi		
2010	No Problem	Sanjana	Hindi		
2011	Tanu Weds Manu	Tanuja "Tanu" Trivedi	Hindi		
2011	Game	Sia Agnihotri	Hindi		
2011	Ready	Kiran	Hindi	Special appearance	
2011	Double Dhamaal	Kiya	Hindi		
2011	Rascals	Khushi	Hindi		
2011	Miley Naa Miley Hum	Anishka Shrivastava	Hindi		
2012	Tezz	Nikita Malhotra	Hindi		
2013	Shootout at Wadala	Vidya Joshi	Hindi		
2013	Krrish 3	Kaya	Hindi		
2013	Rajjo	Rajjo	Hindi		
2014	Queen	Rani Mehra	Hindi	Also dialogue writer	
2014	Revolver Rani	Alka Singh	Hindi		
2014	Ungli	Maya	Hindi		
2015	Tanu Weds Manu Returns	Kusum "Datto" Sangwan/ Tanuja "Tanu" Trivedi (Note: Ranaut played dual roles in the film.)	Hindi		
2015	I Love New Year	Tikku Verma	Hindi		
2015	Katti Batti	Payal Saluja	Hindi		
2017	Rangoon	Julia	Hindi		
2017	Simran	Praful Patel	Hindi	Also co-writer	
2019	Manikarnika: The Queen of Jhansi	Rani Laxmibai	Hindi	Also co-director	
2019	Judgementall Hai Kya	Bobby Grewal	Hindi		
2020	Panga	Jaya Nigam	Hindi		
2021	Thalaivii	J. Jayalalithaa	Tamil; Hindi	Bilingual film	
2022	Dhaakad	Agent Agni	Hindi		
2023	Tiku Weds Sheru	Herself	Hindi	Special appearance; also producer	
2023	Chandramukhi 2	Chandramukhi	Tamil		
2023	Tejas	Tejas Gill	Hindi		
2025	Emergency	Indira Gandhi	Hindi	Also director and producer	
2026	Bharat Bhhagya Viddhaata	Geeta	Hindi	Also producer	
TBA	Circle †	TBA	Hindi; Tamil	Completed; Bilingual film	
TBA	Queen 2 †	TBA	Hindi	Completed	
TBA	Scary Picture †	TBA	Hindi	Completed	

== Television ==
Year	Title	Role	Notes	Ref(s)
2022	Lock Upp	Host	Reality show	
2026	Lock Upp 2: Sach Ya Saza	Guest	Reality show	

== Awards and nominations ==
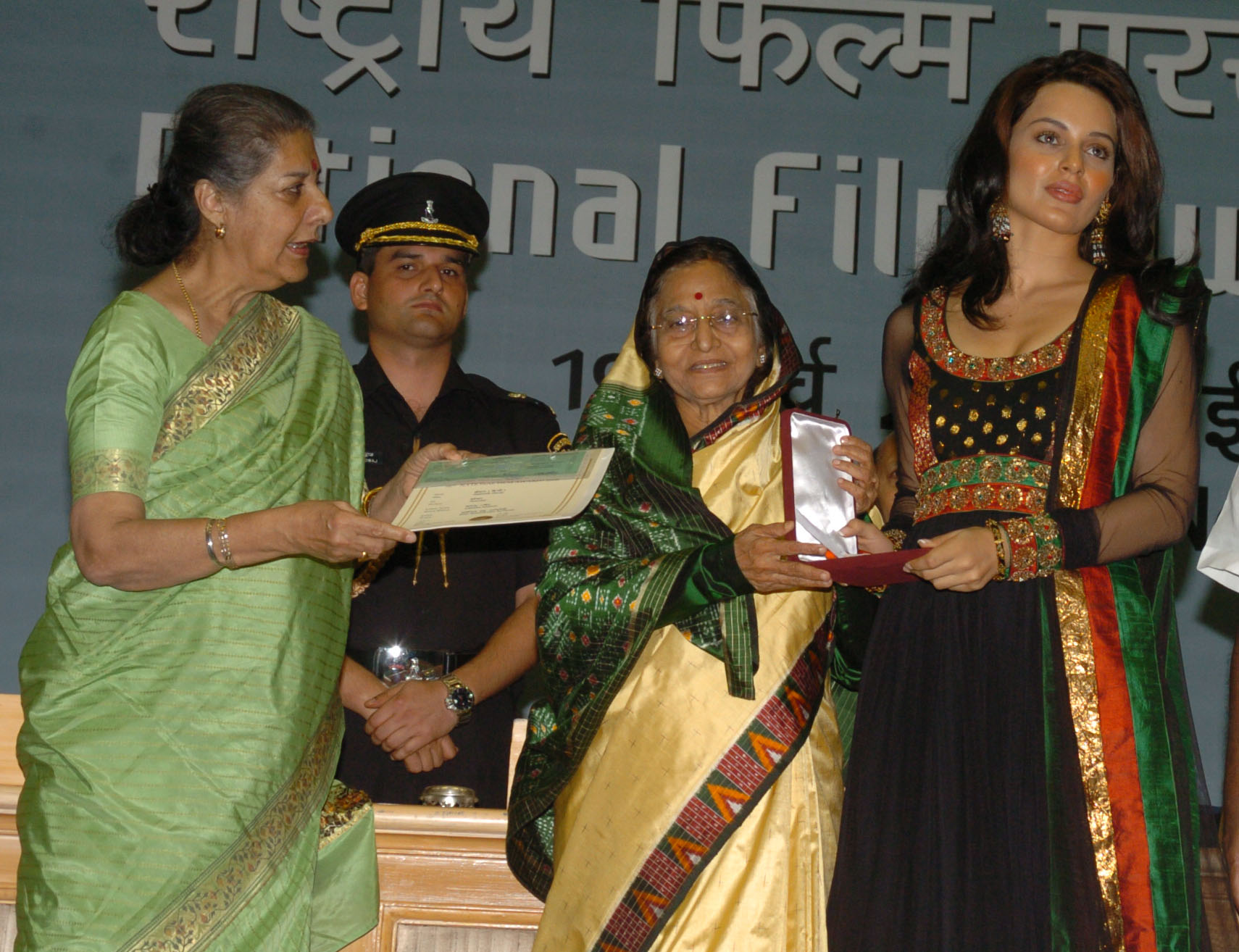
Ranaut at the 56th National Film Awards ceremony in 2010

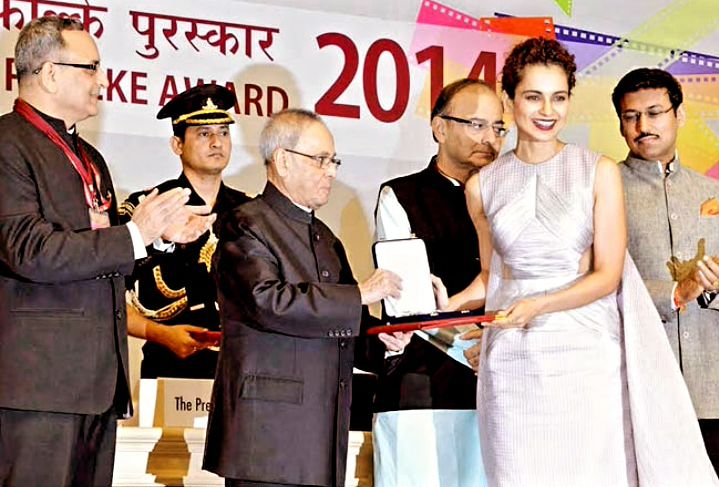
Ranaut at the 62nd National Film Awards ceremony in 2015

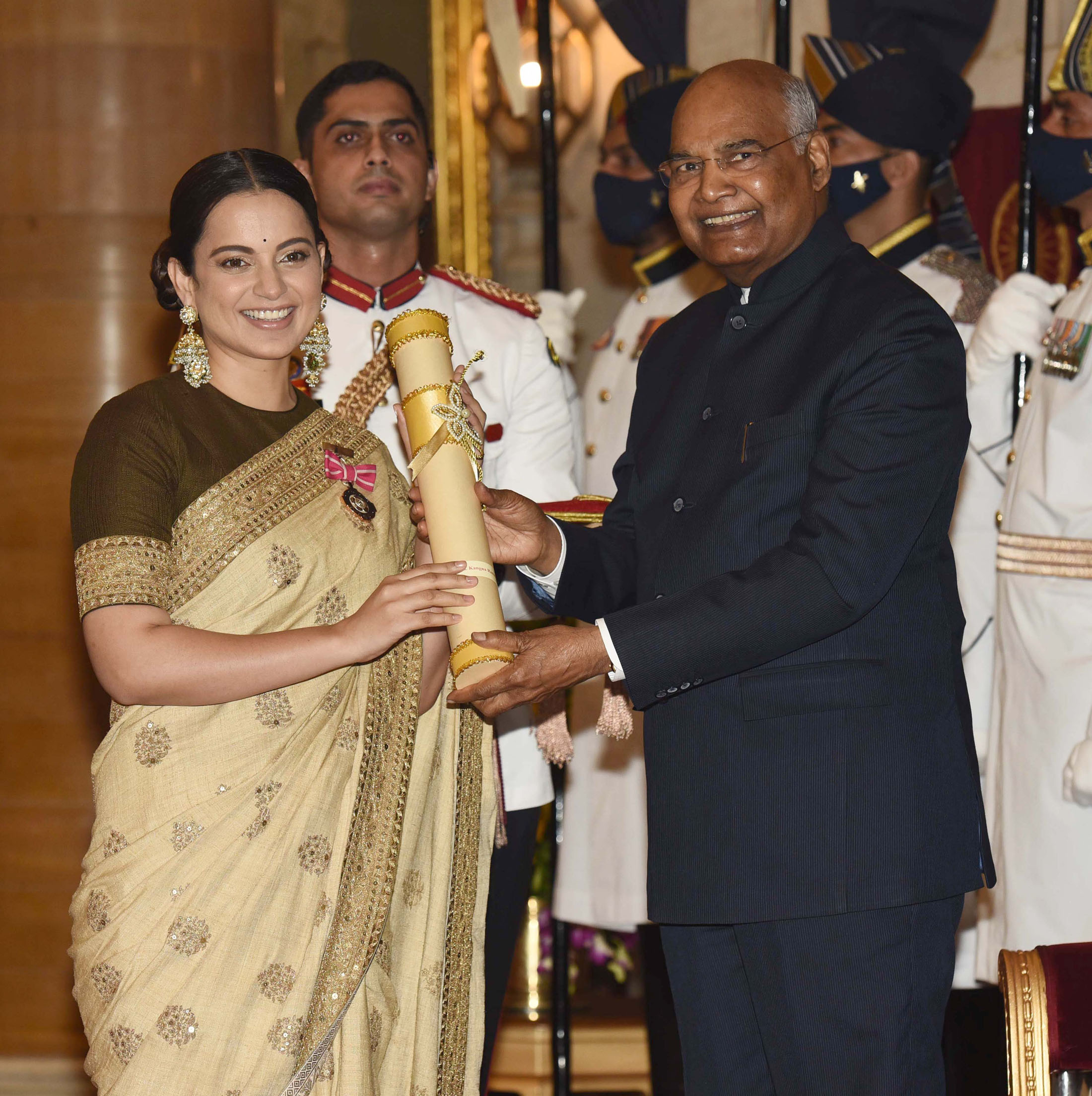
Ranaut at the 67th National Film Awards ceremony in 2021

Awards and nominations received by Ranaut
Year (Note: Refers to the year in which the ceremony was held.)	Award	Category	Work	Result	Ref(s)
2006	Global Indian Film Awards	Best Female Debut	Gangster	Won	
2006	Global Indian Film Awards	Best Actress	Gangster	Nominated	
2007	Asian Festival of First Films	Best Actress	Gangster	Won	
2007	Bollywood Movie Awards	Best Female Debut	Gangster	Won	
2007	Filmfare Awards	Face of the year	Gangster	Won	
2007	Filmfare Awards	Best Female Debut	Gangster	Won	
2007	International Indian Film Academy Awards	Best Female Debut	Gangster	Won	
2007	International Indian Film Academy Awards	Best Actress	Gangster	Nominated	
2007	Screen Awards	Most Promising Newcomer – Female	Gangster	Won	
2007	Zee Cine Awards	Best Female Debut	Gangster	Won	
2008	Stardust Awards	Superstar of Tomorrow – Female	Life in a... Metro	Won	
2008	Stardust Awards	Breakthrough Performance – Female	Life in a... Metro	Won	
2009	Filmfare Awards	Best Supporting Actress	Fashion	Won	
2009	International Indian Film Academy Awards	Best Supporting Actress	Fashion	Won	
2009	National Film Awards	Best Supporting Actress	Fashion	Won	
2009	Screen Awards	Best Supporting Actress	Fashion	Nominated	
2009	Producers Guild Film Awards (Note: Also known as Apsara Film & Television Producers Guild Awards.)	Best Actress in a Supporting Role	Fashion	Won	
2009	Stardust Awards	Best Supporting Actress	Fashion	Won	
2011	Stardust Awards	Best Actress – Thriller/Action	Once Upon a Time in Mumbaai	Nominated	
2011	Zee Cine Awards	Best Actor in a Supporting Role – Female	Once Upon a Time in Mumbaai	Nominated	
2012	Zee Cine Awards	Best Actor – Female	Tanu Weds Manu	Nominated	
2012	Screen Awards	Best Actress	Tanu Weds Manu	Nominated	
2012	Producers Guild Film Awards	Best Actress in a Leading Role	Tanu Weds Manu	Nominated	
2012	Stardust Awards	Best Actress – Comedy/Romance	Tanu Weds Manu	Nominated	
2012	International Indian Film Academy Awards	Best Actress	Tanu Weds Manu	Nominated	
2014	Screen Awards	Best Actress (Popular Choice)	Krrish 3 / Shootout at Wadala (Note: Ranaut received a single nomination for her roles in both films.)	Nominated	
2014	Screen Awards	Best Villain	Krrish 3	Nominated	
2014	International Indian Film Academy Awards	Best Supporting Actress	Krrish 3	Nominated	
2014	Producers Guild Film Awards	Best Actress in a Supporting Role	Krrish 3	Nominated	
2014	Zee Cine Awards	Best Actor in a Supporting Role – Female	Krrish 3	Nominated	
2014	NDTV Indian of the Year	Actor of the Year	—	Won	
2014	CNN-IBN Indian of the Year	Special Achievement Award	—	Won	
2014	Indian Film Festival of Melbourne	Best Actress	Queen	Won	
2014	Stardust Awards	Best Actress	Queen	Won	
2014	Stardust Awards	Star of the Year – Female	Queen	Nominated	
2014	BIG Star Entertainment Awards	Most Entertaining Actor (Film) – Female	Queen	Nominated	
2014	BIG Star Entertainment Awards	Most Entertaining Actor in a Social/Drama Film – Female	Queen	Nominated	
2015	Producers Guild Film Awards	Best Actress in a Leading Role	Queen	Nominated	
2015	Producers Guild Film Awards	Best Dialogue (shared with Anvita Dutt Guptan)	Queen	Nominated	
2015	Screen Awards	Best Actress	Queen	Nominated	
2015	Screen Awards	Best Actress (Popular Choice)	Queen	Nominated	
2015	Screen Awards	Best Dialogue (shared with Anvita Dutt Guptan)	Queen	Nominated	
2015	Filmfare Awards	Best Actress	Queen	Won	
2015	Filmfare Awards	Best Dialogue	Queen	Nominated	
2015	National Film Awards	Best Actress	Queen	Won	
2015	International Indian Film Academy Awards	Best Actress	Queen	Won	
2015	Stardust Awards	Best Actress	Tanu Weds Manu Returns	Nominated	
2015	BIG Star Entertainment Awards	Most Entertaining Actor in a Comedy Film – Female	Tanu Weds Manu Returns	Nominated	
2015	BIG Star Entertainment Awards	Most Entertaining Actor in a Romantic Film – Female	Tanu Weds Manu Returns	Nominated	
2015	BIG Star Entertainment Awards	Most Entertaining Actor in a Drama Film – Female	Tanu Weds Manu Returns	Nominated	
2016	Screen Awards	Best Actress (Popular Choice)	Tanu Weds Manu Returns	Nominated	
2016	Screen Awards	Best Actress	Tanu Weds Manu Returns	Nominated	
2016	Producers Guild Film Awards	Best Actress in a Leading Role	Tanu Weds Manu Returns	Nominated	
2016	Filmfare Awards	Best Actress (Critics)	Tanu Weds Manu Returns	Won	
2016	Filmfare Awards	Best Actress	Tanu Weds Manu Returns	Nominated	
2016	Zee Cine Awards	Best Actor – Female	Tanu Weds Manu Returns	Nominated	
2016	Zee Cine Awards	Critics Award for Best Actor – Female	Tanu Weds Manu Returns	Nominated	
2016	Times of India Film Awards	Best Actor – Female	Tanu Weds Manu Returns	Won	
2016	National Film Awards	Best Actress	Tanu Weds Manu Returns	Won	
2016	International Indian Film Academy Awards	Best Actress	Tanu Weds Manu Returns	Nominated	
2016	CNN-IBN Indian of the Year	Special Achievement Award	—	Won	
2018	Filmfare Awards	Best Actress (Critics)	Rangoon	Nominated	
2018	Screen Awards	Best Actress	Simran	Nominated	
2019	Screen Awards	Best Actress	Manikarnika: The Queen of Jhansi	Nominated	
2020	Padma Shri	Art	Civilian Award	Won	
2020	Filmfare Awards	Best Actress (Critics)	Judgementall Hai Kya	Nominated	
2020	Filmfare Awards	Best Actress	Manikarnika: The Queen of Jhansi	Nominated	
2021	Filmfare Awards	Best Actress	Panga	Nominated	
2021	National Film Awards	Best Actress	•Manikarnika: The Queen of Jhansi • Panga	Won	
2022	South Indian International Movie Awards	Best Actress – Tamil	Thalaivii	Won	
2026	Zee Cine Award	Best Actor – Female	Emergency	Nominated	
