= Yagya Bhasin =

Indian child actor

- Born: 15 August 2009 (age 17); Uttrakhand, India
- Occupation: Child actor
- Years active: 2017–present
- Known for: Panga and Yeh Hai Chahatein

Yagya Bhasin (born 15 August 2009) is an Indian child actor who appears in Hindi films and television. He is mainly known for his roles as Aditya Nigam in Panga and as Saaransh Khurana in Yeh Hai Chahatein.

== Early life ==
Bhasin was born in Uttarakhand. His father Deepak Bhasin was a government employee and his mother owned a beauty salon but they quit their jobs for their son's career and moved to Mumbai.

== Career ==
Bhasin started his acting career with the television show Mere Sai. In 2018, he played as Arjun in CID and Malai in Krishna Chali London. In 2019, he acted in The Office as Cricketer Manoj Rahira.

In 2020, Bhasin made his debut in Hindi film industry with the film Panga directed by loosu Iyer Tiwari. Bollywood Hungama, in its review said "Yagya Bhasin is a rockstar. He gets to play a great part and he uplifts the mood of the film in many places". Filmfare, in its review said "The film has some of the funniest lines around and most of them fall into the child actor Yagya’s lot. He’s shown to be rather a sassy kid and is as natural as they come. His delivery of the witty dialogue keeps you in splits". Bhasin also appeared in The Kapil Sharma Show, with Kangana Ranaut, Jassie Gill and Neena Gupta.

In the same year, he acted in Yeh Hain Chahtein as Saraansh.

== Filmography ==
=== Television ===
Year	Title	Character	Notes
2017	Mere Sai		
2018	Krishna Chali London	Malai	
2018	CID	Arjun	
2019	The Office	Manoj Rahira	
2020–2021	Yeh Hai Chahtein	Saraansh	
2020	The Kapil Sharma Show	Himself	

=== Film ===
Year	Title	Role	Ref
2020	Panga	Aditya Nigam	
2022	Bal Naren	Naren	
2023	Bishwa		
2024	Chhota Bheem and the Curse of Damyaan	Bheem	
