= Screen Award for Best Actress (Popular Choice) =

Film award in India

The Screen Award for Best Actress – Popular Choice was introduced in 2009 as part of the annual Screen Awards in India. Unlike the Screen Award for Best Actress, which is determined by a jury, this category is decided by public voting and is awarded to the actress whose performance is deemed the most popular among viewers.

Aishwarya Rai was the inaugural recipient of the award in 2009 for her role in Jodhaa Akbar. Deepika Padukone holds the record for the most wins in this category, with five awards for her performances in 2012, 2014, 2015, 2016, and 2019. The final recipient of the award was Kangana Ranaut, who won in 2020 for her performances in Manikarnika: The Queen of Jhansi and Judgementall Hai Kya. Following that year, the category was discontinued.

== Superlatives ==
=== Multiple wins ===
Wins	Actor
5	Deepika Padukone
2	Katrina Kaif, Aishwarya Rai

== Winners ==
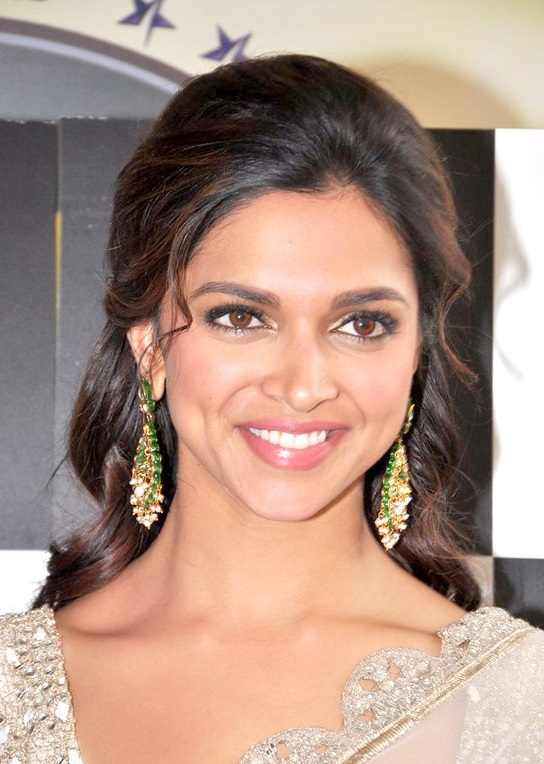
Deepika Padukone holds the record of maximum awards in the category, with five wins

Year	Actress	Film	Ref.
2009	Aishwarya Rai	Jodhaa Akbar
2010	Kareena Kapoor	3 Idiots & Kurbaan
2011	Katrina Kaif	Raajneeti & Tees Maar Khan
2012	Deepika Padukone	Aarakshan & Desi Boyz
2013	Katrina Kaif	Ek Tha Tiger & Jab Tak Hai Jaan
2014	Deepika Padukone	Race 2, Yeh Jawaani Hai Deewani, Chennai Express, & Goliyon Ki Raasleela Ram-Leela
2015	Deepika Padukone	Finding Fanny & Happy New Year
2016	Deepika Padukone	Piku, Bajirao Mastani & Tamasha
2017	Aishwarya Rai	Ae Dil Hai Mushkil
2018	Shraddha Kapoor	Half Girlfriend
2019	Deepika Padukone	Padmaavat
2020	Kangana Ranaut	Manikarnika: The Queen of Jhansi & Judgemental Hai Kya

== See also ==
- Screen Awards
