= The Emergency: A Personal History =

2015 book by Coomi Kapoor

- Author: Coomi Kapoor
- Language: English
- Subject: The Emergency, Politics of India
- Publisher: Viking Books
- Publication date: 25 June 2015
- Publication place: India
- Pages: 389
- ISBN: 9780670087587

The Emergency: A Personal History is a 2015 book by Indian journalist Coomi Kapoor.

The book is a personal reflection on the impact of The Emergency, when Indira Gandhi suspended democracy and civil liberties, on Kapoor and her family. Her husband, also a journalist was imprisoned and her family faced threats and harassment from security forces. The book also recounts the broader impact of the Emergency on Indian society. The book recalls the "drama the horror, as well as the heroism of a few, during those nineteen months, 40 years ago, when democracy was derailed".

== Reception ==
In Business Standard, Shreekant Sambrani praises the book as a "readable and thought-provoking personal account" and "immensely readable and engrossing" while in The Indian Express Pratap Bhanu Mehta also praises the book, describing it as a "riveting and necessary account of the elite politics of the Emergency".

The book was a key reference for the film Emergency (2025) directed by Kangana Ranaut. Upon its release Kapoor sent legal notices to Ranaut and the film’s digital partner Netflix, accusing them of distorting historical facts and misrepresenting her work.
