= Bal Naren =

- Directed by: Pawan Nagpal
- Screenplay by: Umang Saxena, Pawan Nagpal
- Story by: Pawan Nagpal
- Based on: Swachh Bharat Abhiyan
- Produced by: Deepak Mukut
- Starring: Yagya Bhasin; Bidita Bag; Rajneesh Duggal; Govind Namdev; Vindu Dara Singh; Lokesh Mittal
- Production company: Soham Rockstar Entertainment
- Release date: 11 November 2022
- Country: India
- Language: Hindi

Bal Naren is an Indian Hindi-language film starring Yagya Bhasin, Bidita Bag, Rajneesh Duggal, Govind Namdev, Vindu Dara Singh, and Lokesh Mittal. The film is written and directed by Pawan Nagpal and produced by Deepak Mukut. The film was scheduled to release on 14 October 2022 but postponed. now the film was released on 11 November 2022.

== Cast ==
- Yagya Bhasin as Naren (central character)
- Bidita Bag
- Rajneesh Duggall
- Govind Namdev
- Vindu Dara Singh
- Lokesh Mittal
- Jitender Gaur

== Plot ==
The film is inspired by the Swachh Bharat Abhiyan and the importance of cleanliness during the pandemic. The idea of cleanliness and how a 14-year-old boy with his determination and efforts stopped his village from getting any cases of COVID-19.

== Soundtrack ==
Bal Naren

Soundtrack album by Javed Ali, Harshdeep Kaur
- Genre: Film soundtrack
- Label: Soham Rockstar Entertainment
- Producer: Manish Sahriya

=== Track list ===
All music is composed by Manish Sahriya.

Track Listing
No.	Title	Artist	Length
1.	"Ram Ji Aayege (title)"	Harshdeep Kaur	00:02:27
2.	"Bedhadak"	Javed Ali	00:02:49

Award	Date of ceremony	Category	Recipient(s) and nominee(s)	Result	Ref.
Northeast India International Film Festival	15 December 2022	Best Film	Bal Naren	Won	
