= Coomi Kapoor =

Indian editor

Coomi Kapoor is an Indian journalist and columnist. She is currently the Contributing Editor of the Indian Express and writes a column, Inside Track with the Financial Express. In a career spanning four decades, Kapoor has remained principal correspondent, India Today, editor news, Sunday Mail, bureau chief, Indian Post, political editor, Illustrated Weekly and columnist for The Star, Malaysia.

== Early life and education ==
She studied at the Royal Institute of Science and later Boston University.

== Career ==
She started her career in 1985, with a political diary column at Motherland, a right-wing newspaper in India, and later her syndicated column was published in many newspapers. Kapoor was with the Indian Express at the time Indira Gandhi had imposed emergency in India in 1975. Kapoor has written a notable book on the Emergency called The Emergency: A Personal History. The book was a key reference for the film Emergency (2025) directed by Kangana Ranaut. Upon its release, Kapoor sent legal notices to Ranaut and the film's digital partner Netflix, accusing them of distorting historical facts and misrepresenting her work.

As of 2015, Coomi Kapoor is on the executive committee of the Editors Guild of India.

== Personal life ==
Kapoor's husband, Virendra Kapoor, is a journalist and worked with the Indian Express. During the Emergency, he was imprisoned for nine months under MISA first in Tihar Jail along with Arun Jaitley, and later shifted to Bareilly Jail. Her sister Roxna is married to BJP leader and former Cabinet Minister Subramanian Swamy.

== Works ==
- The Emergency: A Personal History, (Penguin, 2015) ISBN 0670087580
- The Tatas, Freddie Mercury & Other Bawas: An Intimate History of the Parsis, (Penguin, 2023) ISBN 0143459813
