= Tejas (film) =

2023 Indian film by Sarvesh Mewara

- Theatrical release poster
- Directed by: Sarvesh Mevara
- Written by: Sarvesh Mevara
- Produced by: Ronnie Screwvala
- Starring: Kangana Ranaut; Anshul Chauhan; Varun Mitra
- Cinematography: Hari K. Vedantam
- Edited by: Aarif Sheikh
- Music by: Shashwat Sachdev
- Production company: RSVP Movies
- Release date: 27 October 2023
- Running time: 112 minutes
- Country: India
- Language: Hindi
- Budget: ₹70 crore
- Box office: ₹6 crore

Tejas is a 2023 Indian Hindi-language action thriller film written and directed by Sarvesh Mewara and produced by Ronnie Screwvala. The film stars Kangana Ranaut in the lead role, alongside Anshul Chauhan and Varun Mitra in supporting roles.

The film was released on 27 October 2023 to mostly negative reviews from critics. Tejas emerged as one of Hindi cinema's biggest box-office disasters within its first two days of release, with most theatrical screenings being cancelled on its opening day.

== Plot ==
Tejas Gill is an officer in the Indian Air Force (IAF) who trains to become a fighter pilot after the Air Force opens combat roles to women. During her training, she forms a close relationship with a civilian singer, Ekveer. Her personal life is shattered when Ekveer and members of her family are killed in a terrorist attack in Mumbai during the 26/11 Mumbai attacks. The trauma strengthens her resolve to serve the nation and combat terrorism.

Years later, Tejas is commissioned and rises to the rank of Wing Commander. She is assigned to a frontline fighter squadron and often flies missions alongside her colleague and co-pilot Aafia. In one operation in the Andaman and Nicobar Islands, Tejas disobeys orders to rescue a fellow officer, Vivek, from a restricted zone. Although the mission is successful, her insubordination brings her under disciplinary scrutiny from her superiors.

Meanwhile, videos surface online showing an Indian national, identified as an “engineer”, being held hostage by a terrorist organisation operating in Pakistan. Tejas recognises the captive as her former coursemate Prashant, who is working undercover under the alias “Shikhar Ali”. By closely analysing the video, Tejas discovers that Prashant is covertly transmitting his location in Morse code. She deciphers the signal and determines that he is being held in Mir Ali in the North Waziristan region.

Tejas briefs the IAF leadership, including the Air Chief, and insists that the video is not merely propaganda but a coded call for help. Intelligence further reveals that the terrorist group, led by operatives Sarqalam and Khatooni, is planning a major attack in India. Tejas and Aafia are assigned to a covert cross-border operation to locate and extract Prashant, despite the political and military risks involved.

The rescue mission involves penetrating hostile airspace and evading enemy radar and surface-to-air defences. Tejas successfully reaches the target area and coordinates the extraction of Prashant, who has been severely tortured in captivity. Before being evacuated, Prashant reveals that the terrorists are planning a large-scale suicide attack on the Ram Janmabhoomi temple complex in Ayodhya.

Armed with this intelligence, Indian security agencies intensify counter-terror operations. Tejas continues the mission to neutralise the terrorist leadership behind the plot. In the ensuing confrontation, she engages enemy forces and is instrumental in eliminating Khatooni, thereby disrupting the planned attack and preventing mass civilian casualties.

The film concludes with Tejas returning safely after the successful rescue and counter-terror operation. Though still haunted by the loss she suffered during the 26/11 attacks, she reaffirms her commitment to duty as an Indian Air Force officer, symbolising the role of women in modern combat aviation and national defence.

== Cast ==
- Kangana Ranaut as Wing Commander Tejas Gill
- Anshul Chauhan as Squadron Leader Aafia
- Varun Mitra as Ekveer
- Rohed Khan as Sarqalam
- Ashish Vidyarthi as IAF Chief R K Panicker
- Vishak Nair as Prashant
- Kashyap Shangari as Vivek
- Sunit Tandon as Academy Teacher
- Rio Kapadia as RAW Chief
- Mohan Agashe as Prime Minister
- Mushtaq Kak as Khatooni
- Lovlesh Khaneja as Pakistani Pilot

== Production ==
Principal photography commenced in August 2021. Production wrapped in November 2021.

== Promotion ==
The film was endorsed by the Uttar Pradesh CM Yogi Adityanath and Uttarakhand's CM Pushkar Singh Dhami, both belonging to Bharatiya Janta Party, on 31 October 2023 after watching it in Lucknow together with Kangana Ranaut.

Ranaut remarked that Yogi Adityanath "assured us that he would protect us and our film from all our enemies and anti-national elements and motivate the nationalists to watch and connect with it". Ranaut was criticised over using politics to influence people to watch the film.

Ranaut also visited the Israeli Embassy to promote the film amid the Gaza war, which also drew criticism.

== Music ==
Tejas

Soundtrack album by Shashwat Sachdev
- Released: 6 October 2023
- Recorded: 2023
- Venues: Mumbai; Indore
- Studios: Kuhn Labs; Spectral Audio
- Genre: Feature film soundtrack
- Length: 26:22
- Language: Hindi
- Label: Zee Music Company
- Producer: Shashwat Sachdev

Shashwat Sachdev chronology
Attack: Part 1 (2022)	Tejas (2023)	Article 370 (2024)
External audio
- Tejas – Full Album on YouTube

The music of the film has been composed by Shashwat Sachdev. The lyrics have been written by Kumaar, Folk-Lore and Shashwat Sachdev.

Track listing
No.	Title	Singer(s)	Length
1.	"Dil Hai Ranjhana"	Rashmeet Kaur, Shashwat Sachdev	3:31
2.	"Jaan Da (Saiyaan Ve)"	Arijit Singh, Shashwat Sachdev	4:53
3.	"Reh Jao Na"	Hariharan, Shashwat Sachdev	4:43
4.	"Shiva (Prayer Of A Warrior)" (Lyrics by Folk-Lore)	Simran Choudhary, Shashwat Sachdev	2:37
5.	"Jaan Da (Rab Ki Dua)"	Shreya Ghoshal, Shashwat Sachdev	4:26
6.	"Ishq Hai Ranjhe Da"	Osho Jain, Shashwat Sachdev	3:59
7.	"Aag Udi (Victory Anthem)" (Lyrics by Shashwat Sachdev)	Sanjith Hegde, Shashwat Sachdev	2:13
Total length:			26:22

== Reception ==
=== Box office ===
Made on a budget of ₹70 crore (US$7.5 million), Tejas has grossed ₹4.93 crore (US$530,000) in India, with a further ₹0.67 crore (US$72,000) overseas, for a worldwide total of ₹5.6 crore (US$600,000). The film emerged as one of Hindi Cinema's biggest box-office bomb in both domestic and overseas markets within its first two days of release.

=== Critical response ===
The film received negative reviews from the critics. On the review aggregator website Rotten Tomatoes, Tejas holds a score of 10% based on 10 reviews and an average rating of 5/10.

Saibal Chatterjee of NDTV gave the film a rating of 1 out of 5 and wrote, "Tejas is a film that flies into rough weather from the word go and never manages to find a way out of it. An air combat thriller has never been so frustratingly airy-fairy". The Times of India's Dhaval Roy gave 3 out 5 stars, writing, "As the story builds up, sequences seem abrupt, and one wishes for a more cohesive screenplay. That being said, things turn thrilling once the main rescue operation begins, and the movie offers some high-octane action scenes". He praised Ranaut for performing "action as effortlessly as emotional scenes". More positive albeit mixed reviews came from Samarth Goyal of Hindustan Times who described Tejas as film that "takes you on a rollercoaster ride through the skies and geopolitics", which "succeeds in creating moments of tension and anticipation". The reviewer labelled the first half as "an unruly hunk of footage" but credited the film for regaining its composure in the second half where it keeps "maintaining a commendable tone that never veers into loud and jingoistic territory". Lachmi Deb Roy of Firstpost, who gave the film 3 out of 5 stars, appreciated Ranaut and said the film becomes interesting in the second half, but lacks appropriate depth in the research.

Anuj Kumar, reviewing for The Hindu, wrote that the movie is "a sloppy follow-up that neither works as an action film nor manages to sustain the emotional swell". Zinia Bandyopadhyaye of India Today gave the film of 2 stars out of 5 and called it a bumpy ride muddled with jarring inconsistencies. Filmfare concluded, "while Tejas is a valiant attempt towards championing inclusion of women in combat roles, the half-baked nature of the film cushions the impact of its message." Shubhra Gupta panned the film as replete with "a series of eye-roll moments" but praised Ranaut "whose acting abilities shine through even in the weakest scenes". She later included the film as one of the worst films of 2023. Jansatta described the movie in its review to be lacking plot and attempting to thrive on nationalist sentiments.
