= Stardust Award for Breakthrough Performance – Female =

Film award in India

The Stardust Breakthrough Performance Award (Female) is given as a part of the Stardust Awards, which are held annually to recognise upcoming talent in Bollywood. This award is given to the actress who has made her impact felt that particular year, by her performance thus resulting in a successful breakthrough in her career. The first award in this category was given in 2005. As of 2015, it has been changed to Stardust Award for Breakthrough Performance Supporting - Female. Here is a list of the award winners and the films for which they won. The first award in this category was given in 2005. As of 2015, it has been changed to Stardust Award for Breakthrough Supporting Performance - Female.

The winners of this award are:

Year	Actress	Film
2005	Peeya Rai Chowdhary	Bride & Prejudice
2006	Katrina Kaif	Maine Pyaar Kyun Kiya?
2007	Gul Panag	Dor
2008	Kangana Ranaut	Life In A... Metro
2009	Manjari Phadnis	Jaane Tu... Ya Jaane Na
2010	Shahana Goswami	Firaaq
2011	Amrita Puri	Aisha
2012	Poorna Jagannathan	Delhi Belly
2014	No Award	No Award
2015	Huma Qureshi	Dedh Ishqiya
2018	Meher Vij	Secret Superstar
