= Emergency (2025 film) =

2025 Indian film by Kangana Ranaut

- Theatrical release poster
- Directed by: Kangana Ranaut
- Screenplay by: Ritesh Shah
- Story by: Kangana Ranaut
- Based on: The Emergency: A Personal History by Coomi Kapoor; Priyadarshini: The Daughter of India by Jaiyanth Vasanth Sinha
- Produced by: Kangana Ranaut; Zee Studios; Renu Pitti
- Starring: Kangana Ranaut; Vishak Nair; Anupam Kher; Shreyas Talpade; Mahima Chaudhry; Milind Soman; Satish Kaushik; Darshan Pandya
- Cinematography: Tetsuo Nagata
- Edited by: Rameshwar S. Bhagat
- Music by: Songs: G. V. Prakash Kumar; Score: Sanchit Balhara and Ankit Balhara
- Production companies: Manikarnika Films; Zee Studios
- Distributed by: Zee Studios
- Release date: 17 January 2025
- Running time: 146 minutes
- Country: India
- Language: Hindi
- Budget: ₹60 crore
- Box office: ₹21.75 crore

Emergency is a 2025 Indian Hindi-language biographical drama film. It was directed and co-produced by Indian actress and politician Kangana Ranaut, based on a screenplay by Ritesh Shah and story written by Ranaut. Based on the Indian Emergency (1975–77), it stars Ranaut as former Prime Minister of India, Indira Gandhi.

Principal photography ran from July 2022 to January 2023. Originally scheduled for release on 6 September 2024, a postponement due to certification from the Central Board of Film Certification led to an official release on 17 January 2025. Emergency received mixed-to-negative reviews from film critics. The film was a box-office flop.

== Plot ==
Following India's independence, Indira Gandhi rises within the Congress Party, initially positioned as a puppet by the Syndicate. She asserts her authority by opposing their stance on Operation Searchlight and engaging with global powers, gradually consolidating control with some support from the opposition. Her decisive leadership during the 1971 Indo-Pakistan War earns her nationwide popularity. However, a 1975 verdict by the Allahabad High Court invalidates her election, prompting her to declare a national emergency, citing threats to democracy. Civil liberties are suspended, the press is censored, and opposition leaders are jailed. Her son Sanjay Gandhi gains influence during this period, implementing controversial programs such as forced sterilizations and slum demolitions. On 15 August 1975, Indira prepared to end the emergency but backs down following the assassination of Sheikh Mujibur Rahman in Bangladesh. Eventually, after consulting with philosopher J. Krishnamurti and recognizing the harm caused, she lifts the emergency in 1977 and calls for elections, which result in a defeat for the Congress and her brief arrest. Years later, during a famine, she visits a neglected village and personally promises aid, restoring her public image and leading to her political comeback. The narrative follows her personal losses, including Sanjay Gandhi's death in a plane crash, and rising unrest in Punjab under Jarnail Singh Bhindranwale. Refusing to remove her Sikh bodyguards despite warnings, she is assassinated by them on 31 October 1984. The film concludes with her final speech in Odisha, where she declares her life's purpose was not to rule India but to serve it.

== Cast ==
- Kangana Ranaut as Indira Gandhi
- Anupam Kher as Jayaprakash Narayan
- Shreyas Talpade as Atal Bihari Vajpayee
- Avijit Dutt as Jiddu Krishnamurti
- Ashok Chhabra as Morarji Desai
- Mahima Chaudhry as Pupul Jayakar, Indira Gandhi's close confidante
- Milind Soman as Field Marshal Sam Manekshaw
- Vishak Nair as Sanjay Gandhi
- Satish Kaushik as Jagjivan Ram
- Darshan Pandya as R. K. Dhawan
- Sanjay Gurbaxani as Jawaharlal Nehru
- Deepansha Dhingra as Maneka Gandhi
- Rajesh Khatri as Motilal Nehru
- Abhimanyu Vashisht as Rajiv Gandhi
- Larry Newyorker as Lieutenant General
- Richard Bhakti Klein as Henry Kissinger
- Scott Alexander Young as Richard Nixon
- Christophe Guybet as Georges Pompidou
- Adhir Bhat as Feroze Gandhi
- Kateryna Grabovska as Sonia Gandhi
- Eva Chibber as Young Priyanka Gandhi
- Samraat as Young Rahul Gandhi
- Zeba Hussain as Kamala Nehru
- Anoop Puri as Yahya Khan
- Sunny Singh as Zail Singh
- Cyrille Mansuy as Chef Napoleon
- Chandan Raj as B. D. Jatti
- Aayush Sharma as Satwant Singh
- Manish Mishra as Captain Subhash Saxena
- Asit Redij as Inder Kumar Gujral
- Balkrishna Mishra as M. F. Husain
- Rishi Kaushik as Sheikh Mujibur Rahman
- Parvez Malik as Zulfikar Ali Bhutto
- Kaasvi Kalani as Vijaya Lakshmi Pandit

== Music ==
Emergency

Soundtrack album by G. V. Prakash Kumar
- Released: 31 August 2024
- Genre: Feature film soundtrack
- Length: 18:47
- Language: Hindi
- Label: Zee Music Company
External audio
- Emergency (Audio Jukebox) on YouTube

Kangana revealed that she wanted A. R. Rahman to compose the music and background score of the film, but he refused citing that he did not want to be part of a political propaganda film. She then signed Rahman's nephew G. V. Prakash Kumar, who composed four songs and left. After G. V. Prakash Kumar's exit, one song was composed by Arko and the background score was composed by Sanchit Balhara and Ankit Balhara. Lyrics are written by Manoj Muntashir. The first single titled "Singhasan Khali Karo" was released on 26 August 2024.

No.	Title	Music	Singer(s)	Length
1.	"Singhasan Khali Karo"	G. V. Prakash Kumar	Udit Narayan, Nakash Aziz, Nakul Abhyankar	4:25
2.	"Ae Meri Jaan"	Arko	Hariharan	4:30
3.	"Shankhnaad Kar"	G. V. Prakash Kumar	Nakul Abhyankar, Neeti Mohan, Romy	3:53
4.	"Beqarariyaan"	G. V. Prakash Kumar	Monali Thakur	3:27
5.	"Sarkar Ko Salaam Hai"	G. V. Prakash Kumar	Sreerama Chandra	2:32
Total length:				18:47

== Release ==
=== Delays ===
Before its release, Emergency faced delays due to concerns raised by the Central Board of Film Certification (CBFC). The board demanded modifications to certain scenes, resulting in the postponement of the film's release. The CBFC granted a U/A certificate on the condition that the filmmakers implement specific cuts and provide factual sources for controversial historical claims depicted in the movie.

=== Theatrical ===
Initially announced to release in October–November 2023, the film was rescheduled to release on 14 June 2024. It was again postponed due to the Lok Sabha elections, scheduled to be released on 6 September 2024. On 30 August, Ranaut claimed the film was being denied a certificate by the Central Board of Film Certification, possibly due to external pressures. The Government of Telangana has also considered a ban on the film due to objections raised by the Sikh community members. On 17 October, Ranaut shared on social media that the film had been finally cleared by the CBFC, and the film was released on 17 January 2025. On 11 January 2025, the inaugural special screening of the film took place in Nagpur, India. The event was attended by Union Minister Nitin Gadkari and hosted by Kangana Ranaut and Anupam Kher.

=== Ban in Bangladesh ===
Emergency has been banned in Bangladesh due to escalating political tensions between India and Bangladesh. Officials have indicated that the decision was more related to the current diplomatic dynamics between the two nations rather than the film's content.

=== Home media ===
The film began streaming on Netflix from 17 March 2025.

== Reception ==
=== Box office ===
The film earned ₹2 crore on its opening day, aided by Cinema Lovers Day, when tickets were available at cheaper price. It made an additional ₹3 crore on the second day, and ₹3.7 crore on the third, for an opening weekend collection of ₹8.7 crore.

As of 8 February 2025, Emergency had grossed ₹19.67 crore (US$2.0 million) in India, with a further ₹2.08 crore (US$220,000) overseas, for a worldwide total of ₹21.75 crore (US$2.3 million), indicating a box-office bomb.

=== Critical response ===
On the review aggregator website Rotten Tomatoes, 30% of 10 critics' reviews are positive, with an average rating of 4.7/10.

Dhaval Roy of Times of India gave the film 2.5 stars (out of 5) and wrote, "Emergency is hindered by its overly dramatised approach and one-dimensional portrayals. The lack of narrative fluidity and context undermines the attempt to narrate an important chapter in Indian history." Saibal Chatterjee of NDTV called it a "monumental muddle" that demonstrates how not to make a biographical drama, giving the film a rating of 1.5 out of 5 and writing, "The film wades through the early years of Indira Gandhi's life pretty much in the manner that it treats the rest of it—hastily, superficially, and risibly." Shubhra Gupta of The Indian Express deemed it as a "confused" biopic that is weak in craft, giving the film 1.5 stars (out of 5) and writing, "For the most part, Emergency is more a scattershot caricature of time, place, and people, riddled with tacky computer graphics." Nandini Ramnath of Scroll deemed it as "parodic" biopic and wrote, "Ranaut's portrayal of Indira Gandhi itself raises the suspicion that the actor who has previously played iconic women leaders—the Queen of Jhansi, J. Jayalalithaa—is parodying the historical biopic this time round." Angel Rani of Deccan Herald gave the film 2 stars (out of 5) and dismissed Ranaut's portrayal of Indira Gandhi as "meek mimicry".

Deven Sharma of Filmfare gave the film three out of five, writing, "The film is well-directed by Kangana Ranaut, who, thanks to great makeup and prosthetics, looks exactly like Indira Gandhi in the first frame but later starts looking like herself." Mayank Shekhar of Mid-Day gave the film 3 stars, calling it a "pretty solid biopic of Indira Gandhi—packed with historical events, and human empathy". Lachmi Deb Roy of Firstpost gave the film three out of five, calling the film "a bold cinematic retelling of one of the most controversial periods in Indian politics". She further wrote, "Kangana Ranaut shines as a director and a craftsman. Not just Kangana, Mahima Chaudhury, Anupam Kher, Shreyas Talpade and Vishak Nair did justice to their roles in Emergency."

Rahul Desai of The Hollywood Reporter India wrote, "Emergency—which lacks both skill and self-awareness—is yet another brick in the wall of modern Bollywood." Sana Farzeen of India Today rated it 2.5 out of 5 and called it a rushed crash course on Indira Gandhi's life that struggles to delve deeply into key historical events and character motivations. Utkarsh Mishra of Rediff gave the film a rating of 1 out of 5 and panned Ranaut's portrayal, noting that her character is almost always teary-eyed and lacking in confidence with voice modulation that falls flat. Anuj Kumar of The Hindu wrote, "Marked by uneven storytelling, the biopic comes across more as a selective recreation of archival material to serve today's political narrative than a compelling take on the darkest chapter of Indian democracy." Lekha Menon of Khaleej Times gave the film 2 stars (out of 5) noting, "The film feels like a trying-to-be-a-serious school play rather than a refined, complex portrayal of power and corruption."

The film has faced significant backlash from Sikh organizations, particularly the Shiromani Gurdwara Parbandhak Committee (SGPC), which accuses it of distorting historical events related to the 1984 anti-Sikh riots and defaming the Sikh community. In response to these protests, several theaters in the Indian state of Punjab chose not to screen the film. Internationally, the film faced protests in the United Kingdom, where Sikh groups organized demonstrations against Emergency, disrupting its screening at some cinemas during its opening weekend. The Sikh Press Association stated that the film was seen as anti-Sikh, leading to canceled screenings in cities such as Birmingham and Wolverhampton.

== Awards and nominations ==
Year (Note: Refers to the year in which the ceremony was held.)	Award	Category	Work	Result	Ref(s)
2026	Zee Cine Award	Best Actor – Female	Emergency	Nominated

== Legal disputes ==
In April 2025, journalist and author Coomi Kapoor filed a lawsuit against Ranaut's Manikarnika Films Pvt Ltd and Netflix, alleging breach of contract and defamation. Kapoor claimed that the film inaccurately portrayed historical events and misrepresented her 2015 book, The Emergency: A Personal History, despite a contractual agreement that stipulated adherence to historical facts and prohibited the use of her name and book for promotional purposes without consent. Kapoor stated that her attempts to address these issues directly with the producers were unsuccessful, leading to legal action.

== See also ==
- Cultural depictions of Indira Gandhi
- Works about the Emergency (India)
