= Panga (film) =

2020 Indian film by Ashwiny Iyer Tiwari

- Theatrical release poster
- Directed by: Ashwiny Iyer Tiwari
- Written by: Nikhil Mehrohtra; Ashwiny Iyer Tiwari
- Screenplay by: Nitesh Tiwari
- Produced by: Fox Star Studios
- Starring: Kangana Ranaut; Jassi Gill; Yagya Bhasin; Richa Chadda; Neena Gupta
- Cinematography: Jay I. Patel
- Edited by: Ballu Saluja
- Music by: Songs: Shankar-Ehsaan-Loy; Score: Sanchit Balhara and Ankit Balhara
- Production company: Fox Star Studios
- Distributed by: Fox Star Studios
- Release date: 24 January 2020
- Running time: 131 minutes
- Country: India
- Language: Hindi
- Budget: ₹49 crore
- Box office: ₹41.71 crore

Panga (transl. Clash) is a 2020 Indian Hindi-language sports drama film written and directed by Ashwiny Iyer Tiwari from a screenplay by Nitesh Tiwari. Produced and distributed by Fox Star Studios, the film stars Kangana Ranaut as the main protagonist with Jassie Gill, Yagya Bhasin, Neena Gupta and Richa Chadha in pivotal roles.

Shot largely in Panaji, Bhopal, Mumbai and Kolkata, the film was released in India on 24 January 2020.

The film and Ranaut's performance received widespread critical acclaim. Several publications like Paste, Cosmopolitan, and Times of India cited Panga as one of the best films of the year 2020. Marie Claire named it as one of the best Bollywood films of all time. In its theatrical run, Panga grossed ₹41.71 crore globally, emerging as the tenth highest-grossing film of the year. For her performance in Panga, Ranaut won the National Film Award for Best Actress at the 67th National Film Awards. This was Ranaut's third win in this best actress category and overall her fourth National Film Award.

== Summary ==
Rooted in the subculture of societal facts, Panga is an emotional roller coaster tale of a middle-class Indian woman, where a forgotten Kabaddi world champion catalyzes an inner desire to give a new meaning to her existing role as a wife and mother and takes an ingenious decision to come back to the sport despite the challenges of age stereotypes and new generation complexities which creates an upheaval in her life as she is torn between societal pressures of family responsibility and love for the sport.

== Plot ==
Jaya Nigam is a middle-class family reservation counter clerk and former Kabaddi champion living with her husband Prashant Sachdeva, a railway section engineer, and 7-year-old son Aditya "Adi" Sachdeva, in Bhopal. Despite the support of both Prashant and Adi, she regrets having to quit the sport after Adi's birth. Learning of her achievements through Prashant, Adi pushes her to return to the sport despite facing challenges of physical fitness and newer, more experienced players, while her friend, former teammate, and Kabaddi coach Meenal "Meenu" Singh, helps her with the training. Initially unable to deal with the pressures of a hectic job and the exercise routines that Adi's enthusiasm pushes her through, she finally regains composure and, with support from Prashant and Adi, goes on to mark her comeback to the sport as a mother of a 7-year-old after her story gets noticed again.

== Cast ==
- Kangana Ranaut as Jaya Nigam, a kabaddi player
- Jassi Gill as Prashant Sachdeva, Jaya's husband, a railways section engineer
- Richa Chadda as Meenal "Meenu" Singh, Jaya's best friend, former teammate, and a kabaddi coach
- Neena Gupta as Rachna Nigam, Jaya's mother, Prashant's mother-in-law, and Adi's maternal grandmother
- Yagya Bhasin as Aditya "Adi" Sachdeva, Jaya's and Prashant's son
- Megha Burman as Nisha Das, Jaya's present teammate
- Rajesh Tailang as Mr. Sinha, Indian National Coach
- Smita Tambe as Gauri, Indian team captain
- Lavish Anil Jain in an uncredited cameo appearance
- Manoj Jadhav as selection executive
- Piyush Seetha as Piyush, Jaya's assistant boy

== Production ==
=== Development ===
Panga was announced on 21 August 2018 with Ashwiny Iyer Tiwari sharing an emotional Instagram video montage of herself, Kangana Ranaut, Jassi Gill, Neena Gupta and their families, indicating that "when your kin stands behind you, no one in the world can take ‘panga’ with you". Ranaut told the Mumbai Mirror in an interview: “When Ashwiny narrated the film's story, I was completely moved. My family has been my pillar of strength and has always stood by me through thick and thin. I could really relate to the emotions of the film. Plus, Ashwiny is known for her slice-of-life films and I loved her recent work in Bareilly Ki Barfi. Panga is even more special for me as, for the first time, I will be playing the role of a national-level kabaddi player. That's going to be challenging for sure! I am looking forward to some exciting times with Ashwiny and the Fox Star team.”

Gill, who is playing the role of Ranaut's husband in this film told the Mumbai Mirror: “I loved the script, especially the inspiring family angle. The film is a roller-coaster of emotions but to me the real Indian family feeling was the most heart-warming part of the subject. Since I come from a very close-knit family, I could identify with the story.”

=== Training ===
The actors appearing in the film as kabaddi players, including Ranaut, underwent training in kabaddi for over two months.

=== Filming ===
Filming began on 23 March 2017 in Panaji. The first schedule of the film was wrapped up on 7 December 2018. The second schedule of the film was wrapped up on 22 June 2019. The director planned next schedule in a Delhi stadium in April. The third schedule of shooting began in April 2019 in Delhi. The Delhi schedule of the film was completed in mid April and next schedule of shooting to begin in Kolkata. The filming was completed in mid July 2019. Ashwiny Iyer Tiwari, the director of the film wrote on her Instagram account, "My dearest Panga Humans are the sun. The sun that spread a ray of hope when things seem really impossible to achieve."

== Marketing and release ==
First look of the film was shared by the director of the film Ashwiny Iyer Tiwari on 7 March 2019, a still photo in which leading pair is laughing while looking at the sunset.

The first look poster of Ranaut was released on 19 December 2019.

The film was released in India on 24 January 2020.

== Soundtrack ==
Panga

Soundtrack album by Shankar–Ehsaan–Loy
- Released: 21 January 2020
- Recorded: 2018–2019
- Genre: Feature film soundtrack
- Length: 23:55
- Language: Hindi
- Label: Saregama
- Producers: Shankar–Ehsaan–Loy, Meghdeep Bose

Shankar–Ehsaan–Loy chronology
Chhapaak (2020)	Panga (2020)	Bandish Bandits (2020)
External audio
- Official Audio Jukebox on YouTube

The film's music is composed by Shankar–Ehsaan–Loy while lyrics are written by Javed Akhtar.

Track listing
No.	Title	Singer(s)	Length
1.	"Panga - Title Track"	Harshdeep Kaur, Divya Kumar, Siddharth Mahadevan	3:19
2.	"Dil Ne Kaha"	Shahid Mallya, Asees Kaur	4:46
3.	"Jugnu"	Sunny Hindustani, Shankar Mahadevan	4:40
4.	"Bibby Song"	Annu Kapoor, Sherry	2:50
5.	"Wahi Hai Raste"	Mohan Kannan, Asees Kaur	4:28
6.	"Dil Ne Kaha" (Reprise)	Jassi Gill, Asees Kaur	3:52
Total length:			23:55

== Box office ==
Panga earned only ₹2.70 crore at the domestic box office on its opening day. On the second day, the film collected ₹5.61 crore. On the third day, the film collected ₹6.60 crore, taking total opening weekend collection to ₹14.91 crore.

As of 28 February 2020, with a gross of ₹4.43 crore in India and ₹7.28 crore overseas, the film has a worldwide gross collection of ₹11.71 crore. In its complete theatrical run, Panga grossed a total of ₹41.71 crore globally, emerging as the tenth highest-grossing film of the year 2020.

== Critical reception ==
Upon release, Panga received widespread critical acclaim from the film critics, who praised Ranaut's performance and the message of the film. On review aggregator website Rotten Tomatoes, the film holds an approval rating of 94% based on 17 reviews, with an average rating of 6.9/10.

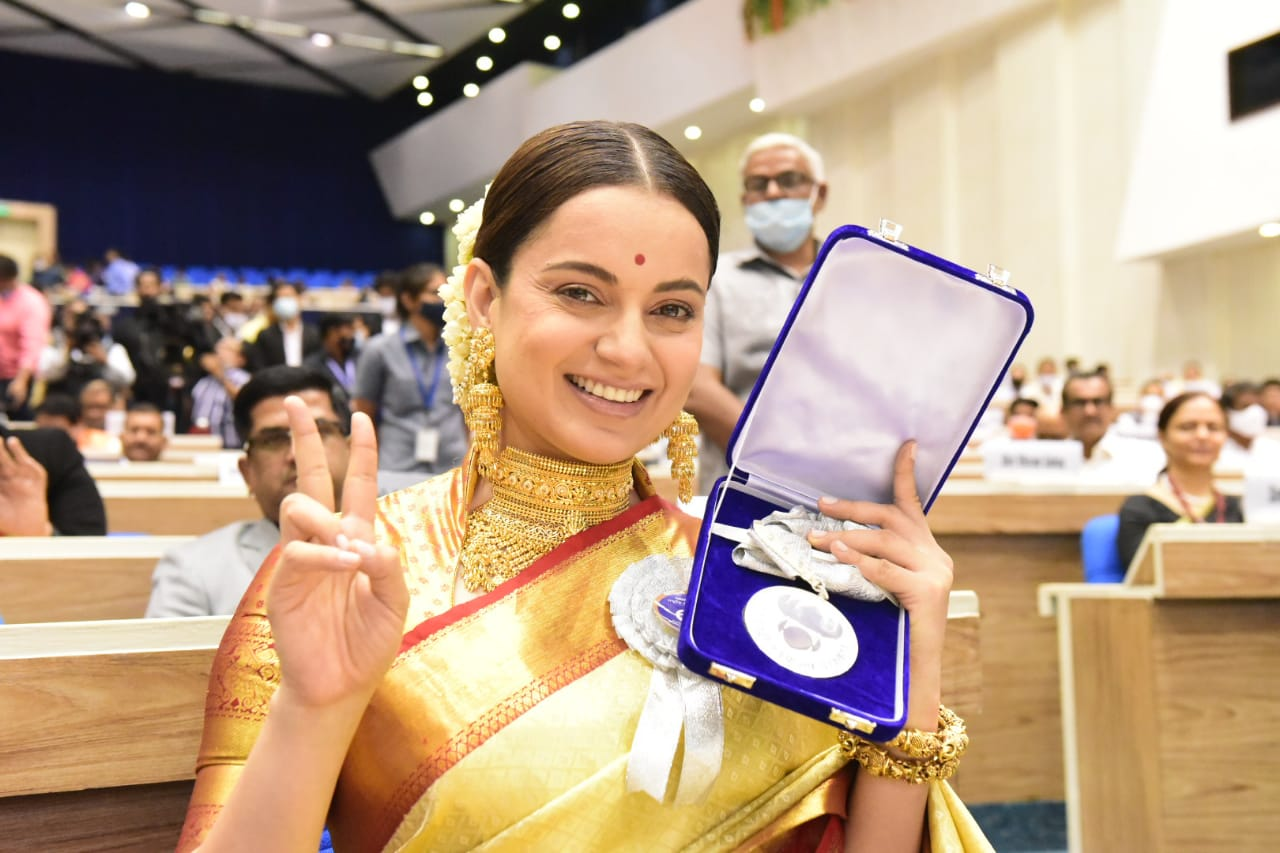
Kangana Ranaut's performance in Panga garnered widespread critical acclaim winning her the National Film Award for Best Actress in 2021.

=== India ===
Anupama Chopra of Film Companion wrote, ‘‘Panga works on the strength of its performances and its writing’’. Praising Ranaut's performance she further wrote, ‘‘Kangana Ranaut plays Jaya with skill, sensitivity and nuance, this is a terrific actor at the top of her game’’. Namrata Joshi of The Hindu wrote, ‘‘Panga is about how love, marriage and children need not come in the way of a sportswoman’s success, but what sets it refreshingly apart is a wonderful sense of humour’’. Praising Ranaut's performance she further wrote, ‘‘Ranaut brings in the right amount of vulnerability, lack of sureness, yet a determination and cussedness to the character; Ranaut even works on a distinct body language for each of the phases, transforming without making it obvious’’. Rajeev Masand of CNN-IBN gave the film a rating of 3.5/5 and wrote, ‘‘Panga is an endlessly optimistic film which fills you with hope and warmth’’. Praising Ranaut's performance he further wrote, ‘‘Kangana Ranaut is extraordinary as Jaya. There isn't one false note in her beautiful, lived-in portrayal of a selfless wife and mother ’’. Saibal Chatterjee of NDTV gave the film a rating of 3.5/5. Calling it a ‘‘not-to-be-missed gem’’ he stated, ‘‘Panga is a tale that does not sacrifice authenticity for flashy plot sleights or thrills of a superficial nature’’. Praising Ranaut's performance he further stated, ‘‘The role fits Kangana Ranaut to absolute perfection and there isn't a single false note in her performance’’. Shubhra Gupta of The Indian Express gave the film a rating of 3/5 and wrote, ‘‘Jaya Nigam, played with absolute conviction by Kangana Ranuat, dares to dream of a past life where she was in the spotlight, is a straight-off win, subject-wise’’. The Economic Times gave the film a rating of 4/5 and called it an ode to ‘‘motherhood’’ and ‘‘dreams’’. Praising Ranaut's performance they wrote, ‘‘Ranaut is the star of the show; She breathes vulnerability and power in equal measure’’.

Sreeparna Sengupta of The Times of India gave the film a rating of 4/5 and wrote, ‘‘Panga is an exhilarating ode to motherhood and chasing dreams’’. Calling Ranaut the ‘‘tour de force’’ of the film she further stated, ‘‘Kangana Ranaut as Jaya is terrific and the tour de force of the film – at home she is the gentle, dutiful Jaya who is simmering with this latent desire to break out and catch up with her dreams. And when she is on the court Kangana thrills with an absolutely throbbing, pulsating performance. She breathes in vulnerability and power – switching between the two facets of her character so swiftly and seamlessly that it is totally fascinating’’. Stutee Ghosh of The Quint gave the film a rating of 4/5. Calling Ranaut's performance ‘‘terrific’’ and ‘‘nuanced’’ she stated, ‘‘Panga isn't limited to a tussle in a kabaddi match, though those sequences are brilliantly shot, it's about not letting life get the better of you; even at the end it isn't a carefully curated victory lap that the film offers’’. Pramit Chatterjee of Mashable India gave the film a rating of 4/5 and wrote, ‘‘Panga is more than just a sports film about female empowerment; it is an intimate look into why women should follow their dream, even if they had to adhere to social norms, and how everyone else around them should look beyond their selfish needs and whole-heartedly support them’’. Calling Ranaut's performance in Panga her career-best he further wrote, ‘‘Every time the camera is on her, you can see how many thoughts and emotions that are running through her mind and she does it so effortlessly; neither does she overdoes [sic] and nor does she underdoes [sic] it, she is perfect as Jaya Nigam, thereby making one of the best fictional characters’’.

Nairita Mukherjee of India Today gave the film a rating of 3.5/5 and wrote, ‘‘Panga is a good reminder that we all matter, individually, in our own way, in our own stories. It's a reminder to hold on to that little ball of confidence in you. And it's a reminder that Kangana doesn't need to actually take panga, she can simply make one’’. Nandini Ramnath of Scroll gave the film a rating of 3.5/5 and praised the performances of Ranaut, Gill and supporting cast by writing, ‘‘Kangana Ranaut imbues her character with tenderness and sweetness. Though it's hard to steal the show from Ranaut, Jassie Gill stages his own little personal coup in Panga. He is marvellous as the supportive, if one-note, spouse, and is especially sharp in the scenes with his son and mother-in-law’’. Monika Rawal Kukreja of Hindustan Times described Panga as a ‘‘emotional roller-coaster’’ and wrote, ‘‘Panga is an honest, relatable film that will stay with you long after you leave the theatre’’ and ‘‘A sincere ode to motherhood and those countless sacrifices that a woman – as a mother and a wife -- makes for her family’’. Praising Ranaut's performance she further wrote, ‘‘Kangana is in her element and once again proves why she's a star who doesn't belong to any league of actors, but has a niche of her own; she lets you connect with Jaya in whatever she does, the way she speaks, dresses, cries, laughs, goes to work, takes care of her family and amid all this, wants to be happy for herself’’. Subhash K Jha of The National Herald wrote, ‘‘Panga really needs no prompting to be loved, you surrender to its affectionate homage to the housewife’s revived dreams wholeheartedly’’. Praising Ranaut's performance he further wrote, ‘‘Standing tall in her role of smothered aspirations is Kangana Ranaut expressing so much of her character’s yearnings, fears and insecurities through her eyes, you wish she would just stop talking’’.

=== Overseas ===
Rachel Saltz from The New York Times wrote, ‘‘Panga has an understated realism — about the tempos of family life and the Indian middle class, the drama, too, is understated: bumps in a road paved with good will rather than a clash of values and goals’’. Praising Ranaut's performance she further wrote, ‘‘Ranaut as Jaya elevates the movie, putting the story across better than the script can. Ranaut makes Jaya credible and specific; she’s not an every woman or every mom or every athlete. She’s this one, Jaya, and Ranaut makes you care about what kind of place she can find for herself in the world’’. Aparita Bhandari from The Globe and Mail gave the film a rating of 3/4 and wrote, ‘‘Panga's strength lies in its capable cast, which brings heart to a largely contrived script that tells more than it shows’’. Praising Ranaut's performance she further wrote, ‘‘As Jaya, Ranaut brings a vulnerability to a character who is filled with self-doubt, understands the ways in which society characterizes a mother chasing her own ambitions as selfish and cruel, and knows her limits’’. Ambica Sachin of Khaleej Times gave the film a rating of 3.5/5 and wrote, ‘‘Panga is an endearing and inspiring tale of a woman's attempt to reclaim her identity in a world that is content to relegate her as simply a wife and a mother; Watch Panga if you enjoy slice-of-life movies with a dash of everyday humour thrown in’’. Praising Ranaut's performance she further wrote, ‘‘Kangana is as usual a delight to watch; She inhabits her character so thoroughly that the actress in her totally disappears and it's as if we are watching Jaya on screen’’. Ankur Pathak of HuffPost wrote, ‘‘Panga is a quiet triumph, a film that gently explores the guilt women feel and are made to feel for pursuing their dreams and why they should do it nonetheless’’. Praising Ranaut's performance he further wrote, ‘‘Ranaut delivers a measured, restrained performance with occasional bursts of joy and anger, she anchors the film with a solid turn’’.

=== Year-end lists ===
Several publications like Paste, Cosmopolitan, The Times of India, The National, and Forbes India (Kunal Purandare's picks) named Panga as one of the best movies of 2020. Ananya Ghosh of CNN-IBN listed Ranaut's character in the film, Jaya Nigam, as one of the seven best women characters in Hindi films of 2020. Ineye Komonibo of Marie Claire named Panga as one of the 38 best Bollywood movies of all-time.

== Accolades ==
Year (Note: Refers to the year in which the ceremony was held.)	Award	Category	Recipient	Result	Ref.
2021	National Film Awards	Best Actress	Kangana Ranaut	Won (Note: Also for Manikarnika: The Queen of Jhansi.)	
2021	Filmfare Awards	Best Actress	Kangana Ranaut	Nominated	
2021	Filmfare Awards	Best Supporting Actress	Richa Chadda	Nominated	
2021	Filmfare Awards	Best Cinematography	Archit Patel, Jay I. Patel	Nominated	
2021	Filmfare Awards	Best Production Design	Sandeep Meher	Nominated	
