= Manikarnika: The Queen of Jhansi =

2019 Indian Hindi film

- Theatrical release poster
- Directed by: Krish Jagarlamudi; Kangana Ranaut
- Screenplay by: V. Vijayendra Prasad
- Dialogues by: Sunish Tom
- Story by: V. Vijayendra Prasad
- Produced by: Zee Studios; Kamal Jain; Abhishek Vyas
- Starring: Kangana Ranaut; Jisshu Sengupta; Mohammed Zeeshan Ayyub; Danny Denzongpa; Ankita Lokhande
- Narrated by: Amitabh Bachchan
- Cinematography: Kiran Deohans; Gnana Shekar V. S.
- Edited by: Rameshwar S. Bhagat; Suraj Jagtap
- Music by: Songs: Shankar–Ehsaan–Loy; Score: Sanchit Balhara and Ankit Balhara
- Production companies: Zee Studios; Kairos Kontent Studios
- Distributed by: Zee Studios
- Release date: 25 January 2019
- Running time: 150 minutes
- Country: India
- Language: Hindi
- Budget: ₹99–125 crore
- Box office: est. ₹132.95 crore

Manikarnika: The Queen of Jhansi is a 2019 Indian Hindi-language epic historical drama film based on the life of Rani Lakshmi Bai of Jhansi. It is directed by Krish Jagarlamudi and Kangana Ranaut from a screenplay written by V. Vijayendra Prasad. Produced by Zee Studios, the film stars Ranaut in the title role.

Manikarnika: The Queen of Jhansi was released on 3700 screens in 50 countries worldwide on 25 January 2019. The film performed moderately well internationally and in India in its theatrical run. The film holds the record for the highest opening weekend collections for a female-driven film in India. The film also became the highest Indian opener in Japan in January 2020. It is one of the highest grossing women-centric films in India.

The film opened to a positive critical response. It was selected for the Bucheon International Fantastic Film Festival. Ranaut's portrayal of Rani Lakshmi Bai garnered widespread critical acclaim winning her the National Film Award for Best Actress at the 67th National Film Awards.

== Plot ==
In 1828, Manikarnika is born in the ghats of Varanasi. She is raised by her father, Moropanth, and Peshwa Bajirao II in Bithoor. She is a favourite of the Peshwa, and he has brought her up with a lot of love. One day, Dixit Ji of Jhansi spots her facing a ferocious tiger fearlessly. Impressed, he asks the Peshwa for her hand in marriage to the Maharaja of the Maratha-ruled princely state of Jhansi, Gangadhar Rao. Dixit Ji is aware that the British are eyeing Jhansi and want to annex the kingdom. He realises that her brave persona would play a crucial role in giving a tough fight to the British. The marriage takes place, and as per the tradition, the king gives her a new name – 'Lakshmi Bai'. All these developments upset Gangadhar's brother Sadashiv Rao. He is friendly with the British and wants to usurp the throne.

Laxmibai, after a few years, gives birth to Damodar, and she is unable to contain her happiness. Her joy, however, is short-lived as Sadashiv surreptitiously poisons Damodar. Gangadhar, at the same time, falls ill too. Knowing that his death is near, he and Laxmibai decide to adopt a son who will rule Jhansi in the future. Much to Sadashiv's dismay, his son is not adopted, and instead, ‘Anand Rao’, the son of a courtier, is named the heir. He was renamed as Laxmibai instinctively calls him Damodar Rao. Gangadhar passes away, and the British attempt to annex the throne. However, Laxmibai surprises everyone as she decides to take over the reins. She proclaims herself as the queen of Jhansi and challenges the British openly. When the British force her to vacate the palace, she walks gracefully into the village and is welcomed and greeted by a massive parade of villagers led by Jhalkaribai. She continues to live among the civilians quietly strategizing to reclaim the throne. The rebellions from the Indian Rebellion of 1857 reach Jhansi, where the revolutionaries led by Sangram Singh kill General Gordon and his officers. They further attempt to kill their children and wives, but their attempts are thwarted by Laxmibai. She plans to regain the throne of Jhansi while Sangram Singh and his men join the rebellion in Delhi. The East India Company requests the British government to appoint Sir Hugh Rose to salvage the situation and remove Laxmibai from the throne permanently.

Knowing very well that she will soon be attacked again, Laxmibai begins training her own army, especially women, to fight. Laxmibai assembles an army of 20,000 troops, and Pathans join her later in 1858. During the siege of Jhansi, Laxmibai valiantly steps onto the battlefield to destroy the British cannons strategically placed in front of a temple. The strong fort walls keep Laxmibai and her army steady until Sadashiv Rao divulges secrets about the fort to the British, who finally break the siege and manage to storm the keep, resulting in the death of ‘Gaus-Baba’. Jhalkaribai, despite discovering that she is pregnant, acts as a decoy pretending to be the queen due to her striking resemblance to Laxmibai. She manages to distract the British army so that Laxmibai and Damodar can escape the castle safely. Jhalkaribai sacrifices herself in a major gunpowder explosion, killing numerous British officers along with her.

Laxmibai escapes to Kalpi to reunite with Tatya Tope and other allies. She captures the princely state of Gwalior and motivates the troops to participate in the war. With a heavy heart, Laxmibai leaves Damodar and leads an attack on the British. Laxmibai bravely sets out to attack the huge British army even though she faces a certain defeat. Laxmibai gets shot by one of the British soldiers, and while taking her last breath, she looks at Hugh Rose and immolates herself in a fire to avoid being captured and humiliated by the British. After Laxmibai's death, Jhansi was surrendered to the British Government in 1860 on behalf of Damodar Rao. Damodar Rao survived but lived a life suffering from prolonged illness and dire poverty, dying at the age of 58 in 1903. General Hugh Rose wrote about Rani Laxmibai's bravery and courage in his autobiography that "She was the most dangerous of all rebel leaders, best and bravest of all, the only man among mutineers".

== Cast ==
- Kangana Ranaut as Rani Lakshmi Bai (Manikarnika "Manu")
- Jisshu Sengupta as Gangadhar Rao, Laxmibai's husband
- Atul Kulkarni as Tatya Tope
- Mohammed Zeeshan Ayyub as Sadashiv Rao, Lakshmibai's brother-in-law
- Danny Denzongpa as Ghulam Ghaus Khan
- Richard Keep as General Hugh Rose
- Suresh Oberoi as Baji Rao II
- Anil George as Pir Ali
- Edward Sonnenblick as Captain Gordon
- Vaibhav Tatwawadi as Puran Singh
- Ankita Lokhande as Jhalkaribai
- Yash Tonk as Rao Tula Ram
- R. Bhakti Klein as Lord Canning
- Katelyn Rodrigues as Little Manikarnika
- Mishti Chakraborty as KashiBai
- Priya Gamre as Sundar
- Unnati Davara as Mundar
- Suparna Marwah as Rajamata
- Ravi Prakash as Scindia King of Gwalior
- Ravi Pandey as Bakshish Ali
- Rajiv Kachroo as Gul Mohamad
- Nihar Pandya as Rao Saheb Peshwa
- Taher Shabbir as Sangram Singh (as Tahir Mithaiwala)
- Kulbhushan Kharbanda as Dixit Ji
- Manish Wadhwa as Moropant
- Nalneesh Neel as Teer Singh
- Vikram Kochhar

== Production ==
The outdoor locations of the film were Jaipur, Jodhpur, Alsisar (Jhunjhunu) & Bikaner in Rajasthan and Narmada Ghat, Ahilya Fort in Madhya Pradesh. Besides these, the film was shot at studios in Hyderabad and Mumbai.

Sukant Panigrahy, Sriram Iyengar, and Sujeet Sawant were hired as the production designers of the film. Sujeet and Sriram have also done production designing for Bajirao Mastani (2015).

Principal photography was completed in October 2018. By that time, only 10 days of filming work remained. Krish intended to do that minimal patchwork and then move on to direct N. T. R.. However, Sonu Sood was replaced by Mohammed Zeeshan Ayyub, forcing the team to reshoot all of Sood's scenes. As Krish was busy directing N. T. R., Ranaut took over, making her directorial debut. Both Krish and Ranaut received joint directorial credit.

== Soundtrack ==
Manikarnika: The Queen of Jhansi

Soundtrack album by Shankar–Ehsaan–Loy
- Released: 9 January 2019
- Recorded: 2018
- Genre: Feature Film Soundtrack
- Length: 31:37
- Language: Hindi
- Label: Zee Music Company
External audio
- Audio Jukebox(Hindi) on YouTube

Shankar–Ehsaan–Loy chronology
Soorma (2018)	Manikarnika: The Queen of Jhansi (2019)	Mere Pyare Prime Minister (2019)

The film's soundtrack is composed by Shankar–Ehsaan–Loy and lyrics written by Prasoon Joshi. The film's score was composed by Sanchit Balhara and Ankit Balhara.

Hindi Track listing

Track listing
No.	Title	Singer(s)	Length
1.	"Bharat"	Shankar Mahadevan	4:00
2.	"Vijayi Bhava"	Shankar Mahadevan	4:23
3.	"Bolo Kab Pratikar Karoge"	Sukhwinder Singh	3:16
4.	"Rajaji"	Pratibha Singh Baghel, Ravi Mishra	5:17
5.	"Shiva Tandava Stotram (Sanskrit hymn to Shiva)"	Shankar Mahadevan	2:45
6.	"Tak Taki"	Pratibha Singh Baghel	4:17
7.	"Dankila"	Prajakta Shukre, Shrinidhi Ghatate, Siddharth Mahadevan, Arunaja, Chotu Singh Rawna, Hemant Brijwasi	3:44
8.	"Bharat" (ft Prasoon Joshi)	Shankar Mahadevan, Prasoon Joshi	3:56
Total length:			31:37

Tamil Track listing

All lyrics are written by Madhan Karky.

Tamil Track listing
No.	Title	Singer(s)	Length
1.	"Jayam Unadhae"	Shankar Mahadevan	4:24
2.	"Sivam Sivam"	Renjith Unni, Jithin Raj, Shenbagaraj, Narayanan, Vignesh Narayan	2:46
3.	"Bhaaradham"	Shankar Mahadevan, Hamsika Iyer	3:52
4.	"Koamaanae"	Mahalakshmi Iyer, Shriram Iyer	5:18
5.	"Kannaa Vaa"	Hamsika Iyer	4:18
6.	"Nanjukku"	Mahalakshmi Iyer, Siddharth Mahadevan and Hamsika Iyer	3:45
7.	"Sollaay"	Shriram Iyer	3:17
Total length:			27:47

Telugu Track listing

All lyrics are written by Chaitanya Prasad.

No.	Title	Singer(s)	Length
1.	"Raa Kannaa"	Hamsika Iyer	4:26
2.	"Bharath Vardhillaali"	Shankar Mahadevan, Hamsika Iyer	4:00
3.	"Vijayibhava"	Shankar Mahadevan	4:24
4.	"Cheppara Nee Prathikaaram Epudo"	Shriram Iyer	3:17
5.	"Naa Raja"	Mahalaksmi Iyer & Shriram Iyer	4:10
6.	"Shiv Tandav"	Shankar Mahadevan	2:45
7.	"Rae...Raelaa Rae..."	Mahalakshmi Iyer, Hamsika Iyer & Siddharth Mahadevan	3:45
Total length:			27:42

== Marketing ==
The first poster was released on 15 August 2018. Theatrical posters of the film were released in 2 languages for simultaneous release of the film in Tamil and Telugu with Hindi version on 4 January 2019.

Its official music launch took place on 9 January. The song video from Manikarnika: The Queen of Jhansi titled "Vijayi Bhava" was made available for public viewing on the same day. Short video teasers of dialogues and prominent scenes of the film were posted on the Facebook page of Zee Studios for viewers.

== Release ==
The film is certified U/A (Parental Guidance for children below the age of 12 years) by CBFC of India, and the film was released on 25 January 2019. Its runtime is 148 minutes. Manikarnika: The Queen of Jhansi was released on 3700 screens in 50 countries worldwide in Hindi, Tamil and Telugu on 25 January 2019. While the original was in Hindi, the Tamil and the Telugu versions were dubbed from the Hindi version.

A special screening of the film was organised by Zee Entertainment for Ram Nath Kovind, the President of India, at Rashtrapati Bhavan Cultural Centre on 18 January in the presence of Kangana Ranaut and her team before the release of the film on 25 January 2019. After watching the film, the President felicitated the cast and crew of the film.

The film was selected for the Bucheon International Fantastic Film Festival. The film was also screened at the Kashi Indian International Film Festival, Itanagar International Film Festival, and at the Indian embassy, Lebanon under Azadi Ka Amrit Mahotsav event.

== Critical reception ==
Manikarnika: The Queen of Jhansi received mixed reviews from critics, who criticised the film's length; however, Ranaut's performance received widespread critical acclaim. On the review aggregator website Rotten Tomatoes, 45% of 11 critics' reviews are positive, with an average rating of 5.2/10.

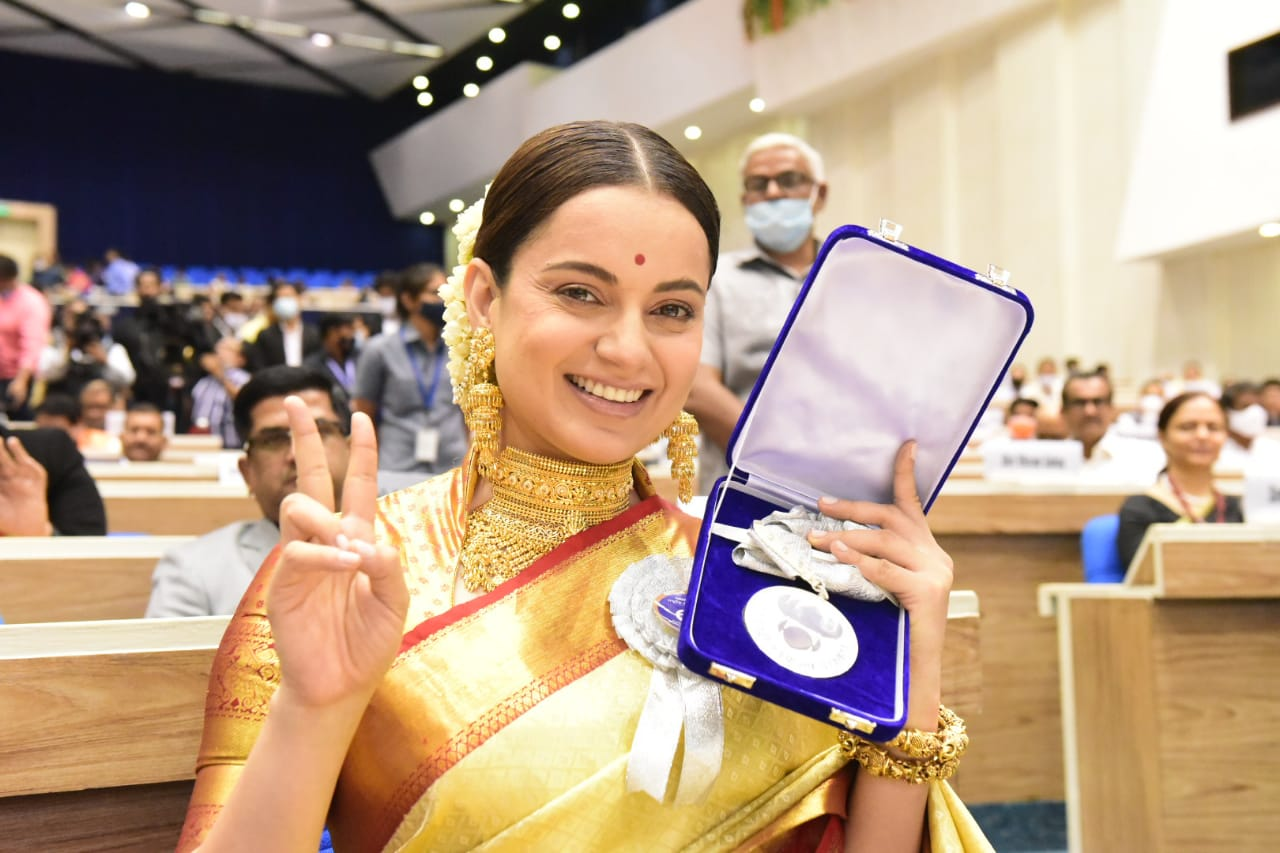
Ranaut's performance garnered widespread critical acclaim winning her the National Film Award for Best Actress at the 67th National Film Awards.

=== India ===
Anupama Chopra of Film Companion gave the film a rating of 3/5 and stated, "Manikarnika reveals Ranaut as an artist with boundless ambition". Calling Ranaut's performance in the film "fiery," she wrote, "Ranaut is on fire as the iconic Rani Lakshmi Bai. Her spine is erect, her eyes are unblinking, and she seems propelled by some otherworldly power. She’s riding horses, wielding swords, leaping on elephants, and making it all look plausible. When she looks into the camera and insists on dying for the country, you want to follow her into battle". Rajeev Masand of CNN-IBN gave the film a rating of 3/5 and wrote, "This is a deliberately simplistic film; an old-fashioned patriotic saga told in the broadest of strokes, and with full nationalist fervor". Praising Ranaut's performance, he further wrote, "Ranaut’s extraordinary performance is the film’s biggest strength. She is unwavering in her portrayal of Rani Lakshmibai; There’s a hard-to-miss intensity in her eyes, and tenacity in her voice. She commands the screen with a fiery, arresting presence, never letting your attention wander away from her". Namrata Joshi of The Hindu wrote, "Ranaut doesn’t just share the director’s credit; she overshadows all of the cast, including veterans like Danny Denzongpa and consummate performers like Atul Kulkarni and Mohammad Zeeshan Ayub. It’s evident that Ranaut has put her all into the film and she's present in practically every frame". Raja Sen of Hindustan Times gave the film a rating of 3/5 and wrote, "Ranaut’s film is an arrow against cinema’s patriarchy, a broadside against the boys". He called Ranaut a "one-woman army" and praised her performance by writing, "Ranaut is glorious, and she makes you believe it. She wears a dazzling smile like a cloak of confidence, and slices down enemy soldiers with a fury. We know what this actress is capable of, and she gives even the weaker written parts of this film her all".

Shibaji Roychoudhury of Times Now gave the film a rating of 4/5 and wrote, "Manikarnika has many moments of genius and enough fire to keep you glued to the screen. Ranaut's performance as the iconic Rani of Jhansi is worth every penny spent". Praising Ranaut's performance he further wrote, "Ranaut’s portrayal of one of the most iconic women in Indian history is certainly praise-worthy. Her nuanced grasp of the rebel warrior-queen will certainly win you over". Meena Iyer of DNA gave the film a rating of 4/5 and wrote, "Ranaut, who wears two hats that of the protagonist and the co-director displays a certain maturity on both counts. As a queen, she displays steely resolve, managing to infuse life into her Laxmibai; As a director, she shares credit with Krish and has assuredly contributed to this big-ticket outing". A. Ganesh Nadar of Rediff gave the film a rating of 4/5 and wrote, "The film is as grand as the Baahubali films. Unsurprisingly, as both films have been written by the same writer, K. V. Vijayendra Prasad". Bollywood Hungama gave the film a rating of 3.5/5 and wrote, "Manikarnika is a well-made historical with the right scale, emotional quotient and battle sequences as its highpoint. Also, Kangana Ranaut's performance is the icing on the cake". Praising Ranaut's performance, they further wrote, "Ranaut delivers a terrific performance and owns this challenging character. The Rani of Jhansi has a lot of significance, and the actress ensures she does complete justice to it. In the action scenes, she is great, but watch out for her performances in the emotional sequences as well". The Economic Times gave the film a rating of 3.5/5 and wrote, "Manikarnika is a larger-than-life period drama doesn’t need a man to pack a punch". Praising Ranaut's performance, they wrote, "Ranaut’s stellar screen presence brings Manikarnika to life. It highlights her prowess as a prolific actor and adds one more feather to her cap. Her transformation from a young girl to a warrior soaked in blood is effortless".

Ronak Kotecha of Times of India gave the film a rating of 3.5/5 and wrote, "Manikarnika is a well-made film that highlights Ranaut's prowess as an actor. For a first-time filmmaker, she undoubtedly shows spark and potential as a storyteller. Short of an epic, this larger-than-life war drama has enough valour and spirit to keep you engaged in these pages of history." Praising Ranaut's performance, he further wrote, "Ranaut captivates your attention in every frame and grows from strength to strength as the film progresses. This is clearly one of her best performances and the role itself lends ample scope for her to perform; Ranaut effortlessly brings Manikarnika to life". Devesh Sharma of Filmfare gave the film a rating of 3.5/5 and wrote, "Manikarnika manages to reintroduce one of the most awe-inspiring figures from India's past. A legend gets reborn, at least on screen, and maybe that's the only reality palatable to us right now". Praising Ranaut's performance he further wrote, "Ranaut looks to the manor born playing Laxmibai. She channels the spirit of the warrior queen and is her fierce best in war scenes and also manages to give us the glimpse of the icon's soft side". Umesh Punwani of Koimoi gave the film a rating of 3.5/5 and wrote, "Manikarnika is a visual form of our history chapters but a very intriguing and beautiful looking one. No one could have done this better than Ranaut and she is brutally bloody beautiful".

Lakshana N. Palat of India Today gave the film a rating of 3/5 and called Ranaut's performance in the film "excellent". She wrote, "If you're a Ranaut fan, Manikarnika is the film for you. If you remember your history lessons, take Manikarnika with a generous pinch of salt". Hannah Rachel Abraham of The Week gave the film a rating of 3/5 and wrote, "Ranaut certainly manages to don the role of our antar aatma ki aawaj, and has certainly made a praiseworthy effort in her directorial debut". Praising Ranaut's performance, she further wrote, "Ranaut is undoubtedly magnificent as the titular character. She brings a righteous anger and otherworldly fury to the character. Ranaut plays The Rani of Jhansi with such conviction that one does not even pay attention to the weak script that makes her force-feed the audience with long expositions drowning in patriotic fervour". Mayank Shekhar of Mid-Day gave the film a rating of 3/5 and wrote, "Manikarnika is a big-budget, wholly star-driven, action-packed, period picture. Except the star is female, which is rare enough". Praising Ranaut further, he wrote, "I can't imagine anybody as naturally earning that sobriquet as Ranaut. Dainty but fierce, Ranaut plays Rani Lakshmibai with the ferocity that suits her character best. She leads the charge not just as an actor, but also as director". Shubhra Gupta of The Indian Express gave the film a rating of 2.5/5 and wrote, "What keeps us with the film is Rani Ranaut, who in her best moments, owns her part, the single-track narrative, and the screen".

=== Overseas ===
Anita Ayer of the Khaleej Times gave the film a rating of 3.5/5 and stated, "Manikarnika belongs to Ranaut". Praising Ranaut's performance, he further wrote, "Ranaut does justice to the role by bringing to life the legendary war hero with her grit and fierce act. She also makes her debut as a co-director in this film, and you can feel her touch in the way Lakshmibai's personal life is portrayed". Rahul Aijaz of The Express Tribune gave the film a rating of 3.5/5 and wrote, "Manikarnika delivers on most fronts and proves an engaging affair from beginning to end. Ranaut appears in top form and even proves she can hang as a director". Praising Ranaut's performance, he further wrote, "Manikarnika is a one-woman show. Ranaut, in an avatar never seen before, displays a determination, fury and softness in her composure, body language, movement and expressions to bring the iconic rebel to life". Shilpa Jamkhandikar of Reuters wrote, "Ranaut does her best. She is awkward and stilted as the demure bride but comes into her own as the warrior queen. She adds a swagger to her stride and a steely determination to her demeanour that are hard not to cheer for. She is the only thing that make this film worth a watch". Ankur Pathak of HuffPost wrote, "Ranaut plays the titular role of Rani Laxmibai with conviction and brings a sense of ferocious energy to her character. The actress occupies nearly every frame of the movie, and one cannot fault her performance; Ranaut is in fine form here. Her dialogue delivery has a sense of command and ownership which makes you root for her".

== Box office ==
The digital distribution rights for the film were acquired by Amazon Prime Video for ₹40 crore and the satellite rights were purchased at ₹25 crore. The distribution rights for theatre screening were purchased at ₹65 crore. The film opened with ₹7.75 crore in domestic markets. On its second day, which coincided with Republic Day holiday, the film collected ₹18.10 crore. On its third day, the film remained steady and collected ₹15.50 crore, taking its opening weekend domestic collection to ₹41.35 crore, making it the highest weekend collection for a female-led film. Its domestic nett collection in the opening week was ₹61.15 crore. The domestic gross of the film as per Bollywood Hungama is ₹108.84 crore and in the overseas market film grossed ₹24.11 crore. The worldwide gross for the film is ₹132.95 crore (US$14 million). The film initially performed well internationally and in India in its theatrical run; however, it was declared an average performer by Box Office India. The holds the record for the highest opening weekend collections for a female-driven film in India. The film also became the highest Indian opener in Japan in January 2020. It ended its run, emerging as one of the highest-grossing women-centric films in India.

== Awards and nominations ==
Year	Award	Category	Recipient(s)	Result
2019	26th Screen Awards	Best Actress	Kangana Ranaut	Nominated
2019	Zee Cine Awards	Best Actress	Kangana Ranaut	Nominated
2020	65th Filmfare Awards	Best Actress	Kangana Ranaut	Nominated
2020	65th Filmfare Awards	Best Costume Design	Neeta Lulla	Nominated
2021	67th National Film Awards	Best Actress	Kangana Ranaut	Won Also for Panga

== Sequel ==
Kangana Ranaut and producer Kamal Jain have teamed up to work on a sequel titled Manikarnika Returns: The Legend of Didda. It would be based on the Kashmiri female ruler Didda. Sources close to the development revealed that the new film will be bigger and mounted on an international scale, adding that the team intends to make a world-class franchise of real-life women heroes.
