= Kangana Ranaut =

Indian actress, filmmaker, and politician (born 1986)

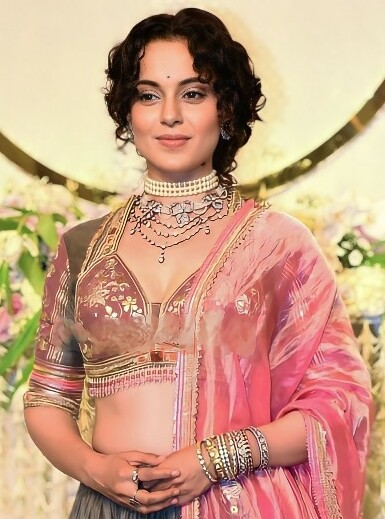
- Ranaut in 2024

Member of Parliament, Lok Sabha
- Incumbent
- Assumed office 4 June 2024
- Preceded by: Pratibha Singh
- Constituency: Mandi, Himachal Pradesh

Personal details
- Born: Kangna Amardeep Ranaut; 23 March 1986 (age 40) Mandi, Himachal Pradesh, India
- Party: Bharatiya Janata Party
- Occupation: Actress; filmmaker; politician
- Awards: Full list
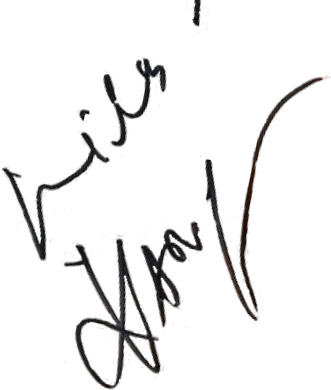
- Signature
- Years active: 2006–present
- Organisation: Manikarnika Films
- Works: Full list
- Honours: Padma Shri (2020)

Kangna Amardeep Ranaut (pronounced [kəŋɡənaː raːɳoːʈʰ]; born 23 March 1986) is an Indian actress, filmmaker, and politician serving as a Member of Parliament, Lok Sabha from Mandi since June 2024. Known for her portrayals of strong-willed, unconventional women in female-led Hindi films, she is the recipient of several awards, including four National Film Awards and four Filmfare Awards, and has featured six times in Forbes India's Celebrity 100 list. In 2020, the Government of India honoured her with the Padma Shri, the country's fourth-highest civilian award.

At the age of sixteen, Ranaut briefly took up modelling before being trained in acting under theatre director Arvind Gaur. She made her film debut in the 2006 thriller Gangster, for which she was awarded the Filmfare Award for Best Female Debut, and received praise for portraying emotionally intense characters in the dramas Woh Lamhe... (2006), Life in a... Metro (2007) and Fashion (2008). For the last of these, she won the National Film Award for Best Supporting Actress. She appeared in the commercially successful films Raaz: The Mystery Continues (2009) and Once Upon a Time in Mumbaai (2010) but was criticised for being typecast in neurotic parts. A comic role in Tanu Weds Manu (2011) was well-received, though this was followed by a series of brief, glamorous roles.

Ranaut's career prospects improved in 2013 when she played a mutant in the superhero film Krrish 3, one of the highest-grossing Indian films. She won two consecutive National Film Awards for Best Actress for playing an abandoned bride in the comedy-drama Queen (2014) and a dual role in the comedy sequel Tanu Weds Manu Returns (2015), which was the biggest-earning female-led Hindi film at the time. This was followed by several commercial failures and a decline in stardom, with the sole exception of her co-directorial epic action Manikarnika: The Queen of Jhansi (2019). Her portrayal of the titular warrior in it and her part as a sportswoman in Panga (2020) jointly earned her a fourth National Film Award. In Ranaut's second directorial, the poorly received biographical drama Emergency (2025), she portrayed Indira Gandhi.

In 2020, Ranaut launched her own production company, Manikarnika Films, under which she works as a director and a producer. She is known to be outspoken in interviews and on social media, addressing private and public matters. The opinions she has voiced, aligning with right-wing ideologies and supporting the Bharatiya Janata Party (BJP), along with frequent clashes in her personal and professional relationships, have sparked controversy.

== Early life and background ==
Kangna Amardeep Ranaut was born on 23 March 1986 (Note: A copy of Ranaut's passport, leaked in 2016, gives her year of birth as 1986.) at Bhambla (now Surajpur), a small town in the Mandi district of Himachal Pradesh, into a Rajput family. Her mother, Asha Ranaut, is a school teacher, and her father, Amardeep Ranaut, is a businessman. She has an elder sister, Rangoli Chandel, who as of 2014 works as her manager, and a younger brother, Akshat. Her great-grandfather, Sarju Singh Ranaut, was a Member of the Legislative Assembly representing the Sarkaghat Assembly constituency, and her grandfather was an IAS officer. She grew up in a joint family at their ancestral haveli (mansion) in Bhambla and described her childhood as "simple and happy".

According to Ranaut, she was "stubborn and rebellious" while growing up: "If my father would gift my brother a plastic gun and get a doll for me, I would not accept that. I questioned the discrimination." She did not subscribe to the stereotypes that were expected of her and experimented with fashion from a young age, often pairing up accessories and clothes that would seem "bizarre" to her neighbours. Ranaut was educated at the DAV School in Chandigarh, where she pursued science as her core subject, remarking that she was "very studious" and "always paranoid about [...] results". She initially intended to become a doctor on the insistence of her parents. However, a failed unit test in chemistry during her twelfth grade led Ranaut to reconsider her career prospects and despite preparing for the All India Pre Medical Test, she did not turn up for the exam. Determined to find her "space and freedom", she relocated to Delhi at the age of sixteen. Her decision not to pursue medicine led to constant feuding with her parents and her father refused to sponsor a pursuit he considered to be aimless.

In Delhi, Ranaut was unsure which career to choose; the Elite Modelling Agency were impressed by her looks and suggested that she model for them. She took on a few modelling assignments, but generally disliked the career as she found "no scope for creativity". Ranaut decided to shift focus towards acting and joined the Asmita Theatre Group, where she trained under the theatre director Arvind Gaur. She participated in Gaur's theatre workshop at the India Habitat Centre, acting in several of his plays, including the Girish Karnad-scripted Taledanda. During a performance, when one of the male actors went missing, Ranaut played his part along with her original role of a woman. A positive reaction from the audience prompted her to relocate to Mumbai to pursue a career in film and she enrolled herself for a four-month acting course in Asha Chandra's drama school.

Ranaut struggled with her meager earnings during this period, eating only "bread and aachar (pickle)". Refusing her father's financial assistance led to a rift in their relationship which she later regretted. Her relatives were unhappy with her decision to enter the film-making industry, and they did not correspond with her for several years. She reconciled with them after the release of Life in a... Metro in 2007.

== Film career ==
=== 2004–2008: Acting debut and critical acclaim ===
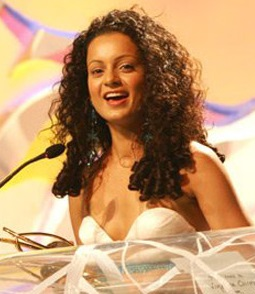
Ranaut at the 2006 Global Indian Film Awards where she won the Best Female Debut award for Gangster: A Love Story

In 2004, the producers Ramesh Sharma and Pahlaj Nilani announced that Ranaut would make her film debut with the Deepak Shivdasani-directed I Love You Boss. The following year, an agent took her to the office of the producer Mahesh Bhatt, where she interacted with the director Anurag Basu and auditioned for the lead role in the romantic thriller Gangster: A Love Story. Bhatt felt she was too young for the role and signed Chitrangada Singh instead. However, Singh was later unavailable to do the film and Ranaut was contracted as a replacement for Gangster, opting out of I Love You Boss. She was cast in the central role of Simran, an alcoholic woman caught in a romantic triangle between a notorious gangster (Shiney Ahuja) and a sympathetic friend (Emraan Hashmi). Ranaut was only seventeen while filming and said that she "had difficulty first in understanding and then unwinding from the character", describing her craft as "raw and immature". Released in 2006, Gangster emerged as a critical and commercial success. Raja Sen of Rediff.com said that "Kangana is a remarkable find, the actress coming across with great conviction". She won the Filmfare Award for Best Female Debut, along with various other debut awards.

Ranaut's next role was in the Mohit Suri-directed drama Woh Lamhe... (2006), a semi-biographical film based on the schizophrenic actress Parveen Babi and her relationship with the director Mahesh Bhatt. She said that portraying Babi had left her emotionally drained, as she had begun to "feel her desolation and loneliness." The film critic Subhash K. Jha of Sify wrote that Ranaut was the first Hindi film actress since Smita Patil and Shabana Azmi "who isn't scared to strip her soul naked for the camera", adding that she is a "hugely expressive actress with a phenomenal ability to convey torment, hurt and incredulity through the eyes". Despite positive reviews, the film underperformed at the box office.

The following year, Ranaut portrayed an aspiring musician in Suneel Darshan's musical thriller Shakalaka Boom Boom, alongside Bobby Deol, Upen Patel and Celina Jaitly. The film's production was marred by a dispute between Ranaut and Darshan; she objected to her voice being dubbed by another artist, but he insisted that he needed a particular "twang and accent" for her character. India Today described the film as an "amateur mess" and the film proved to be a box office flop. She next reunited with Anurag Basu for the ensemble drama Life in a... Metro, playing the supporting role of Neha, a shrewd socialite engaged in an affair with her married boss (Kay Kay Menon). Despite a poor initial run at the box office, the film emerged as a profitable venture. Khalid Mohamed of Hindustan Times was critical of the film, noting its lack of originality and realism. In a more positive review, Raja Sen wrote that Ranaut "is refreshing [...] and manages to herd her emotions well, playing a complex role but hardly ever overreaching", but criticised her delivery of English lines. For her role, Ranaut was awarded the Stardust Award for Breakthrough Performance – Female.

Ranaut next portrayed a village girl in Dhaam Dhoom (2008), a Tamil romantic thriller, opposite Jayam Ravi. Production on the film was temporarily halted when the director, Jeeva, died of cardiac arrest and the film was completed by the crew members. A review carried by Post wrote that Ranaut had "little scope" in a role that did not suit her. India Today described her next film, the drama Fashion (2008), as a "landmark" in her career. Set against the backdrop of the Indian fashion industry, the film features Ranaut as Shonali Gujral, a substance abusing supermodel struggling to cope with her foundering career. Because the media speculated that her role was based on the former model Geetanjali Nagpal (which Ranaut denied), the Delhi Commission for Women ordered a stay on the film's release, approving it only after a script narration. (Note: Geetanjali Nagpal was a controversial model in the 1990s whose substance abuse led her to the streets of Delhi. The DCW, who had represented her during court proceedings and helped her recovery through rehabilitation, was concerned that a negative depiction of her life would "affect her physical or mental health adversely".) With a worldwide revenue of ₹600 million (US$6.2 million), Fashion was a commercial success. Ranaut's performance drew unanimous critical acclaim. Taran Adarsh of Bollywood Hungama praised her confident portrayal of the character, and Nikhat Kazmi added that she "does an exquisite metamorphosis from a wispy, high-strung, nervous child-woman to a stunning ramp diva." Ranaut's portrayal earned her several awards, including the National Film Award and Filmfare Award for Best Supporting Actress.

=== 2009–2012: Career fluctuations ===
The supernatural horror film Raaz: The Mystery Continues from director Mohit Suri was Ranaut's first film release of 2009, in which she played a successful model who is possessed by a ghost. The film co-starred Emraan Hashmi and Adhyayan Suman and proved to be a financial success. Shubhra Gupta of The Indian Express noted that Ranaut was becoming stereotyped in roles that required her to be "hysterical", adding that she needed a "radical change of image". Also that year, she played the leading lady in the drama Vaada Raha and the Telugu action film Ek Niranjan, neither of which attracted particular notice.

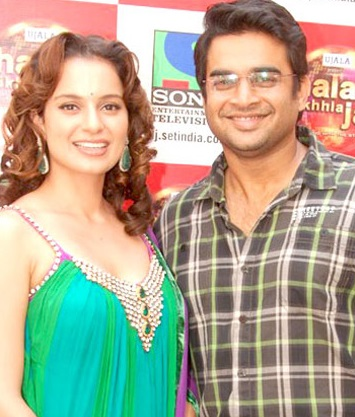
Ranaut with co-star R. Madhavan at a promotional event for Tanu Weds Manu, 2011

In a brief role in Anurag Basu's romantic thriller Kites (2010), Ranaut portrayed the fiancée of Hrithik Roshan's character. She said that she felt cheated after watching the film, as her role turned out much smaller than what she had initially signed up for. She then portrayed fictional film actress Rehana in the Milan Luthria-directed gangster film Once Upon a Time in Mumbaai. Also starring Ajay Devgn, Emraan Hashmi and Prachi Desai, the film chronicles the rise and subsequent fall of an underworld don (Devgn) in the 1970s. Ranaut said that her character was "a mix" of the actress Madhubala and the gangster Haji Mastan's wife and that to prepare she observed the work of the actresses Zeenat Aman and Parveen Babi. The film was one of the most successful releases of the year and garnered positive reviews from critics. Kaveree Bamzai of India Today argued that Ranaut had "never looked lovelier and been more playful", and Mid-Day's Sarita Tanwar found her "totally convincing" in the part. After playing a television reporter in the thriller Knock Out (2010), Ranaut actively looked for a comedy and found the role in Anees Bazmee's No Problem (2010), but both films failed to propel her career forward.

Having established a reputation for often taking on neurotic characters, Ranaut sought projects that would be "less emotionally exhausting". Her first release of 2011 was Anand L. Rai's Tanu Weds Manu, a romantic comedy opposite R. Madhavan, which she considers a "game changer" for her. She played Tanuja "Tanu" Trivedi, a foul-mouthed, free-spirited and rebellious university student from Kanpur who enters an arranged marriage with Manu (Madhavan), a London-based Indian doctor. Rai stated that he cast her for the role to illustrate that the actress was capable of playing other roles and that her character in the film was unlike any of those that she had played previously. Critical reaction to the film was mixed, though her performance was praised. Rajeev Masand wrote: "Kangana Ranaut is a pleasant surprise in a cheery, upbeat part that we haven't seen her take on before. She rises to the challenge, only hampered occasionally by her mangled dialogue delivery." She received Best Actress nominations at several award ceremonies, including Screen and Zee Cine.

Ranaut followed the success of Tanu Weds Manu by starring in a series of brief, glamorous roles in four other films of 2011: Game, Double Dhamaal, Rascals and Miley Naa Miley Hum. With the exception of Double Dhamaal, none of these films performed well. In a review for Rascals, Gaurav Malani of The Times of India wrote: "Kangana Ranaut is ill at ease in comedy. She struggles to hold her own and emerges as a bimbo in her act." Ranaut later admitted that she accepted some of these films due to a dearth of film offers as well as financial gain. The following year, she had a supporting role opposite Ajay Devgn in Priyadarshan's action thriller Tezz, another box-office flop.

=== 2013–2015: Established actress ===
The director Sanjay Gupta cast Ranaut in a brief role opposite John Abraham in the crime thriller Shootout at Wadala (2013) due to her ability to stand out in a predominantly male-centric film. The Daily News and Analysis' Tushar Joshi wrote that her role was written "to provide the sex quotient" and critic Vinayak Chakravorty opined that she "does not get much scope [...] beyond the steamy lovemaking grind". Commercially, the film performed moderately well.

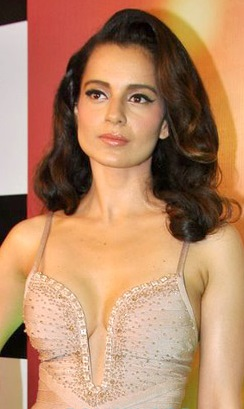
Ranaut at an event for Queen (2014), which won her the Filmfare and National Film Award for Best Actress

Ranaut achieved success later in 2013 for her portrayal of Kaya, a shapeshifting mutant in Rakesh Roshan's superhero film Krrish 3, alongside Hrithik Roshan, Priyanka Chopra and Vivek Oberoi. She initially declined the offer, given her disappointment with her role in Kites, which Rakesh Roshan produced. After other actresses had similarly turned down the role, Roshan approached Ranaut again and promised a better role, and she eventually accepted. Critics thought that Krrish 3 was entertaining but lacking in originality, though her performance garnered praise. Sarita Tanwar of Daily News and Analysis said "she is delightful as an alien making the weird hair and clothes work for her. She even manages to make you feel her pain. Quite an accomplishment that!" Earning ₹3 billion (US$31 million) worldwide, it emerged as one of the highest-grossing Bollywood films of all time, becoming Ranaut's most financially profitable venture. She later played the eponymous lead in the musical drama Rajjo (2013), a critical and commercial failure. Her portrayal of a nautch girl was largely criticised, with Rediff.com's Paloma Sharma commenting that she "struggles with her Mumbaiyya dialogues and is not as graceful in the dance sequences as one would have expected".

In 2014, Ranaut reinforced her status as a leading actress of Hindi cinema when she featured in the coming-of-age dramedy Queen; she also co-wrote the dialogues with Anvita Dutt Guptan. She played Rani, a naive girl who embarks on her honeymoon alone after her fiancé (Rajkummar Rao) calls off their wedding. Ranaut, who describes herself as "independent and confident", reflected that the role was one of the toughest she had played, as the character's personality traits contrasted with her own. The film and Ranaut's performance received unanimous acclaim from critics. Devesh Sharma of Filmfare wrote that the fact that she "flits from one aspect of her character to another without breaking stride shows her maturity as an actor"; Sudhish Kamath of The Hindu wrote: "Ranaut as Rani, in a role of a lifetime, makes Queen an absolutely delightful journey. She wins us over first with innocence, small-town charm, vulnerability, spirit, strength, warmth and her gradual confidence." The film exceeded expectations to emerge as a significant box-office hit, and Ranaut won both the Filmfare Award and the National Film Award for Best Actress for it. Queen has developed a cult status over the years and received scholarly recognition as an influential feminist film.

Ranaut followed this success by playing an aggressive politician in the black comedy Revolver Rani and a medical intern in the political drama Ungli (both 2014). Also that year, she made her production and directorial debut with an English language short film entitled The Touch, dealing with the relationship between a four-year-old boy and a dog; she co-wrote the screenplay with an Australian writer and filmed it in America.

The following year, Ranaut starred in Tanu Weds Manu Returns (2015), a sequel to Tanu Weds Manu, in which she portrayed dual roles—she reprised the character of Tanuja from the original and played the newly added part of Datto, an aspiring Haryanvi athlete. In preparation for the latter role, she interacted with students of the University of Delhi in disguise; in addition, she attended workshops to learn the Haryanvi language and trained in the sport of triple jump. The film received positive reviews from critics and Ranaut's performance was considered its prime asset. Sweta Kaushal of Hindustan Times praised her for perfecting the body languages and accents of the two women, and Saibal Chatterjee of NDTV wrote that she "fleshes out this pair of distinct individuals with such energy and finesse that it becomes difficult at times to tell that it is the same actress playing the two roles". Tanu Weds Manu Returns earned over ₹2.4 billion (US$25 million) worldwide, becoming the highest-grossing Bollywood film featuring a female protagonist. Ranaut won a Filmfare Critics Award and a second consecutive National Film Award for Best Actress, and received an additional Best Actress nomination at Filmfare.

Also in 2015, Ranaut appeared in the romantic comedies I Love NY (a production delayed since 2013) and Nikkhil Advani's Katti Batti, both of which failed at the box office. The latter saw her play opposite Imran Khan as a cancer patient, a role that critic Uday Bhatia of Mint thought "lack[ed] the sort of definition she's had in her last few roles".

=== 2017–present: Professional expansion and commercial failures ===
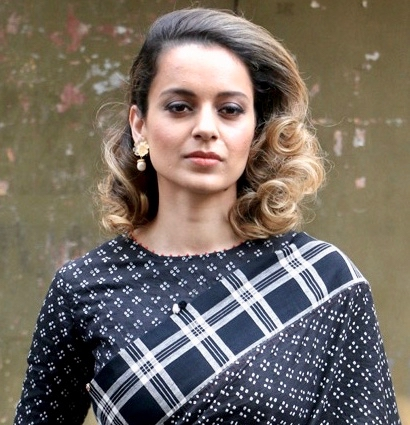
Ranaut at an event for Rangoon in 2017

After a year-long absence from the screen, Ranaut starred as Julia, a 1940s heroine and stunt-woman modelled on the actress Fearless Nadia in Vishal Bhardwaj's romance Rangoon (2017). She played the part as an "amalgamation of many characters" from that era and was particularly drawn toward its "fierceness and sensuality". She learned horse-riding and sword fighting and performed her own stunts. Media reports suggested a feud between Ranaut and Kapoor, and although they denied these, both stars publicly commented against the other. Rangoon received generally positive reviews, with praise directed at Ranaut's performance. Rohit Vats of Hindustan Times called her "terrific", and NDTV ranked her as one of the best actresses of the year. She received a nomination for the Filmfare Critics Award. The same year, Hansal Mehta's crime comedy Simran saw her in the role of a Gujarati immigrant in the United States who perpetrates a series of bank robberies to cover her debts. For the part, she learned Gujarati to improve her diction. She shared the screenwriting credit with Apurva Asrani for improvising several dialogues on set, but Asrani accused Ranaut and Mehta for not valuing his contributions to the script. Her performance in Simran was praised. Both Rangoon and Simran failed at the box office.

At the 67th National Film Awards, Ranaut was awarded a third Best Actress Award, for Manikarnika: The Queen of Jhansi (2019) and Panga (2020). For the former, a biopic of the Indian freedom fighter Rani of Jhansi, she also served as a co-director when Krish left the film after frequently clashing with Ranaut. Her co-star Sonu Sood also quit the production due to disagreements with her. Ranaut subsequently reshot a significant portion of the film, due to which its production cost doubled. The film opened to moderate mainstream success and mostly positive reviews, with primary emphasis placed on Ranaut's forceful presence in the role of the eponymous heroine. Rajeev Masand considered the film to be "a deliberately simplistic film; an old-fashioned patriotic saga told in the broadest of strokes, and with full nationalist fervor", but he commended Ranaut's "extraordinary performance", noting the way she "commands the screen with a fiery, arresting presence, never letting your attention wander away from her".

In her second film release of 2019, Ranaut reunited with Rajkummar Rao in the black comedy Judgementall Hai Kya, directed by Prakash Kovelamudi. She played an eccentric, mentally ill woman who seeks to expose a man (played by Rao) whom she suspects of killing his wife. Shubhra Gupta considered her to be "terrific" in the part and found "connections between what's happening on screen and Ranaut's off-screen seemingly off-kilter joustings which routinely make so much news of the wrong kind." The film underperformed at the box office, which Ranaut attributed to the high production costs resulting from her salary. Sukanya Verma listed Ranaut's performance in the film as one of the year's best, finding it "decidedly more complicated and twisted" than her "riveting" turn in Manikarnika. Ranaut received Filmfare Award nominations for her performances in both films.

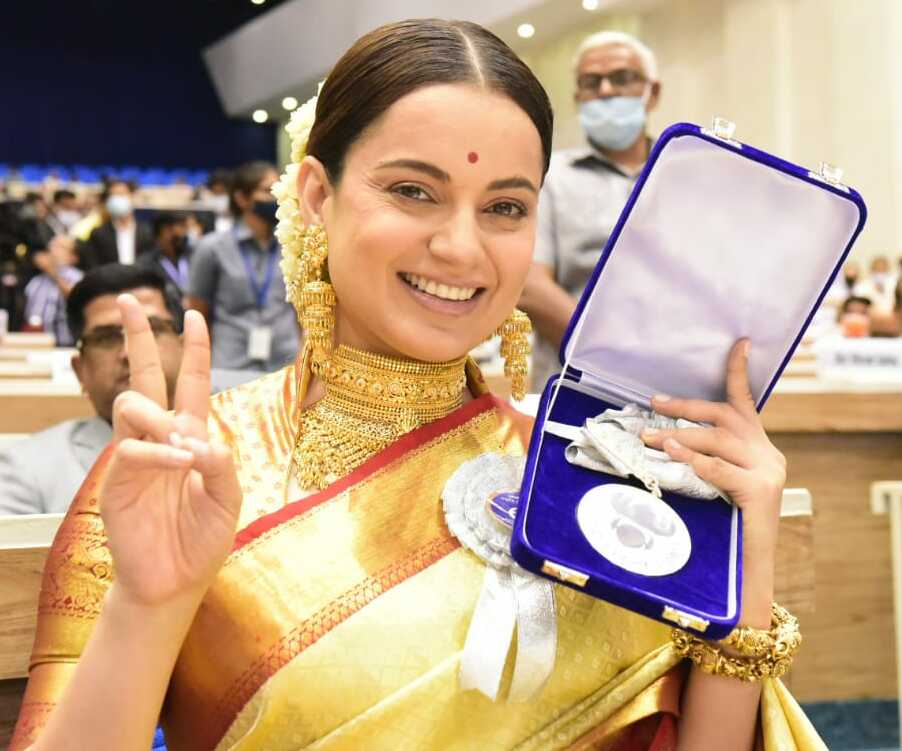
Ranaut with her Best Actress medal at the 67th National Film Awards in 2021

Ranaut began the new decade with Ashwiny Iyer Tiwari's sports drama Panga. She portrayed Jaya Nigam, a former kabaddi world champion who is encouraged by her husband to return to the sport. In preparation for the part, she underwent daily training over a period of five months and followed a strict, wholesome diet. Anupama Chopra of Film Companion noted the sensitivity in her performance, and Rachel Saltz of The New York Times commented: "Ranaut makes Jaya credible and specific; she’s not an every woman or every mom or every athlete. She’s this one, Jaya, and Ranaut makes you care about what kind of place she can find for herself in the world."

In 2020, Ranaut founded her production company, Manikarnika Films, and the next year, appeared in the biopic Thalaivii (2021), in which she and Arvind Swamy played the actor-turned-politicians J. Jayalalithaa and M. G. Ramachandran, respectively. For the part, Ranaut gained 20 kg (44 lb). The film met with mixed reviews from critics, who generally praised her performance. Baradwaj Rangan complimented her choice to not imitate Jayalalithaa but rather channel "the lack of power, the frustrations, the disappointments and the fact of what it meant to be a woman in politics back then", concluding that she "puts all of this across beautifully"; in contrast, Srivatsan S. from The Hindu believed she was miscast in the role, adding that Swamy's role is more lengthy than that of Ranaut. Her performance gained her a SIIMA Award for Best Actress – Tamil. She was nominated for a Filmfare Award for the part but expressed strong discontent over it, accusing Filmfare of being corrupt and unethical in their awarding system and threatening to sue them if her name was not withdrawn; her nomination was revoked for what the association rejected as "false accusations".

In 2022, Ranaut hosted the reality show Lock Upp, which streamed on ALTBalaji and MX Player to strong viewership. She then played a spy in the action film Dhaakad. It was her eighth box-office failure among her last nine films, with publications such as Bollywood Hungama and Box Office India commenting on her waning popularity. In 2023, she produced the black comedy film Tiku Weds Sheru, starring Nawazuddin Siddiqui and Avneet Kaur, which was panned by critics. She next played the title role of a dancer in the Tamil comedy horror sequel Chandramukhi 2 (2023). The film was panned by critics and was a major commercial failure. In a scathing review, Firstpost's Priyanka Sundar dismissed her performance as "melodramatic". Ranaut next portrayed the titular Indian Air Force pilot in the drama Tejas. Response to her performance was varied. Once again, it had meagre box-office returns.

Ranaut portrayed Indira Gandhi in her second directorial project, Emergency, about the 1977 Indian Emergency. Initially scheduled for release in 2024, the film failed to gain approval from the Central Board of Film Certification, and was eventually released after censorship in 2025. Its controversial subject matter, particularly the representation of the Sikhs, led to bans and protests in Punjab. Emergency was unpopular among critics and had poor financial returns. Journalist Coomi Kapoor, whose book The Emergency: A Personal History was a key reference for the film, sent legal notices to Ranaut and the film’s digital partner Netflix, accusing them of distorting historical facts and misrepresenting her work.

Ranaut next starred in the hospital thriller Bharat Bhhagya Viddhaata, written and directed by Manoj Tapadia and co-starring Girija Oak and Smita Tambe. Based on true events, the film follows the turbulent and selfless efforts of healthcare professionals at Cama Hospital as they treated and protected patients during the 2008 Mumbai attacks. Ranaut's role as leading nurse Geeta is inspired by Anjali Kulthe, who helped save 20 pregnant women during the events. Both the film and Ranaut's performance received rave reviews. Shubhra Gupta from The Indian Express noted the film's humanist approach and gripping proceedings and lauded "a resurgent Kangana Ranaut reclaiming her place as one of the best actresses working today" with a restrained performance. Critics further appreciated the integration of Ranaut's central role within the ensemble, which gave equal emphasis to the heroism of the other characters.

Ranaut will next reunite with R. Madhavan in a thriller titled Circle. She will also star in Queen 2, a sequel to her hit film Queen. Both films have completed filming and the release dates have yet to be announced.

== Political opinions and career ==
Ranaut identifies with right-wing ideologies, and is a supporter of the Bharatiya Janata Party (BJP) and Prime Minister Narendra Modi. An active commenter on social media, she often expresses political views, speaks of her religious affiliation and activity, and voices criticism of liberals as well as the Hindi film industry. Her direct ways and confrontational manner, as evidenced in several well-reported public clashes with colleagues around her views, have attracted some media scrutiny. In May 2021, Twitter permanently suspended her account for repeated violations of the company's abusive behaviour and hateful conduct policies. She returned to the platform when the ban was lifted in January 2023.

Ranaut has been active on commenting on political figures, some of which have resulted in serious criticism and backlash from several political leaders. She criticized then Chief Minister Uddhav Thackeray and his Government for mishandling the death of Sushant Singh Rajput in September 2020, following which several Shiv Sena leaders, including Sanjay Raut issued death threats to her. Additionally, on the orders of Shiv Sena leadership, the Brihanmumbai Municipal Corporation issued a backdated notice for illegal modifications of her house and demolished the illegal portions. Following the demolition, the Bombay High Court criticized the BMC and ruled in her favour, noting that BMC acted with malice and ordered the BMC to pay compensation to Ranaut. Given the nature of threats, Ranaut was given security from the Central Reserve Police Force from the Central Government. In November 2021, Ranaut termed India’s 1947 independence as "bheek" (alms) and stated that the country only attained "real freedom" in 2014 when the BJP came into power, a remark that drew widespread criticism across the political spectrum.

In October 2023, while promoting her film Tejas and shortly after the start of the Gaza war, Ranaut visited the Israeli embassy in New Delhi to meet Israel's ambassador to India, Naor Gilon. She described Hamas as "today's modern Ravana", said she hoped Israel would "win this war against terrorism", and told Gilon that "we as a Hindu nation stand with Israel's cause".

In March 2024, she was named by the BJP as a candidate for the 2024 Indian general election, which she contested from the Mandi Lok Sabha constituency. She won the seat after being elected over her main opponent Vikramaditya Singh. On 6 June 2024, Ranaut was slapped by a Central Industrial Security Force (CISF) constable at Chandigarh Airport in response to comments she had made on farmers protesting against a set of laws. The same year, Ranaut continued to make further remarks regarding the Farmers Protest and the Farm Laws, which drew criticism and led the BJP to reprimand her and distance itself from her statements.

In 2026, Ranaut criticised the 2026 Delhi Jantar Mantar protests, questioning their objective, claiming that demonstrations do not resolve issues and called the protests "puke-inducing". She further issued disparaging remarks against Gen Z women who participated in the protests, calling them "generation gutter", who "try to live independently without accountability" as "so-called westernised Indian women". According to Ranaut, these women are "not good at studies, but they are so ugly and corrupt that they cannot be homemakers either", yet they "proudly flaunt their freedom to use drugs, consume alcohol, or have endless body counts".

== Personal life ==
Ranaut has stated that her initial years in the film industry were marred with difficulties as she was unprepared to be an actress. She was conscious of her poor command of the English language and struggled to "fit in". In a 2013 interview with Daily News and Analysis, she recollected:

"People in the industry treated me like I didn't deserve to be spoken to and I was some unwanted object. I couldn't speak English fluently and people made fun of me for that. So dealing with rejection became a part of life. ... All that has taken a toll, I guess. I find it hard to deal with praise. Today, when people say that I have made it and made it on my own, I feel like locking up myself somewhere ... It scares me."

During the struggle, Ranaut found support in the actor Aditya Pancholi and his wife Zarina Wahab and considered them her "family away from home". She became embroiled in a well publicised scandal when the media speculated on the nature of her relationship with Pancholi. She declined to speak about it openly, although she made several public appearances with him. In 2007 it was reported that Ranaut had filed a police complaint against Pancholi for physically assaulting her under the influence of alcohol. The following year Pancholi confirmed the affair in an interview, saying that he had been cohabiting with Ranaut in the past and accused her of owing him ₹2.5 million (US$26,000). In response, Ranaut's spokesperson said that "after physically assaulting her in the middle of a road, he has no right to expect anything from her", adding that she had "already given ₹5 million (US$52,000) to [him] as a goodwill gesture". Ranaut later said that the incident had left her "physically and mentally" damaged.

While filming Raaz: The Mystery Continues in 2008, Ranaut began a romantic relationship with co-star Adhyayan Suman. On Suman's insistence that he focus on his professional career, the couple separated the following year. From 2010 to 2012, she was involved in a long-distance romance with Nicholas Lafferty, an English doctor; she described the relationship as "the most normal" she ever had, but the couple split amicably as she was not ready for marriage. She has since maintained that she will never get married, and has expressed a desire to not be bound by a relationship. In 2016, Hrithik Roshan, her co-star from Krrish 3, filed a lawsuit against Ranaut accusing her of cyber stalking and harassment. Denying the charges, Ranaut filed a counter-charge against Roshan, claiming that his lawsuit was an attempt to cover-up their affair for the benefit of his divorce proceedings. The case was closed later that year owing to lack of evidence.

Ranaut lives in Mumbai with her sister Rangoli, who was the victim of an acid attack in 2006. She makes yearly visits to her hometown of Bhambla. A practicing Hindu, Ranaut follows the teachings of the spiritual leader Swami Vivekananda and considers meditation to be "the highest form of worshipping God". She practices vegetarianism and was listed as "India's hottest vegetarian" in a poll conducted by PETA in 2013. Since 2009 she has been studying the dance form of Kathak from the Nateshwar Nritya Kala Mandir. In 2026, Ranaut said she considers herself an "awakened Hindu" rather than a "moderate Hindu," claiming her views changed over time and alleging that "people become Leftist after meeting Islamists." She has said that the technical process of filmmaking is of tremendous interest to her, and to better her understanding of it Ranaut enrolled in a two-month screenplay writing course at the New York Film Academy in 2014. In an interview with Filmfare she said that despite her stardom, she wants to lead a normal life: "I don't want to lose my rights as a common person to learn and grow".

== Public image and artistry ==
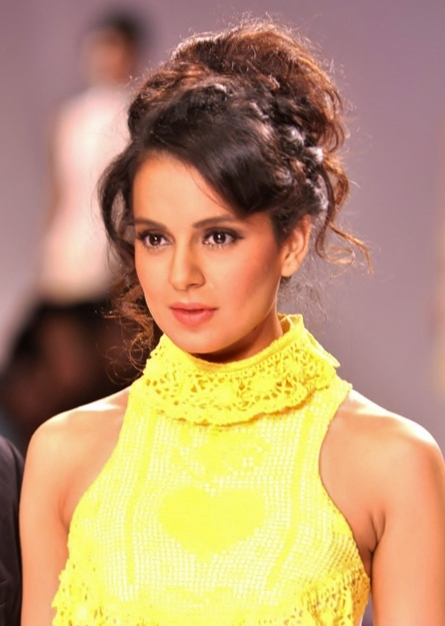
Ranaut at the Signature International Fashion Weekend in 2013

In the book Acting Smart: Your Ticket to Showbiz, Tisca Chopra describes Ranaut as a "free-spirited, original creative" person "who cannot really be slotted in a particular mould". Ranaut is particularly known for her forthrightness in expressing her opinions in public on issues ranging from film to feminism. A televised 2013 interview hosted by Anupama Chopra in which Ranaut spoke out against gender bias and nepotism in Bollywood went viral online, which led Sunaina Kumar of Tehelka to write: "In this age of cookie-cutter heroines with stock responses, Kangana Ranaut is refreshingly real and honest." Noted for paving her way to stardom without prior connections in the film industry, she was described by Kaveree Bamzai as "a permanent outsider who can play the game better than most insiders". Ranaut had a public fallout with the filmmaker Karan Johar when she accused him of nepotism during a chat show appearance in 2017. She has since continued to advocate against nepotism in the industry, more so after the death of Sushant Singh Rajput, when she accused influential film professionals of having "systematically sabotaged" his career.

Analysing Ranaut's career, the journalist Parmita Uniyal, in 2014, noted that she "loves to challenge herself with tricky roles and manages to add a different dimension to her character every time." A reviewer for Rediff.com described her in 2013 as a "director's actress" who is susceptible to both "shine and crumble under the right/wrong guidance". Anand L. Rai (the director of Tanu Weds Manu) says that Ranaut actively pursues roles in which she can "work in her own space and not become a mere prop in the male-dominated Bollywood", and Milan Luthria (the director of Once Upon a Time in Mumbaai) labels her a chameleon for her transformative acting ability. Alongside actress Vidya Balan, Ranaut has been credited for spearheading a movement that breaks stereotypes of a Hindi film heroine by playing the protagonist in films not starring a well-known male star. Namrata Joshi wrote that Ranaut's unconventional choices of parts and films set her apart from her contemporaries. According to BBC News' Shailaja Bajpai, Ranaut is an "outstanding performer" and a natural actress who has played "strong, unusual women" which have helped her carve a "special niche for herself". After Rangoon, Anupama Chopra hailed her as "arguably the finest actress working in Hindi cinema today". In 2023, Rajeev Masand named her one of Hindi cinema's best actresses.

Following the success of Queen and Tanu Weds Manu Returns, Deccan Chronicle labelled Ranaut as "one of the most bankable actresses in the industry", and Daily News and Analysis reported that she had emerged as one of the highest-paid actresses in Bollywood. She was featured by Forbes India in their annual Celebrity 100 list in 2012, 2014–2017, and 2019. In 2017, Forbes calculated her annual salary to be ₹320 million (US$3.3 million), one of the highest amongst actresses in the country. She was featured in The Indian Express's listing of the most powerful Indians from 2017 to 2019, and again in 2022.

Ranaut has been cited as a sex symbol and style icon in India. Analysing her off-screen persona, Hindustan Times published that she was initially written off by Indian journalists due to her "funny accent" and the negative publicity generated by her troubled relationships; however, her defining fashion choices and her unconventional film roles eventually established her as a star. She has frequently featured in listings of the most attractive and stylish celebrities in India. She ranked among the top 10 on The Times of India's listing of the "Most Desirable Woman" in 2010, 2011, 2013 and 2015. Ranaut was featured on Verve's listing of the most powerful women of 2010 and in 2012 she was named the "Best Dressed Personality" by the Indian edition of People. In 2013, she featured as one of the best-dressed women celebrities by Vogue India. The journalist Jagmeeta Thind Joy credits the actress for her "quirky, almost non-Bollywood take on personal style", adding that she "likes to shock and awe with her choices". She has collaborated with the fashion brand Vero Moda to launch two clothing lines for the company—Marquee and Venice Cruise—in 2015 and 2016, respectively.

== Filmography and accolades ==
Ranaut has been the recipient of four National Film Awards: one Best Supporting Actress award for Fashion (2008) and three Best Actress awards, one each for Queen (2014) and Tanu Weds Manu Returns (2015) and a third one for her performances in both Manikarnika, the Queen of Jhansi (2019) and Panga (2020). She has also won four Filmfare Awards: Best Female Debut and a special award ("Face of the Year") for Gangster (2006), Best Supporting Actress for Fashion, Best Actress for Queen, and Best Actress – Critics for Tanu Weds Manu Returns. In 2020, she was awarded the Padma Shri, the fourth-highest civilian award, by the Government of India, for her contribution in the field of arts.

== Bibliography ==
- Dasgupta, Rohit K.; Datta, Sangeeta (2018). 100 Essential Indian Films. Rowman & Littlefield. ISBN 978-1-4422-7799-1.
- Gupta, Shubhra (10 December 2016). 50 Films That Changed Bollywood, 1995-2015. Harper Collins. ISBN 978-93-5177-848-6.
- Rao, Maithili (3 January 2020). "Waif to Warrior—Kangana Ranaut". In Viswamohan, Aysha Iqbal; Wilkinson, Clare M. (eds.). Stardom in Contemporary Hindi Cinema: Celebrity and Fame in Globalized Times. Springer Nature. pp. 215–228. ISBN 978-981-15-0191-3.

Lok Sabha
Preceded by Pratibha Singh	Member of Parliament for Mandi; Since 2024	Incumbent
