= Oppo UDP-203 =

- Manufacturer: Oppo Digital
- Product family: UDP
- Type: Media player
- Released: December 12, 2016
- Discontinued: 2018
- Media: Ultra HD Blu-ray
- Dimensions: 16.9 x 12.2 x 3.1 inches
- Weight: 9.5lbs (4.3kg)

The Oppo UDP-203 is Oppo Digital's Ultra HD Blu-ray player released in 2016.

== Features ==
The player supports HDR10 and Dolby Vision high-dynamic-range standards. The Dolby Vision support was added in a firmware update on June 6, 2017. Unlike Oppo's BDP-103 and BDP-105, the UDP-203 doesn't support CDs encoded with HDCD.

== Reception ==
Sound & Vision concluded: "You can buy an Ultra HD Blu-ray player for less. But here in early 2017, I can’t imagine you’ll find one that offers better performance, flexibility, and build quality than the Oppo UDP-203." What Hi-Fi? said the player "sets a new home cinema standard". CNET summarized: "The Oppo UDP-203 is an excellent high-end 4K Blu-ray disc player, but image quality improvements over cheaper players are tough to spot." Audioholics said: "The UDP-203/205 leave videophiles wanting very little and both players should satisfy all but the most critical audiophiles." TechRadar called it "easily one of the best Blu-ray players money can buy". TechHive noted it as the best 4K UHD Blu-ray player on the market.
