= Oppo BDP-105 =

- Manufacturer: Oppo Digital
- Product family: BDP
- Type: Media player
- Released: 2012
- Introductory price: $1,199
- Media: Blu-ray
- Dimensions: 16.8 x 12.2 x 4.8 inches (430 x 311 x 123mm)
- Weight: 17.3 lb (7.9 kg)
- Predecessor: BDP-95
- Successor: UDP-205

The Oppo BDP-105 is Oppo Digital's Blu-ray player released in late 2012.

== Features ==
The BDP-105 has support for Blu-ray 3D, DVD-Audio, and Super Audio CD formats. Compared to the cheaper BDP-103 model, BDP-105 has Sabre 32-bit digital-to-analog converters (DAC), headphone amplifier, and additional audio inputs. The BDP-105D model includes Darbee's video processing.

== Reception ==
Sound & Vision said the player is not cheap but it has a great picture and sound. CNET called it "an extraordinary Blu-ray player". They said the sound capabilities are what makes the player special. What Hi-Fi? liked the format compatibility and build quality but said the bass could sound better and the player's display could be more informative. Home Cinema Choice wrote: "Overall, the BDP-105D retains its reference status, not least because of the bravura nature of its AV chops and that positively divine construction." They were unconvinced by the DarbeeVision processing technology. Audioholics wrote: "From the BDP-105’s impeccable benchmark performance to its excellent build quality and usability, this player leaves you wanting nothing." Stereophile compared it to the BDP-103 and said: "105 sounded cleaner, smoother, and more detailed, regardless of source or number of channels". AudioXpress said the player has "[...] state-of-the-art video capabilities and a list of features that leaves little, if anything, to be desired [...]". The Absolute Sound concluded: "Oppo’s affordable, one-box, crossover solution should get a lot of enthusiasts’ mouths watering."
