= Lexicon (company) =

American audio equipment manufacturer

- Type: Subsidiary
- Industry: Audio electronics
- Founded: 1971
- Headquarters: Woodbury, Orange County, New York
- Key people: Francis F. Lee; Chuck Bagnaschi; Dr. David Griesinger
- Products: Professional audio production equipment, home theater equipment, consumer audio, vehicle audio
- Owner: Samsung Electronics
- Parent: Harman International Industries
- Website: Official website

Lexicon is an American company that engineers, manufactures, and markets audio equipment as a brand of Harman International Industries. The company was founded in 1971 with headquarters in Waltham, Massachusetts, and offices in Salt Lake City, Utah. It was acquired by Harman in 1993.

Lexicon traces its history to the 1969 founding of American Data Sciences by MIT professor Dr. Francis F. Lee and engineer Chuck Bagnaschi, developers of digital audio devices for medical heart monitoring.

== History ==
In 1971, Francis F. Lee founded the Lexicon company, based in Waltham, Massachusetts. The company was purchased by Harman in 1993.

== Professional audio equipment ==
=== Digital delay systems ===
Lexicon was a pioneer of commercial digital delay products, competing with Eventide, Inc. The first Lexicon product to market was the popular Gotham Delta T-101 delay in 1971, followed by the Delta T-102, the first product to bear the Lexicon name, in 1972.

=== Reverb and effects ===
Lexicon is considered "the godfather of digital reverb", as one of the early players on the reverb/reverberation market. The company was among the first to produce commercially available digital reverb equipment, unveiling the Model 224 at the 1978 AES convention. The 224 was not the first commercial digital reverb (that distinction belongs to EMT's 250), but its lower price and rack-mounted design helped make it one of the most widely adopted early high-end digital reverbs. Also released in 1979 was the Prime Time, one of the first digital delay units designed explicitly to provide effects. In 1986, Lexicon released the 480L, a successor of the 224XL.

The PCM series was introduced as a smaller, more economical option, particularly in live situations where the 224XL was too cumbersome for a rack rider. First in the series was the PCM-60 (1984), followed a few years later by the Lexicon PCM-70, the latter adding multi-effects from the 224X and a digital screen interface. The MRC, an early MIDI control surface, was released in the late 1980s to provide remote control of the PCM-70, LXP series processors, and other MIDI devices. David Gilmour from Pink Floyd used a Lexicon PCM-70 to store the circular delay sounds in songs such as "Shine On You Crazy Diamond" and "Time" in 1994's The Division Bell Tour.

In the 1990s, Lexicon continued the PCM series with two new units, the PCM-80 reverb/multi-effects unit and PCM-90 digital reverb. The NuVerb, one of the first add-on DSP cards, was released in 1993 as a plug-in card for NuBus-based Macintosh computers. This card was repurposed and released in 1997 as the Model 300, another iconic reverb/multi-effect unit. Lexicon continued the PCM series in the 2000s with new mid-level units including the PCM-96 and PCM-96 Surround, standalone reverb units that easily integrate into digital audio workstation (DAWs).

Also from the 1990s comes the consumer-level LXP series including the LXP-1, LXP-5, LXP-15, and the LXP-15II, and later the affordable MPX1. A new low-priced reverb series, the MX series, was introduced in the 2000s, with the Lexicon MX200 as the entrance model.

=== HD recording ===
Lexicon was a pioneer in the hard disk recording market, introducing the Opus system in 1988. This system feature 8 channels of disk I/O along with an integrated 12-channel digital mixer. In the following years, Opus was upgraded with EQ and console automation. In the mid 1990s, Lexicon Studio and Core2 audio interfaces were introduced. They were notable in that they could be expanded with a Lexicon reverb daughterboard that was then accessible to the recording software.

=== Electroacoustic enhancement ===
In 1988, Lexicon developed LARES, an electronic processing system intended to give performance spaces a tailored acoustic experience. LARES uses microphones to pick up the sound, central processing units to apply time-variant anti-feedback, delay and reverberation algorithms, and banks of loudspeakers to bring the enhanced audio signal back into the performance space. LARES Associates split away from Lexicon in 1995. Lexicon continues to benefit from its initial LARES research and development with the company offering a scaled-down and simplified microprocessor controller, the MC-12, intended for auditory enhancement within home and professional listening spaces. The system is called Lexicon LIVE.

== Home theater equipment ==
Lexicon's first foray into home theater equipment was with its surround processor, the CP-1. Later, a CP-2 was released, followed by the CP-3 and the CP-3+. The CP-3/CP-3+ were the first of its home theater products to be THX certified.

With the arrival of Dolby Digital, the CP line had to be discontinued. It was replaced with the DC line, namely the DC-1 [1996] and the DC-2. It was at this point that the company introduced its revolutionary surround processing algorithm Logic 7. Logic 7 was notable for generating a convincing soundfield from seven loudspeakers when presented with either a stereo or 5.1 input.

After a while, Lexicon added the MC-1 to its lineup of the DC-1 and DC-2, and the MC-1 became its new flagship.

A few years later, Lexicon introduced the MC-12 and the MC-12b. The MC-12b was in all respects identical to the MC-12 except that it had balanced outputs in addition to the standard unbalanced ones. Shortly after this, Lexicon filled in the lower end of its product line by providing an MC-8 and an MC-4. They also produced a receiver, the RV-8.

As of this writing (8/2016), its current flagship is the MC-14. Conspicuously absent from this model is the room correction offered by its recent predecessors such as the MC-12.

In addition to surround processors, Lexicon also sells the LX and CX multi-channel home theater amplifiers and the RT-20 DVD player. Its discontinued NT line of amplifiers was rebadged Bryston amplifiers.

=== Lexicon BD-30/THX certification controversy ===
In 2010, an Audioholics.com review revealed that the chassis and internal components of Lexicon's BD-30 Blu-ray player (retail price $3500) was identical to that of the Oppo BDP-83 (retail price $500); audiovisual testing indicated no changes were made in performance either. Furthermore, it appears that this player was given THX certification (the first Blu-ray player with this distinction), despite failing fundamental THX tests. Currently, evidence of its certification has largely disappeared from the THX website after this was revealed.
