= Samsung SPH-M100 =

Mobile phone model

Samsung SPH-M100 (UpRoar)
- Manufacturer: Samsung Electronics
- Type: Feature phone
- Availability by region: 2001 (U.S.)
- Related: Samsung SPH-M620 (UpStage)
- Compatible networks: Sprint PCS/CDMA 1900
- Form factor: clamshell
- Dimensions: 4.1 x 1.7 x 0.9 in (106 x 46 x 23 mm)
- Weight: 4.2 oz (119 g)
- Memory: 64 MB
- Battery: Lithium-Ion
- Display: five-line Segment
- Connectivity: USB

The Samsung SPH-M100 (marketed by Sprint in the United States as the Samsung UpRoar) is a cellphone and MP3 player launched in 2000 and was the first cell phone to have MP3 music playback capabilities. The phone was named one of the All-TIME 100 greatest and most influential gadgets from 1923 to 2010 by Peter Ha in Time.
