= Lexicon MX200 =

The Lexicon MX200 is an effects processor from the early 2000s made by Lexicon of Salt Lake City. The company calls it a "dual reverb effects processor", since it contains two separate channels that can be channeled mono or in various stereo configurations, with most of the 32 effects being variations on reverb.

Notable about the MX200 is that it is an external hardware effects unit that can be incorporated in a DAW as a plug-in. Besides the "classic Lexicon reverb sound" in many varieties, it has a number of other effects. Two of these can be run simultaneously in four options (one dual mono configuration, and three different stereo options). Three parameters are controllable for each effect; 99 patches are preset, and 99 more can be stored by the user. The unit works at a maximum rate of 48 kHz, and communicates via MIDI/USB. According to Sound on Sound, it gets "the 'hardware as plug-in' paradigm right", and has "exceptional" sound quality. Other reviewers have praised the unit's simplicity and the overall quality and usability of the effects.
