= Francis F. Lee =

Chinese-American inventor (1927–2024)

Francis Fan Lee
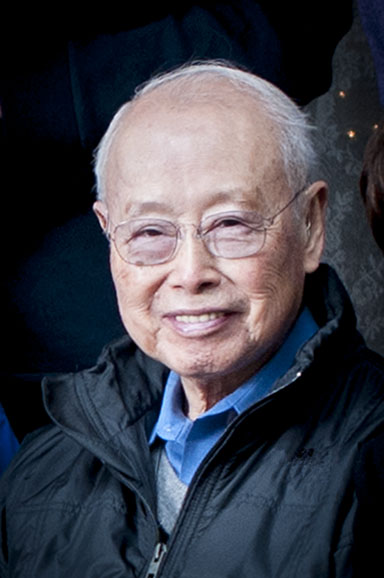
- Lee in 2015
- Born: January 28, 1927; Nanjing, China
- Died: January 12, 2024 (aged 96); San Mateo, California, U.S.
- Education: Massachusetts Institute of Technology
- Occupations: Inventor, engineer and academic
- Employer(s): Lexicon, Inc, Massachusetts Institute of Technology
- Scientific career
- Doctoral advisors: Samuel Jefferson Mason; Morris Halle

Francis Fan Lee (李凡, January 28, 1927 – January 12, 2024) was a Chinese-American inventor, businessman, and professor emeritus of Electrical Engineering and Computer Science at the Massachusetts Institute of Technology (MIT). Lee was the founder of Lexicon (company) (originally American Data Sciences). He is best known for three inventions: the Digital Cardiac Monitor (1969), the Digital Audio Signal Processor (1971), and the Digital Time Compression System (1972). In 1984, Lexicon won an Emmy Award for Engineering Excellence for the Model 1200 Audio Time Compressor and Expander, widely used in the television industry.

== Education ==
Lee was born January 28, 1927, in Nanjing, China. In September 1948, during the Chinese Civil War, Lee left Shanghai aboard the USS General W.H. Gordon to complete his undergraduate education at the Massachusetts Institute of Technology. He studied Electrical Engineering and earned his Bachelor of Science in 1950 and Master of Science in 1951. In Fall 1952, Lee entered the PhD program at MIT. He withdrew in 1954 to pursue his career, becoming a naturalized US citizen on November 15, 1954. He would later return to complete his Ph.D at MIT in 1965.

== Early career ==
In early 1954, Lee took a full-time position as Research Engineer with the Servomechanism Laboratory. He was part of a team working on the first Digitally Controlled Milling Machine In 1955, Lee joined the Bizmac Computer Division of RCA. He left a year later to join the UNIVAC super-computer division of Remington Rand.

He returned to academia in 1964, and completed his PhD in Electrical Engineering in 1965. He then joined the MIT faculty as an Associate Professor of Electrical Engineering and Computer Science. He was promoted to full professor in 1968 and served until early retirement in 1987.

=== Project MAC ===
In 1963, Lee accepted a one-year appointment to work on Project MAC, a time-sharing Multiple Access Computer being developed at MIT under the direction of Robert Fano. Fano launched Project MAC with a 6-week summer session that drew 57 people (including Lee) from universities, industry, and government for brainstorming and collaboration. At the end of the session, Lee described his work on speeding up computer memory in "Lookaside Memory Implementation" (1963). Six years later, Lee presented "Study of Look-Aside Memory," at the IEEE (Institute of Electrical and Electronics Engineers) conference: Transactions on Computers, held in June 1969. Lee's paper was published in IEEE Transactions on Computers. Look-Aside Memory is a forerunner of cache memory.

=== Reading Machine Project ===
At the end of his Project MAC appointment, Lee resumed his graduate studies at MIT and joined Dr. Samuel Jefferson Mason's Cognitive Information Processing Group in the Research Laboratory of Electronics at MIT. Lee's group worked on a reading machine for the blind, the first system that would scan text and produce continuous speech. For his Ph.D. thesis, Lee developed a method for converting printed words into phoneme-based spoken language. Lee presented and published two papers on this work.

== Later professional life and inventions ==
In 1969, Lee founded American Data Sciences (ADS) with junior partner Charles L. Bagnaschi, an engineer. The company's name was changed to Lexicon Inc. in 1971. Their focus was applying digital delay to audio technology and language instruction. In 1973, Lee brought in Ron Noonan as CEO to diversify Lexicon in the professional audio market.

=== Digital Cardiac Monitoring System ===
Lee applied his knowledge of digital design to Electrocardiography (ECG) technology. At the time, waveforms moved left to right across the screen, then returned to a starting point. A digital delay device would allow heartbeats to be monitored with a continuous moving image on a cathode ray terminal (CRT). Lee brought in Professor Stephen K. Burns, an MIT colleague with a strong interest in bio-medical electronics, to help develop the machine, patented in 1971. Lee and Burns licensed the machine first to Becton Dickinson Company, a bio-medical company, followed by Hewlett-Packard and General Electric Company.

=== Audio delay ===
The cardiac digital delay unit led to Lee's work in digital audio delay. At the time, sound delay technology (used to create deliberate echo effects) relied on tape loops and recording devices. MIT lecturer Barry Blesser suggested they try running audio through Lee's digital delay apparatus. With Bagnaschi, they created the first digital signal processor. Steve Temmer, the president of New York City’s Gotham Audio, heard about the experiment and commissioned 50 units of what would be sold as the Gotham Delta-T 101 in 1971, introducing digital delay to the live sound industry.

=== Digital Digital Time-Compression and Expansion: Varispeech ===
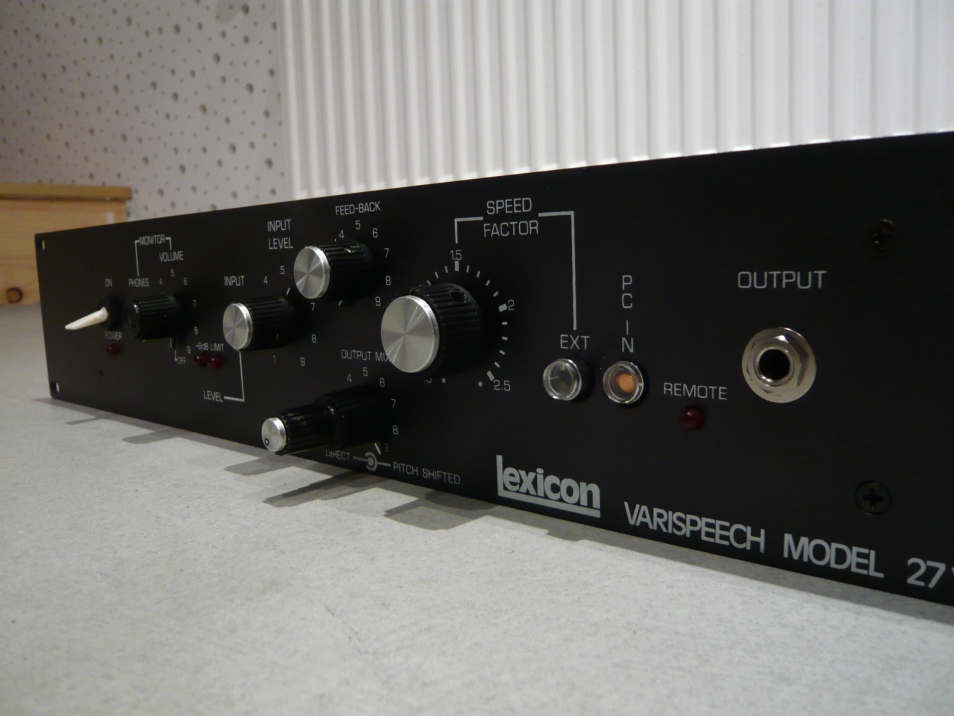

In 1972, Lee filed a patent for a device that could compress or expand the time duration of sound waves while preserving normal sound quality. That year, Lexicon introduced Varispeech, an electronic speech compressor for use in the language instruction market, specifically to help blind students access text more quickly and persons with speech disorders study spoken language. Varispeech, the first commercially available pitch shifter, could speed up or slow down recorded speech, while maintaining normal pitch.

==== Audio Time Compressor and Expander ====
An advanced version of Varispeech—the Time Compressor 1200—was introduced in 1981. The device coupled audio time-compression with visual components, allowing broadcasters to show movies and recorded programs at an accelerated rate without audio distortion. Programming and advertisements could be made to fit time slots without cutting. Technicians referred to this process as "lexiconning." Lexicon CEO Ron Noonan described the technology avoiding the "tyranny of scissors." The device was also promoted for creative uses, such as heightening excitement in a TV program or news broadcast by speeding up time. Lexicon's Time Compressor Model 1200 received an Emmy in 1984 from the National Academy of Television Arts and Sciences for its technical contributions to editing.

==== Controversy and creativity ====
Critics argued that the Time Compressor technology, particularly when applied to movies and older television programs, amounted to "defacing" a creative work, analogous to colorization. Film director Elliot Silverstein argued that, "To use these devices before the artist completes his work makes it part of the creative process. But once the artist has completed his work, to change it without his permission, however subtly, may prejudice his honor or reputation." However, some artists took advantage of the creative possibilities. Stanley Kubrick, for example, used the time-compression device to speed up the sound of guns firing in Full Metal Jacket to intensify the battle scenes. American musician and producer Chris Walla used the early model, Varispeech, to create audio effects, such as making "everything sound like Dr. Who." Pat Metheny describes using Lexicon digital reverb and digital delay technology to "create the 'chorused' thing that i guess i would have to say i was the first to use extensively in jazz and that seemed to have influenced a lot of other guys to do the same."

== Selling Lexicon ==
The company went public in 1985 on the London Stock Exchange. In 1995, Lexicon was sold to Harman International Industries.

== Death ==
Lee died from renal failure in San Mateo, California, on January 12, 2024, at the age of 96.

== Awards ==
1964: Hertz Fellowship for Graduate Studies. Awarded by the Hertz Foundation.

1975: Audio Engineering Society Publication Award. For his paper "Time Compression and Expansion of Speech by the Sampling Method."

1984: Emmy Award for Lexicon's Time Compressor Model 1200. Awarded by National Academy of Television Arts and Sciences (NATAS) for Technical Contribution to Editing.

1985: Audio Engineering Society's Silver Medal Award (formerly the Emile Berliner Award), given in recognition of outstanding development or achievement in the field of audio engineering

== Publications ==
- Lee, F.F. (1969). "Study of "Look-Aside" Memory". IEEE Transactions on Computers (11): 1062–1064. doi:10.1109/T-C.1969.222581. S2CID 26497189.
- Blesser, Barry A.; Lee, Francis F. (May 1971). "An Audio Delay System Using Digital Technology". Journal of the Audio Engineering Society. 19 (5): 393–397.
- Lee, Francis F. (November 1972). "Time Compression and Expansion of Speech by the Sampling Method". Journal of the Audio Engineering Society. 20 (9): 738–742.
- Lee, Francis F.; Lipschutz, David (May 1977). "Floating-Point Encoding for Transcription of High-Fidelity Audio Signals". Journal of the Audio Engineering Society. 25 (5): 266–272.
