= Oppo Digital =

Division of Oppo

Oppo Digital Inc.
- Type: Subsidiary
- Industry: Consumer electronics
- Founded: 2004; 22 years ago
- Founders: Chen Mingyong (陈明永)
- Headquarters: Menlo Park, California, United States
- Area served: Worldwide
- Products: Headphones, Blu-ray players
- Parent: Oppo
- Website: www.oppodigital.com

OPPO Digital Inc. (Chinese: OPPO影音) is an overseas division of Chinese multinational electronics company Oppo.

Established in 2004 in Menlo Park, California, it conducted all of its sales online. OPPO Digital offered audio and video equipment, including Blu-ray Disc players and personal audio products such as headphones.

In April 2018, OPPO Digital announced they were stopping production and development of new products but would continue to support existing customers.

== Products ==
In 2007 and 2008, OPPO introduced the DV-980H and DV-983H, DVD-to-1080p upconversion, multi-format players.

In 2009, OPPO introduced a "universal" Blu-ray player, BDP-83, compatible with DVD-Audio and Super Audio CD formats. The unit included a video decoder from MediaTek and a video processing chip from Anchor Bay Technologies.

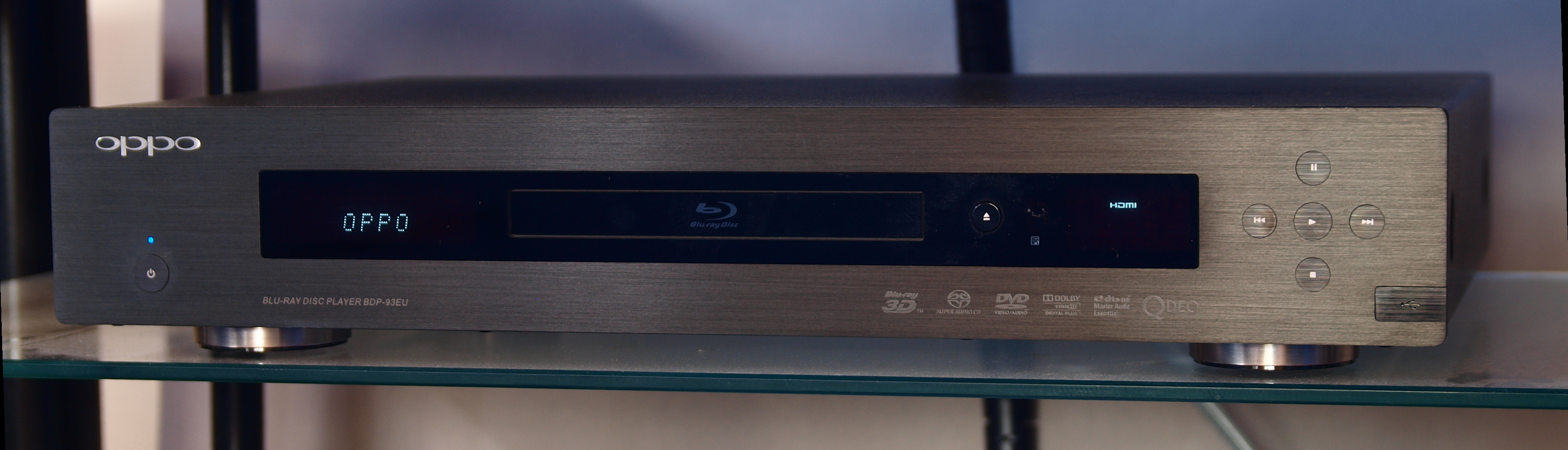
OPPO BDP-93

In 2018, OPPO discontinued production of all Blu-ray players.

== Recognition ==
It entered personal audio market in 2014. Oppo's PM-1 headphones and HA-2 portable headphone amplifier/DAC have received EISA "Best Product" awards.

== Lexicon BD-30/THX certification controversy ==
In 2010, an Audioholics.com review revealed that the chassis and internal components of Lexicon's BD-30 Blu-ray player (retail price $3500) was identical to that of the Oppo BDP-83 (retail price $500); audiovisual testing indicated no changes were made in performance either. Furthermore, it appears that this player was given THX certification (the first Blu-ray player with this distinction), despite failing fundamental THX tests. Currently, evidence of its certification has largely disappeared from the THX website after this was revealed.
