= TFT-LCD (Flat Panel) Antitrust Litigation =

United States class-action lawsuit

- Court: United States District Court for the Northern District of California
- Full case name: TFT-LCD (Flat Panel) Antitrust Litigation, U.S. District Court, Northern District of California, No. 07-md-01827.

Court membership
- Judge sitting: Susan Yvonne Illston

The TFT-LCD (Flat Panel) Antitrust Litigation was a United States class-action lawsuit regarding the worldwide conspiracy to coordinate the prices of Thin-Film Transistor-Liquid Crystal Display (TFT-LCD) panels, which are used to make laptop computers, computer monitors and televisions, between 1999 and 2006. In March 2010, Judge Susan Illston certified two nationwide classes of persons and entities that directly and indirectly purchased TFT-LCDs – for panel purchasers and purchasers of TFT-LCD integrated products; the litigation was followed by multiple suits.

== Background ==
TFT-LCDs are used in flat-panel televisions, laptop and computer monitors, mobile phones, personal digital assistants, semiconductors and other devices; in 2006, the worldwide TFT-LCD panels market generated approximately $70 billion in revenue, at least $23.5 billion of which in the U.S.

In mid-2006, the U.S. Department of Justice (DOJ) Antitrust Division requested FBI assistance in investigating LCD price-fixing. In December 2006, authorities in Japan, Korea, the European Union and the United States revealed a probe into alleged anti-competitive activity among LCD panel manufacturers.

The companies involved, which later became the Defendants, were Taiwanese companies AU Optronics (AUO), Chi Mei, Chunghwa Picture Tubes (Chunghwa), and HannStar; Korean companies LG Display and Samsung; and Japanese companies Hitachi, Sharp and Toshiba. Reports alleged an international cartel which took place between January 1, 1999, through December 31, 2006, and which was designed to illegally reduce competition and thus inflate prices for LCD panels. The companies exchanged information on future production planning, capacity use, pricing and other commercial conditions. The cartel members held monthly multilateral meetings, called "Crystal Meetings", where executives exchanged production, shipping, supply and demand information. In later stages, lower-level employees replaced top-level employees at the meetings which were moved from hotel rooms to public restaurants. An investigation by the European Commission concluded that the companies were aware they were violating competition rules, and took steps to conceal the venue and results of the meetings; a document by the conspirators requested everybody involved "to take care of security/confidentiality matters and to limit written communication".

== Litigation ==
Samsung was granted immunity by the DOJ, in exchange for cooperation and concrete evidence of LCD price-fixing.

This price-fixing scheme manipulated the playing field for businesses that abide by the rules, and left consumers to pay artificially higher costs for televisions, computers and other electronics.

— New York Attorney General Eric Schneiderman, 2011

Companies directly affected by the LCD price-fixing conspiracy, as direct victims of the cartel, were some of the largest computer, television and cellular telephone manufacturers in the world. These direct action plaintiffs included AT&T Mobility, Best Buy, Costco Wholesale Corporation, Good Guys, Kmart, Motorola Mobility, Newegg, Sears, and Target Corporation. U.S. States and Indirect-Purchaser Plaintiffs (i.e. those who purchased TFT-LCD integrated products, but not the LCDs as separate products) sought an order certifying (a) one 50-state Rule 23(b)(2)2 injunctive relief class under Section 16 of the Clayton Act (15 U.S.C. § 26) to prevent Defendants from violating Section 1 of the Sherman Act (15 U.S.C. § 1), as well as (b) 23 separate state-wide classes based on each state's antitrust/consumer protection class action law.

In November 2008, LG, Chunghwa, Hitachi, Epson, and Chi Mei pleaded guilty to criminal charges of fixing prices of TFT-LCD panels sold in the U.S. and agreed to pay criminal fines (see chart).

The South Korea Fair Trade Commission launched legal proceedings as well. It concluded that the companies involved met more than once a month and more than 200 times from September 2001 to December 2006, and imposed fines on the LCD manufacturers.

=== Fines and penalties ===
Fines imposed by US, EU and Koran authorities
Conspirator	Department of Justice Fines	European Competition Commission Fines	Korean FTC Fines
AUO	$500 million	€116.8 million	₩ 28.53 billion
LG	$400 million	€215 million	₩ 65.5 billion
Chi Mei	$220 million	€300 million	₩1.55 billion
Sharp	$120 million		
Chunghwa	$65 million	€9.02 million	₩290 million
Hitachi	$31 million		
Toshiba	$30 million		
Hannstar	$30 million	€8.1 million	₩870 million
Epson	$26 million		
Samsung		Granted immunity	₩97.29 billion

From October 2008 through January 2009, three leading flat-screen manufacturers pleaded guilty to participating in the conspiracy and were fined:

- LG ("LG Philips" at that time) was sentenced to pay a $400 million criminal fine – the second largest fine in U.S. Antitrust Division history,
- Sharp Corp. pleaded guilty to three separate conspiracies to fix the prices of TFT-LCD panels sold to Dell Inc., Apple Computer Inc. and Motorola Inc., and was sentenced to pay a $120 million criminal fine,
- Chunghwa pleaded guilty and was sentenced to pay a $65 million criminal fine for participating with LG and other unnamed co-conspirators during the five-year cartel period.

In South Korea, regulators imposed the largest fine the country had ever imposed in an international cartel case, and fined Samsung Electronics and LG Display ₩92.29 billion and ₩65.52 billion, respectively. AU Optronics was fined ₩28.53 billion, Chimmei Innolux ₩1.55 billion, Chungwa ₩290 million and HannStar ₩870 million.

Seven executives from Japanese and South Korean LCD companies were indicted in the U.S. Four were charged with participating as co-conspirators in the conspiracy and sentenced to prison terms – including LG's Vice President of Monitor Sales, Chunghwa's chairman, its chief executive officer, and its Vice President of LCD Sales – for "participating in meetings, conversations and communications in Taiwan, South Korea and the United States to discuss the prices of TFT-LCD panels; agreeing during these meetings, conversations and communications to charge prices of TFT-LCD panels at certain predetermined levels; issuing price quotations in accordance with the agreements reached; exchanging information on sales of TFT-LCD panels for the purpose of monitoring and enforcing adherence to the agreed-upon prices; and authorizing, ordering and consenting to the participation of subordinate employees in the conspiracy."

On December 8, 2010, the European Commission announced it had fined six of the LCD companies involved in a total of €648 million (Samsung Electronics received full immunity under the commission's 2002 Leniency Notice) – LG Display, AU Optronics, Chimei, Chunghwa Picture and HannStar Display Corporation.

In July 2012, AU Optronics was fined $500 million, and two of AUO's executives were sentenced to prison time and a $200,000 criminal fine.

On July 3, 2012, a U.S. federal jury ruled that the remaining defendant, Toshiba Corporation, which denied any wrongdoing, participated in the conspiracy to fix prices of TFT-LCDs and returned a verdict in favor of the plaintiff class. Following the trial, Toshiba agreed to resolve the case by paying the class $30 million.

=== Civil class litigation outcome ===
On March 29, 2013, Judge Susan Illston issued final approval of the settlements agreements totaling $1.1 billion for the indirect purchaser’ class. The settling companies also agreed to establish antitrust compliance programs and to help prosecute other defendants, and cooperate with the Justice Department's continuing investigation. Some of the money from the settlement was to be made available to consumers in 24 states. In the U.S. and other countries, private class action suits were filed seeking damages for companies that purchased flat-panel screens (direct purchasers/victims), and for consumers who bought TFT-LCD integrated products (indirect purchasers/victims).

== See also ==
- List of class-action lawsuits
