= Audioholics =

A/V reviews and forum website

- Website type: Review site Internet forum
- Available in: English
- Headquarters: Tampa, Florida
- Owners: Gene DellaSala and Berta DellaSala
- Founder: Gene DellaSala
- Editors: Theo Nicolakis, James Larson, Wayde Robson, Tony Leotta, Jacob Green
- Key people: Tony Leotta, Don Dunn, Matthew Poes
- Website: www.audioholics.com
- Registration: Optional
- Launched: 1999; 27 years ago

Audioholics is an audio/video (A/V) and home theater technology review site and Internet forum. The website publishes detailed technical reviews of commercial audio, video and other electronics equipment.

Product of the Year Awards is Audioholics' awards program, highlighting staff picks for the best products reviewed each year. Winners are chosen each December and are announced in the annual Product of the Year Awards feature on the site.

== History ==
Audioholics was founded by Gene DellaSala in 1999. DellaSala says the website was born after being frustrated with dishonest hardware specifications from certain manufacturers. Gene takes more of a "real world" approach to audio/video (A/V) performance reviews, with an emphasis on educating consumers. In the decade since 1999, Audioholics.com grew from an A/V hobby website to the world's most trafficked home theater audio and video website, with over 1.2 million monthly readers. Audioholics also maintains the largest and most engaged social media presence in the AV Industry with over 100k active subscribers on their Facebook page reaching over 600k people/mo and over 170k YouTube subscribers with over 1 million minutes/mo watched on their myth busting, how-to and product review videos. The combined reach of ALL the Audioholics properties is > 2 million readers/mo.

In 2003, Audioholics hired a web developer to migrate the site into a content management system and frame it into the website we know today. During this time, Audioholics' traffic began to grow. The Audioholics AV magazine began increasing the amount of both industry news and product reviews, and expanded its reviewer staff and site-wide content rapidly.

By 2006, Audioholics had become one of the most widely read home theater publication and had added more writing staff, which allowed the site to expand content into consumer electronics industry news and often-colorful editorial. That same year, Forbes Magazine rated Audioholics.com the best A/V publication online or in print.

== Critical reception ==
Audioholics has been both praised and criticized for its skeptical approach to consumer hi-fi reviews. Avoiding concepts such as what it calls myths in audio, Audioholics has instead carved a niche for itself by relying on measurable, reproducible data to review audio / video equipment against manufacturer product specifications.

Audioholics had been known for debunking myths on interconnects and speaker wire, and the website famously drew the ire of Monster Cable with criticisms about the company's claims and business practices. The website's investigative reports uncovered a cloned Blu-ray player from Lexicon, and was the first to draw a link between 3D HTDV and the shelving of the Sega VR headsets in the 90s due to safety concerns for children.

== Audioholics store ==
In 2007 Audioholics announced a partnership with Woodland Venture Capital funded by Bob Pozen, former CEO / Founder of Fidelity Investments, to launch an online storefront. Audioholics disclosed how this storefront would operate as a completely separate business entity from the editorial site. The site faced some criticism for perceived conflicts of interest in supporting a retail store and partnerships with advertisers.

As of April 11, 2013, Audioholics announced the licensing agreement of their name was over and the store was moved and rebranded as Audiogurus.com There has been no further affiliation between the two entities, despite the fact that Audiogurus to this day still attempts to use the Audioholics trademarked name.
