= Raindirk Audio =

Raindirk Audio Ltd
- Type: Private limited Reg No to follow
- Industry: Mixing consoles Studio hardware
- Founded: 1973
- Headquarters: Long Sutton,
- Website: www.raindirk.com

Raindirk Audio Ltd is a manufacturer of high-end, pro-audio equipment used in both recording studios and live sound reproduction. The company was founded in 1973. Raindirk's first console was sold to former Deep Purple singer Ian Gillan's Kingsway Studios. All products are designed by Cyril Jones.

While not as high a profile as competitors like Solid State Logic, API and AMS Neve, Raindirk consoles have been used on artists as diverse as Pavarotti and Max Bygraves.

== Competitors ==
Historically, Raindirk has produced high-end, large-format, professional recording studio consoles. As such their main competitors have been: Neve, API, Euphonix, Harrison, Solid State Logic, Studer, and AMEK (no longer manufactured).

However, in recent years Raindirk has focussed on high-end live sound applications. A recent development has been the design of high specification DI boxes and microphone pre-amps for use in DAW studios.
