= Rupert Neve =

British-American electronics engineer and entrepreneur (1926–2021)

- Neve in a recording studio in 2009
- Born: Arthur Rupert Neve; 31 July 1926; Newton Abbot, England
- Died: 12 February 2021 (aged 94); Wimberley, Texas, United States
- Occupations: Entrepreneur; audio engineer
- Known for: Designing recording and audio mixing equipment
- Awards: Grammy Award for Lifetime Achievement (1997)

Signature
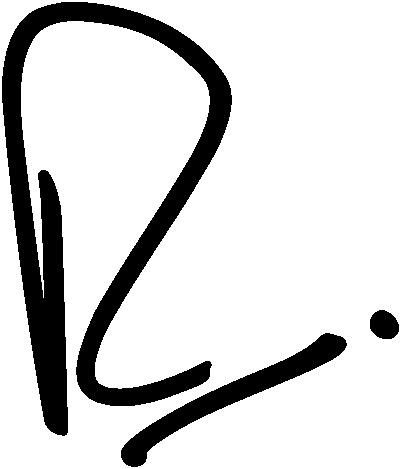

Arthur Rupert Neve (31 July 1926 – 12 February 2021) was a British-American electronics engineer and entrepreneur, who was a pioneering designer of professional audio recording equipment. He designed analog recording and audio mixing equipment that was sought after by professional musicians and recording technicians. His customers included the music groups the Beatles, Aerosmith and Nirvana, and the recording studios Sound City Studios and Abbey Road Studios. Companies that he was associated with included Neve Electronics, Focusrite, AMS Neve, and Rupert Neve Designs.

He received a Technical Grammy Award for lifetime achievement in 1997.

== Early life ==
Arthur Rupert Neve was born on 31 July 1926 in Newton Abbot, England. He spent much of his early childhood in Buenos Aires, Argentina, where his father was a missionary with the British and Foreign Bible Society. He began designing audio amplifiers and radio receivers from age 13. The start of World War II increased demand for radios and Neve began repairing and selling radios. At 17 years of age, he served in World War II, and was a member of the Army's Royal Corps of Signals.

== Career ==
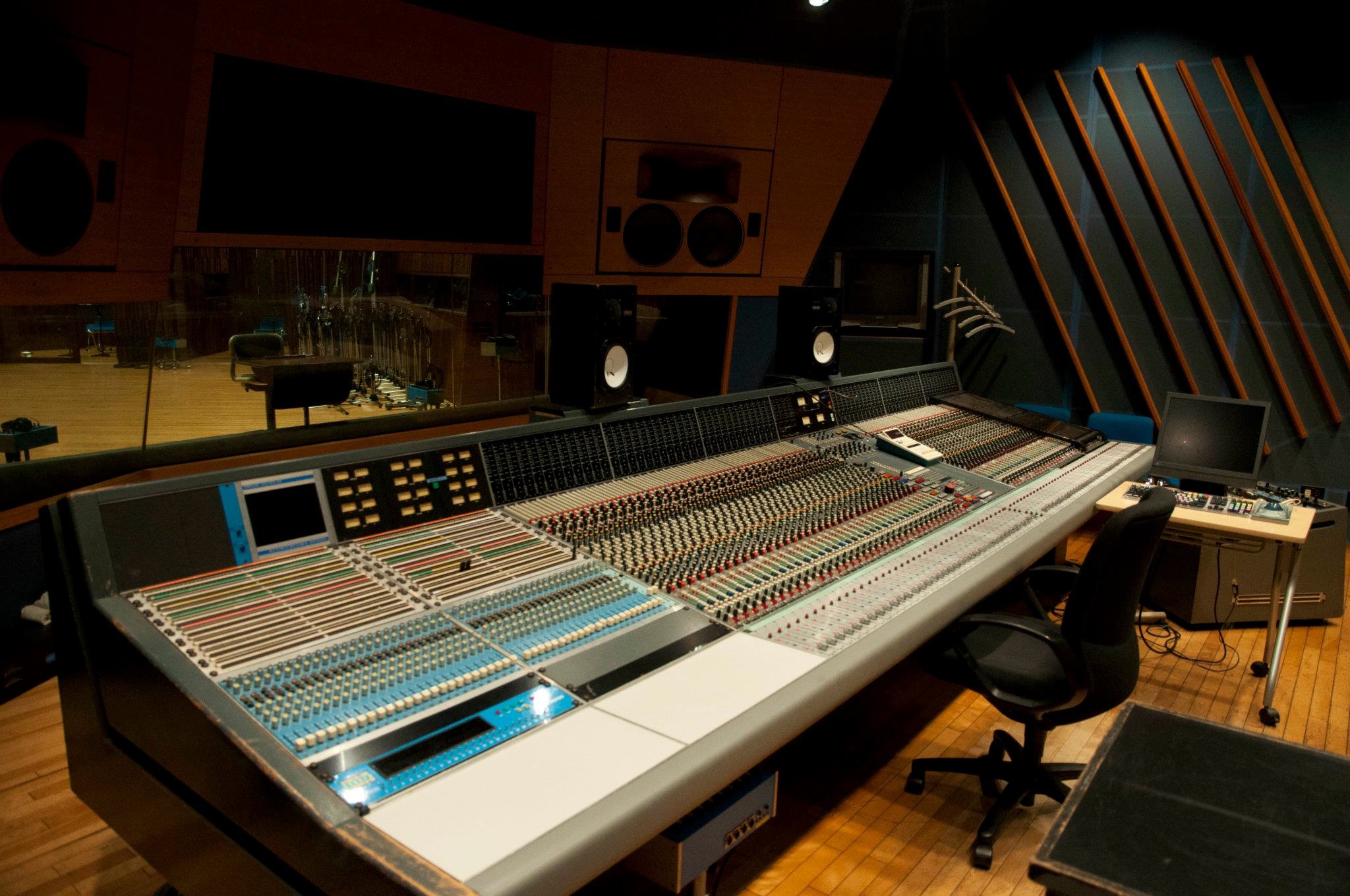
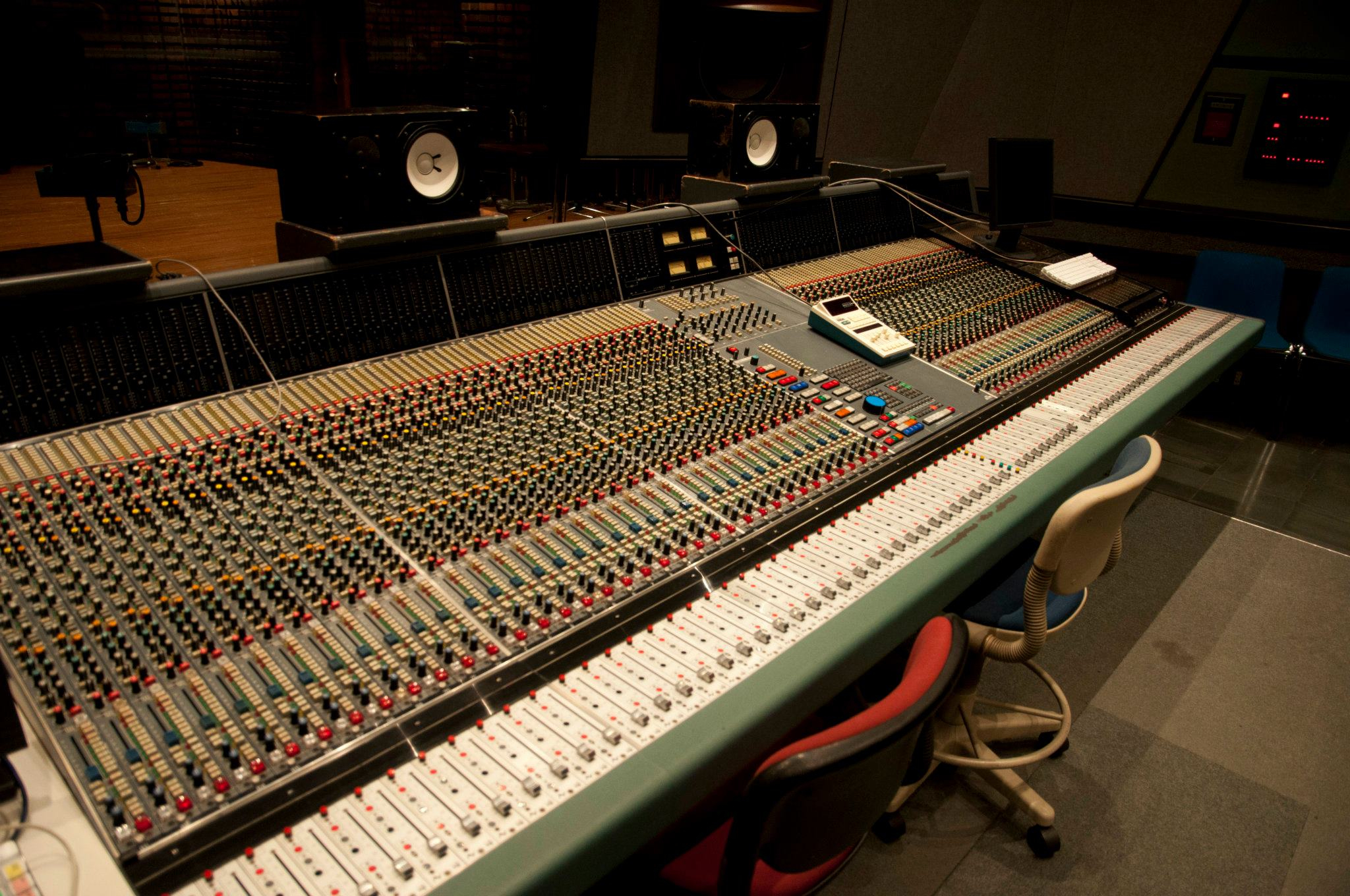
Neve VR-72 with Flying Faders

Neve began his career after the war as a designer of public address systems, and recorded speakers and singers on lacquer discs, including recording running address systems and recording prime minister Winston Churchill's speeches in the 1940s and distributing their recordings to radio stations for broadcast. He provided the public address systems for Queen Elizabeth, then a princess, at the opening of the St Andrew's Church, Plymouth, which had been rebuilt after being destroyed in the Blitz.

He worked in the 1950s with Rediffusion, a forerunner of early cable TV systems. Neve left the company, and formed CQ Audio, a company specialising in the manufacture of hifi speaker systems. In 1961, he formed Neve Electronics, and began designing and building mixing consoles for recording studios. He started out by designing and building a mixing console for composer Desmond Leslie, from Castle Leslie, Ireland, where the original desk is still housed. He built a transistor-based mixing console with an equalizer for Philips Studio in London in 1964. One of his customers during this period was the Beatles and their producer George Martin. He sold his company Neve Electronics and worked with Manchester-based Amtek Systems in 1975. During the 1970s, he designed a training program for missionaries to use radio broadcasting equipment.

Neve worked on microphone preamplifiers, equalizers, compressors and early large format mixing consoles. Many of his long discontinued products are considered classic equipment and are sought after by the professionals in the recording industry. This has resulted in several companies releasing products that are Neve replicas or clones. He is often credited for designing the modern recording console. In 1989, he was inducted into the Mix Hall of Fame, and in 1997 he was the third person to receive a Technical Grammy Award for lifetime accomplishment. In a 1999 survey conducted by Studio Sound magazine he was selected by his peers as the number one audio personality of the 20th century. Dave Grohl interviewed Neve for the 2013 documentary Sound City, a documentary about the recording studio of the same name. Some of his customers included music groups Aerosmith, Nirvana, and recording studio Abbey Road Studios in addition to Sound City Studios.

=== Associated companies ===
==== Neve and AMS Neve ====
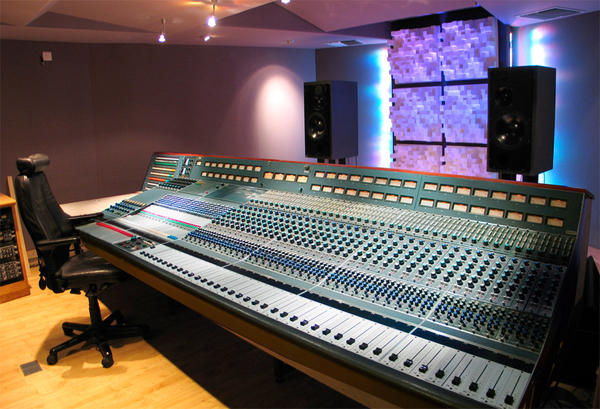
Neve 8078

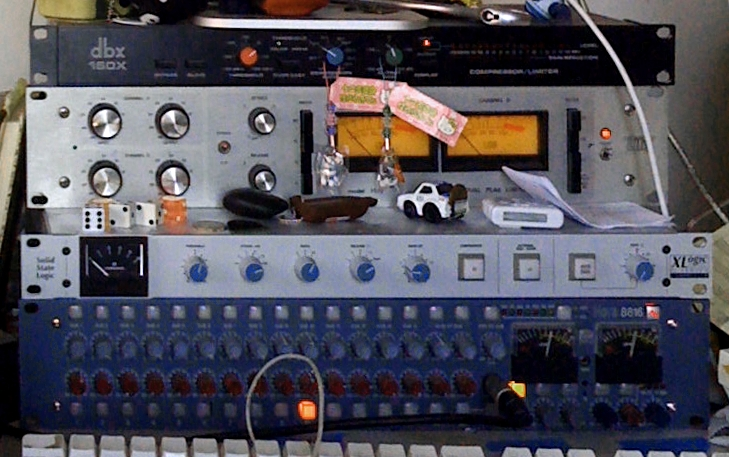
AMS Neve 8816 Summing Mixer (bottom)

Neve's first company was a manufacturer of high-end recording consoles in England. It operated out of Neve's home at first, and moved to its own premises in the late 1960s. It was sold in 1973 to Bonochord Group of companies and Rupert Neve left the company in 1975. As a condition of the sale Neve signed a 10-year non-compete agreement. The original Neve group was sold to Siemens in 1985. Siemens then merged Neve with another UK audio console manufacturer AMS (Advanced Music Systems) and formed AMS Neve. The company was later sold to Tom Misner of the School of Audio Engineering.

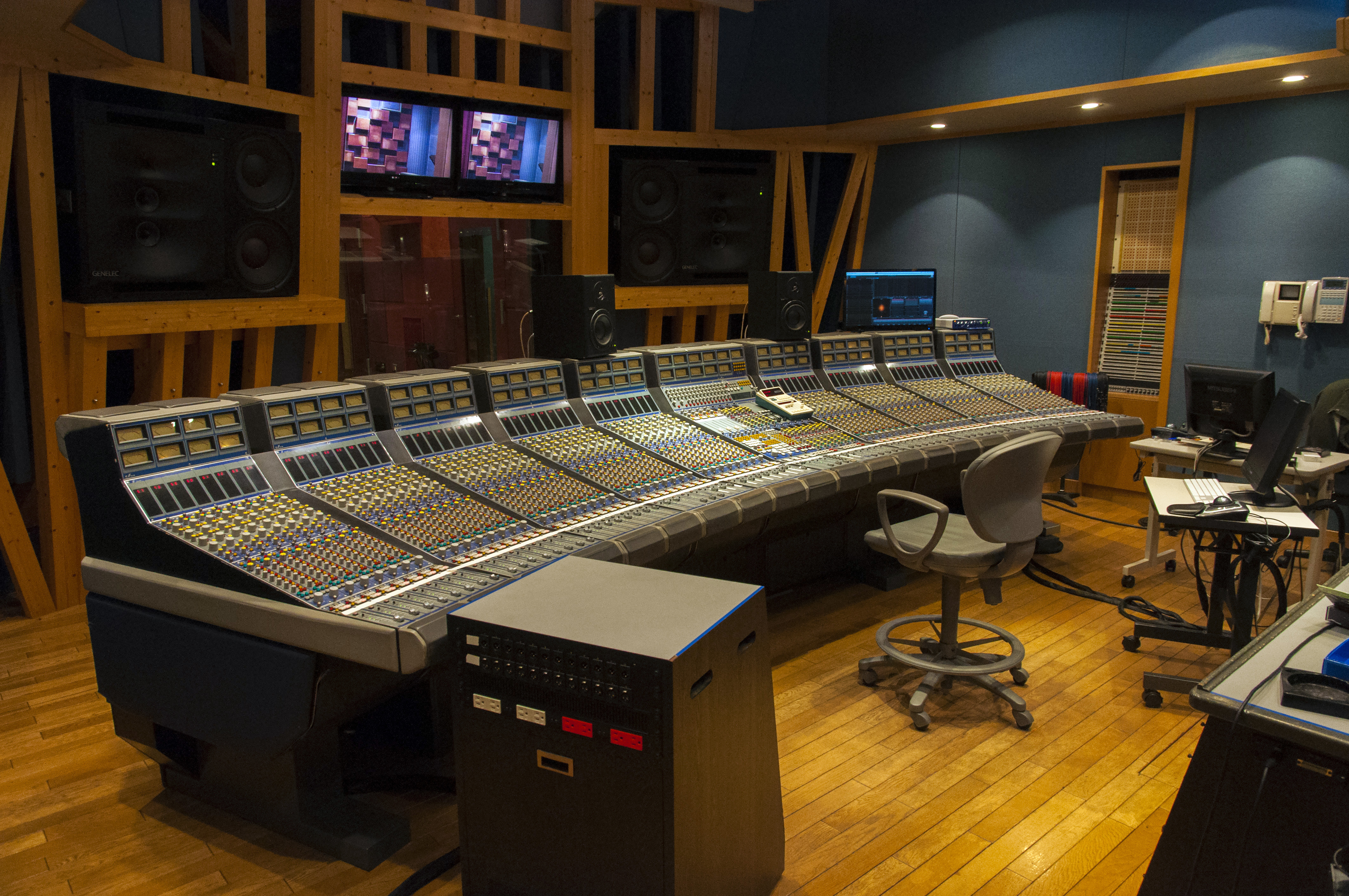
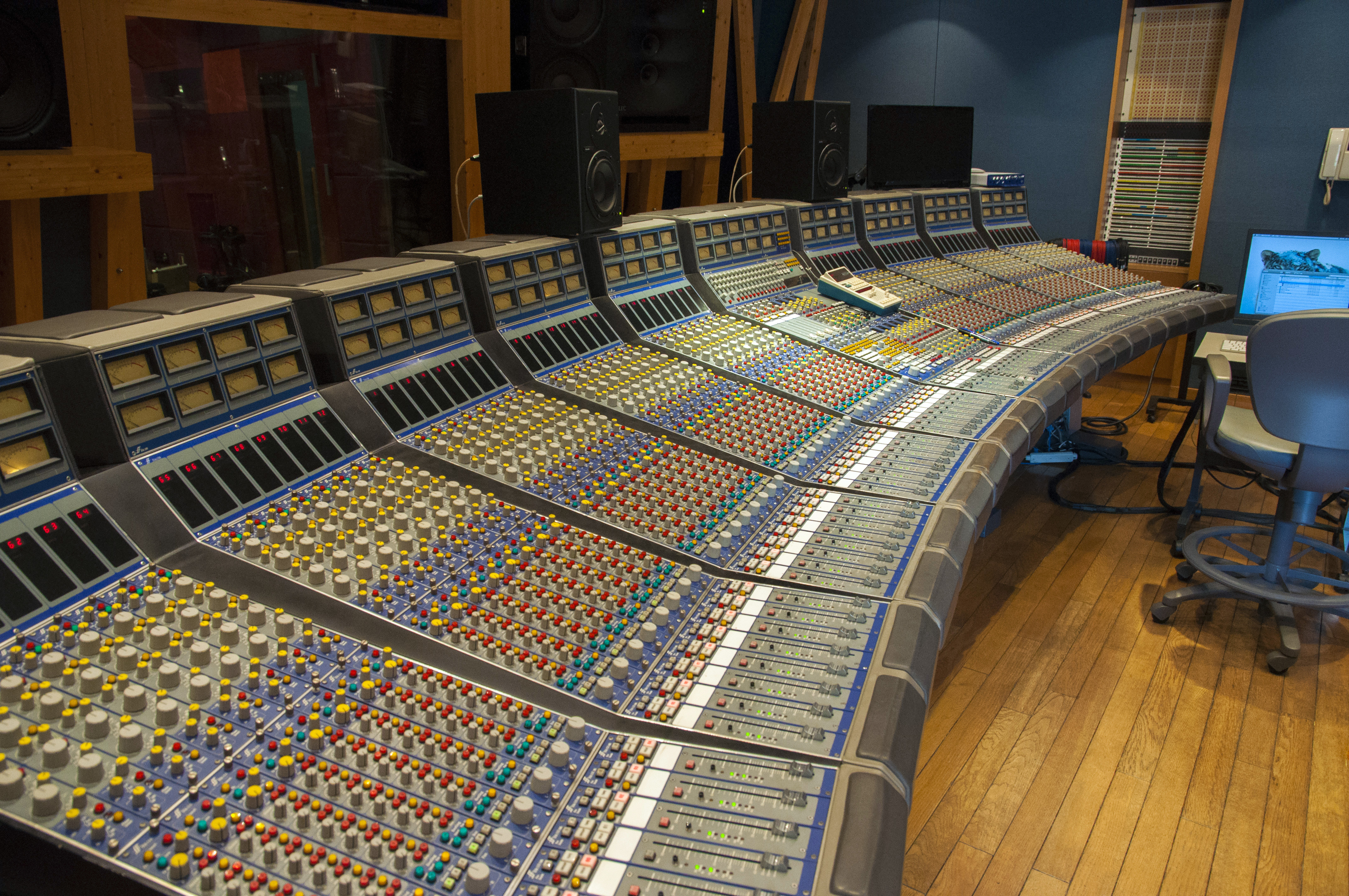
Focusrite Console 72in 48out with GML Fader Automation

==== Focusrite ====
Focusrite was founded by Neve with his wife Evelyn. The company manufactured equalizers, processors, and amplifiers. The company made rack-mounted recording equipment, outboard gear, dynamic processors, and equalizers. The company was liquidated in 1989. Phil Dudderidge, who incorporated a new company, Focusrite Audio Engineering Ltd, bought the assets of the company.

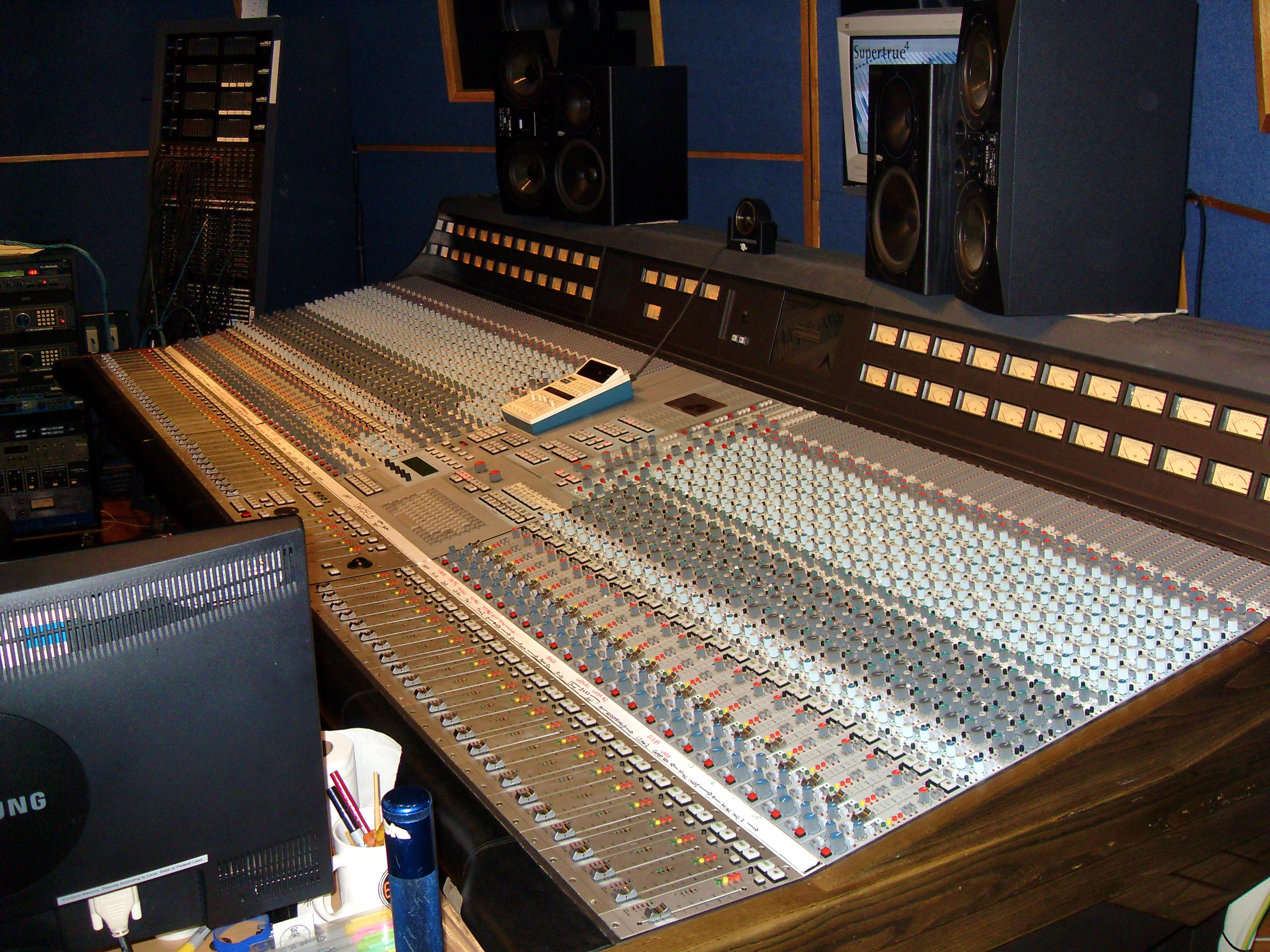
Amek 9098i

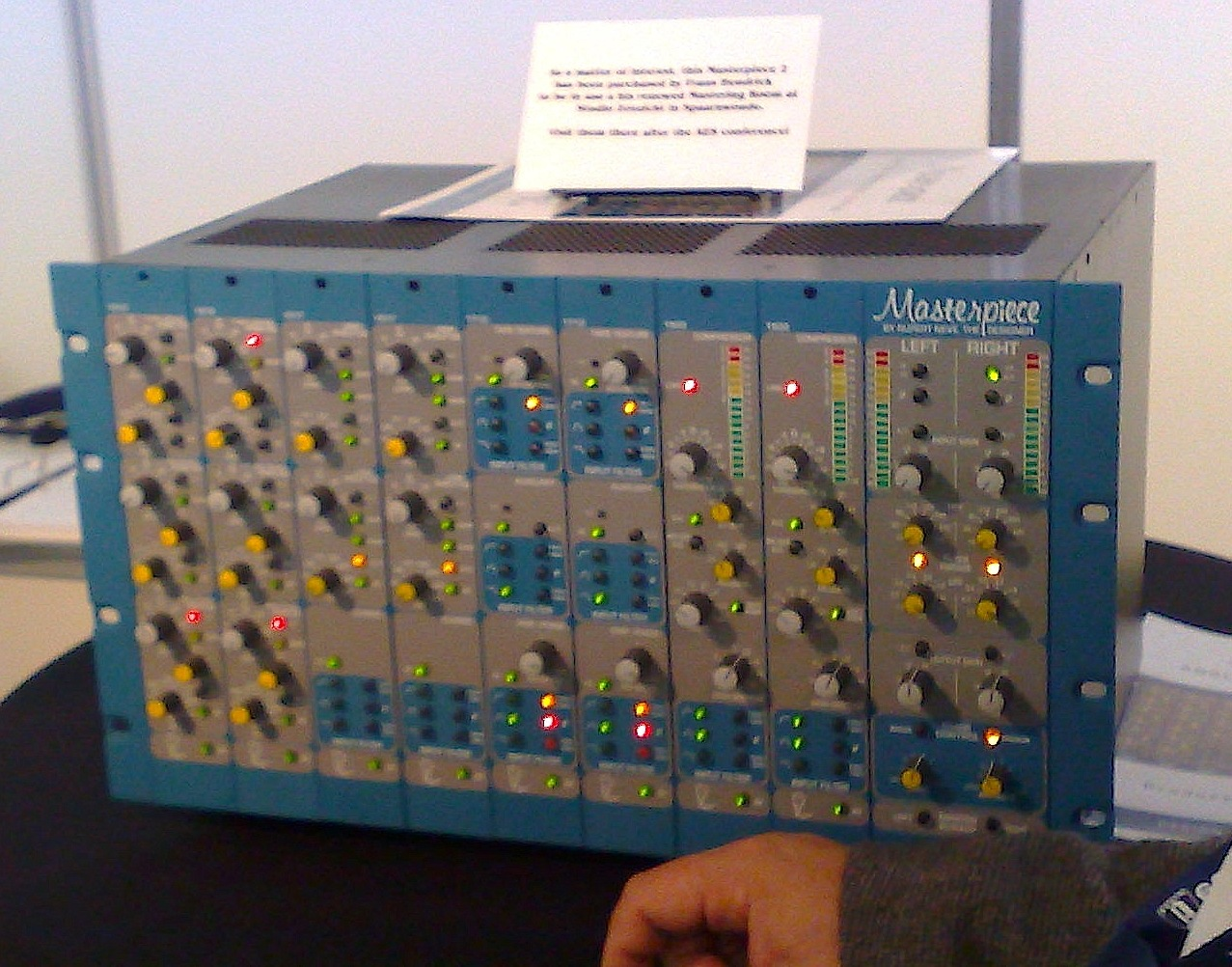
Legendary Audio Masterpiece

==== ARN Consultants ====
Neve started ARN Consultants, a consulting firm, with his wife in 1975, during a period of non-compete agreement with Neve Electronics. In 1989, the firm partnered with Amek Systems design a range of outboard equipment and consoles. ARN consultants also helped design the ES pickup system for Taylor's acoustic guitars. Rupert also designed the K4 preamplifier for Taylor. ARN Consultants also designed the two-channel mastering box, called the Masterpiece, for Legendary Audio.

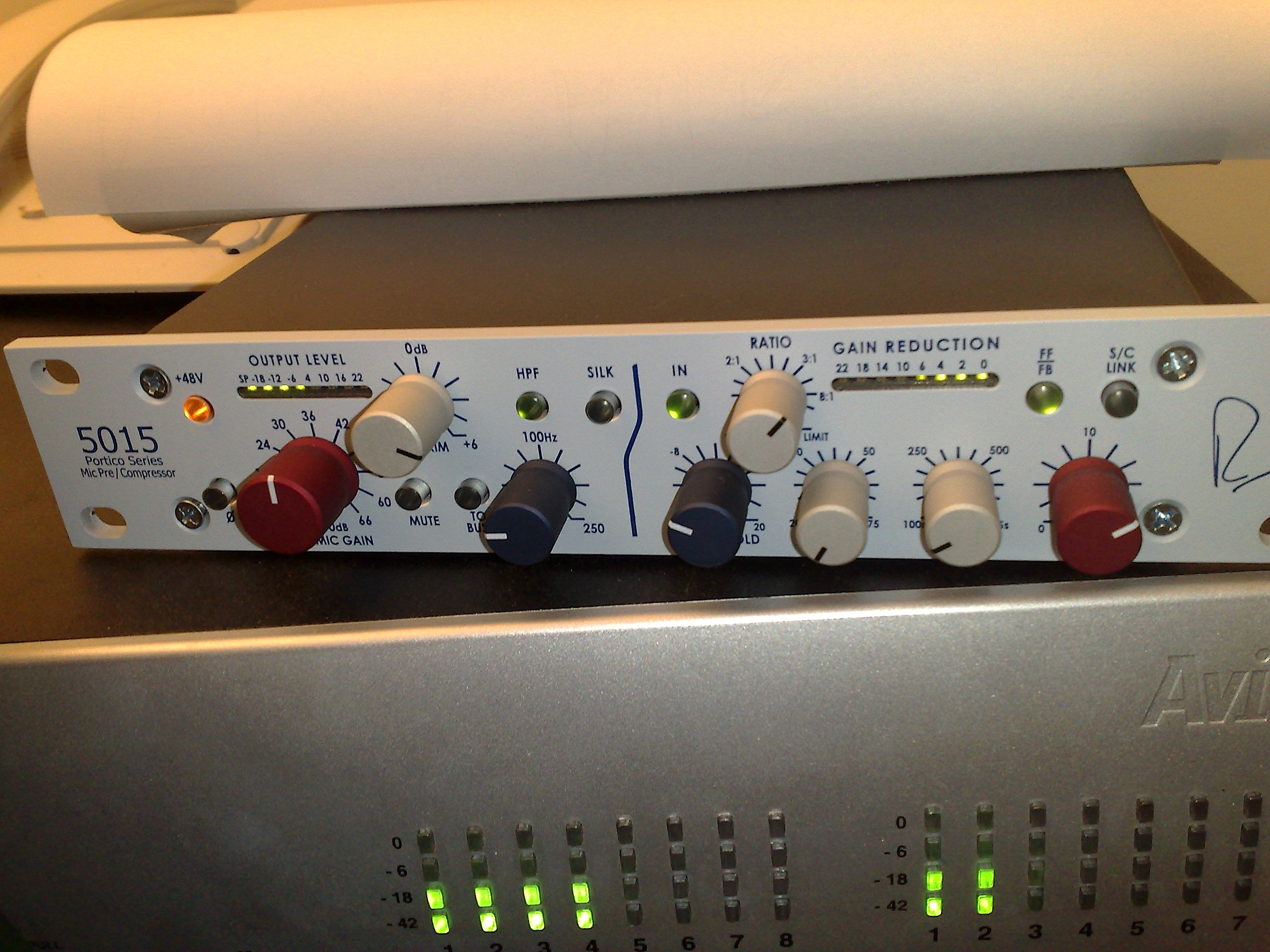
Rupert Neve Designs Portico 5015 Mic Pre Compressor

==== Rupert Neve Designs ====
Neve established Rupert Neve Designs in 2005, to market a variety of microphone preamplifiers, equalizers, compressors, and other recording equipment. The company entered the project studio market with its Portico series, which enabled modular mixing and recording components. The company also manufactures a line mixer, the 5088. The company won multiple TEC Awards in recognition for their product innovation.

Neve partnered with sE Electronics in 2008, to design the Rupert Neve Signature Series of microphones. By April 2015, three models had been introduced: the RNR1 active ribbon microphone, the RN17 small-diaphragm condenser microphone, and the RNT large-diaphragm vacuum tube condenser microphone.

== Personal life and death ==
Neve was married to his wife, Evelyn, for nearly 70 years until his death. The couple had five children and moved to Wimberley, Texas, United States, in 1994, and became U.S. citizens in 2002. Neve was a devout Christian.

Neve died on 12 February 2021 in Wimberley due to pneumonia and heart failure. He was aged 94.
