= Focusrite =

British audio equipment company

Focusrite plc.
- Company type: Audio Equipment Manufacturer
- Industry: Electronics, Professional Audio
- Founded: 1985; 41 years ago
- Founder: Rupert Neve
- Headquarters: Artisan, Hillbottom Road, High Wycombe, Buckinghamshire, England
- Key people: Phil Dudderidge
- Products: Vocaster
- Divisions: Focusrite; Focusrite Pro; Ampify Music; Optimal Audio
- Subsidiaries: Focusrite Audio Engineering Limited (with subsidiaries Focusrite Novation Inc and Focusrite Novation Asia Limited); ADAM Audio GmbH; Martin Audio Limited; Novation; Sequential
- Website: focusriteplc.com; focusrite.com; pro.focusrite.com; adam-audio.com; martin-audio.com; novationmusic.com; ampifymusic.com

Focusrite PLC is an English music and audio products group based in High Wycombe, England (with its history in Focusrite Audio Engineering Ltd.). The Focusrite Group trades under eight brands: Focusrite, Focusrite Pro, Martin Audio, ADAM Audio, Novation, Ampify Music, Optimal Audio and Sequential. Focusrite designs and markets audio interfaces, microphone preamps, consoles, analogue equalizers (EQ) and channel strips, and digital audio processing hardware and software for professional and home studios.

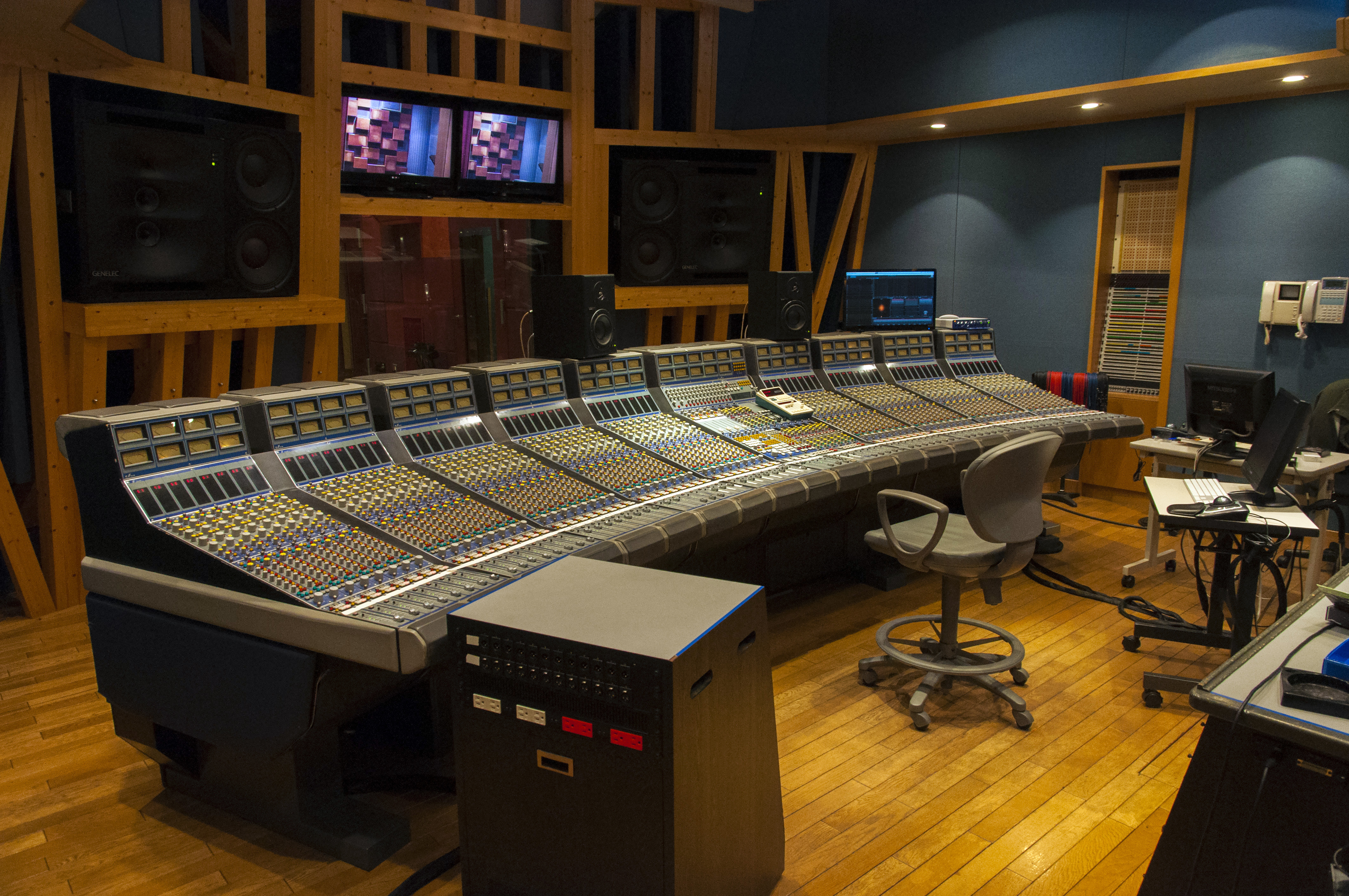
Focusrite Console 72in 48out with GML Fader Automation @ CRESCENTE STUDIO, Setagaya Tokyo Japan

== History ==
Founded in 1985 by Rupert Neve, Focusrite's first contracts included a commission from George Martin to build extensions to AIR Studios' custom Neve consoles, initially the vintage recording console in Martin's AIR Montserrat studio in the Caribbean – specifically a microphone preamplifier and equaliser.

Audio industry entrepreneur and co-founder of Soundcraft Electronics Ltd, Phil Dudderidge purchased the company's assets in April 1989, establishing Focusrite Audio Engineering Ltd and reissuing the original modules along with some new designs. The company also designed a new console, the Focusrite Studio Console, released in 1990.

In August 2004, Focusrite acquired electronic instrument manufacturer Novation which became a subsidiary called Novation Digital Music Systems Ltd.

On 12 December 2014, Focusrite was floated on the AIM market as Focusrite plc.

In July 2019, Focusrite acquired monitor speaker manufacturer ADAM Audio, and in December 2019 acquired Martin Audio who manufacture loudspeaker systems for sound reinforcement.

In April 2021, Focusrite acquired Sequential, a designer of analogue synthesizers.

In March 2022, Focusrite acquired the UK audio equipment maker Linea Research Holdings for £12.6 million.
