= Graham Blyth =

English audio engineer (1948–2024)

- Born: 22 March 1948; Chessington, Surrey, England
- Died: 22 October 2024 (aged 76)
- Genres: Rock and classical music
- Occupations: Audio design engineer, organist, conductor
- Instruments: Pipe organ, electronic organ, piano, harpsichord
- Label: Harvest

Graham Blyth (22 March 1948 – 22 October 2024) was an English audio engineer, known for designing mixing consoles. He co-founded Soundcraft, a manufacturer which Blyth helped form into a world leader in sound reinforcement and recording mixers, establishing the "British sound". After succeeding in electrical engineering he became a professional organist, performing on pipe organs around the world. Blyth was a Fellow of both the Royal Society of Arts (RSA) and the Audio Engineering Society (AES). In 2012, he was awarded an honorary doctorate degree in science from the University of Hertfordshire.

== Early life ==
Blyth was born in Chessington 22 March 1948; his father was an architect and his mother a teacher and painter. He was schooled from an early age in Epsom, Surrey, England. He began studying the piano at the age of four years, and in his teens worked to gain a scholarship to Trinity College of Music in London. There, he learned the play the organ, then transferred to the University of Bristol in 1966 to study electronic engineering, a decision made easier because he was "hopelessly infatuated with an astonishingly pretty girl from my social group at home who'd gone up the year before." At Bristol, Blyth founded the Student Music Society, and studied orchestra conducting; as a senior he conducted a performance of Bach's complex masterpiece St Matthew Passion. After college, he obtained a position with the Compton Organ Company in their research department where he met Bill Kelsey, his early mentor, who showed him how to lay out circuits on printed circuit boards. Compton was "on its last legs", according to Blyth, and he left to join Graseby Instruments where he designed electronic filters for underwater weapons to satisfy Admiralty contracts. Blyth spent evenings at Kelsey's Notting Hill flat helping him assemble a large mixing desk, one used by Emerson, Lake & Palmer at the "legendary" Isle of Wight Festival 1970. With this success, Kelsey left Compton to form with a business partner the professional audio equipment company Kelsey & Morris.

== Audio engineering ==
In early 1971, Blyth formally joined Kelsey & Morris, where he assisted in designing and fabricating mixing consoles and loudspeakers for bands such as T. Rex, Ten Years After and King Crimson. After learning the basics of mixing console electronics, he joined Paul Dobson and Phil Dudderidge who had formed Rotary Speaker Developments (RSD), a company that built custom public address systems for bands such as Roy Wood's Wizzard, and Steve Harley & Cockney Rebel. RSD made their own mixing consoles derived from a design by Bill Kelsey. In September 1973, Dudderidge and Blyth formed Soundcraft Electronics, Ltd., based at Fender Soundhouse on Tottenham Court Road in London, "right in the middle of everything." Soundcraft was the first company to build a mixing console into a road case: the Series 1S, which was built by Blyth and the musicians in the band Rinky Dink and the Crystal Set, who brought Blyth into the band as keyboardist. The mixer debuted in 1974 and soon became a "hit" with UK bands, establishing the "British sound" of audio equipment.

In 2004, Dudderidge described Blyth as being focused on customer needs through the 1970s and '80s, interested in designing mixing consoles to fit: "I vividly remember lunch meetings with Albert Leccese of Audio Analysts where Graham would start designing stuff with Albert on cocktail napkins; there was a terrific synergy between them ... and the things we worked on with Tom Schlum and Mick Whelan of Electrotec prior to that were just as exciting. We produced a custom board (in a light blue frame with shiny aluminium end cheeks!) for them that eventually went on to join our inventory as the Series 4."

Beginning in 1972, Blyth and Dudderidge teamed with Roger Lindsay to form Europa Concert Systems, a live sound company that catered to American bands touring Europe. In 1991, Soundcraft debuted the Europa mixing console, a large-format desk for concert halls and tours.

Blyth's leadership was significant in the design of a wide variety of Soundcraft mixers which established the British EQ sound, including the Series 1S and the 1624 which became the 2400 in 1982, one of Blyth's favourite projects. In 1988, Soundcraft was sold to Harman International Industries. Dudderidge left within the year, but Blyth stayed to serve Harman as product designer and was responsible in 1991 for creating the "affordable" Spirit-by-Soundcraft line of mixers which sold more than 120,000 units by 1995. An estimated six million of Blyth's microphone preamplifier circuits were produced by Soundcraft from 1973 to 1997.

At Soundcraft, Blyth led the design of the original Series 4 mixing console, the S8000, the MH4 and MH2, the Series Two, and the GB series (named for Blyth's initials, not "Great Britain") which carries his signature on the optional meter bridge. He designed the Soundcraft Notepad, "a bit of a cult product" which is a small and "elegant" mixer. The Soundcraft GB30 microphone preamplifier circuit is a successful Blyth design used on many of Soundcraft's mixers, including the FX model lines which include digital reverberation effects by Lexicon, a sister company within Harman.

As early as 1982, when the Compact Disc was introduced, Blyth researched the possibilities of creating a digital mixing console. He told Billboard magazine that Soundcraft would not be "leaping into digital in the way that Neve has done. I think they have gone too far, too quickly. ... We are looking at the digital control of analog functions as the first step in that direction." Picking up the pace in the 2000s, Blyth, together with Product Manager Andy Brown, created the Soundcraft Vi6, a digital mixer intended for sound reinforcement applications, released mid-2006. Its interface was a development of Vistonics, a broadcast and studio mixing concept from Harman-owned Studer combined with a digital effects package from Lexicon. Regarding digital audio equipment, Blyth voiced the opinion that "companies that take great care over their analog stages, use the best internal digital format and write the best DSP code end up with the best sounding product." He said that he has "strong views on the whole subject of digital consoles, which could fill an article with mostly purple prose", but he notes that "best-in-class analog product these days is truly excellent, but so is digital." Blyth served for years as technical director at Soundcraft Studer's design offices at Potters Bar, 29 km (18 mi) north of London.

In 2006, Blyth became a Fellow in the RSA. In October 2007, Blyth was named a Fellow of the AES. Blyth reported that he was "surprised and delighted" upon learning that he was to be so honoured, especially considering that he had "never presented any papers on my subject". He said his success in designing mixing consoles stemmed more from "having green fingers and a very inquiring mind than any structured research process". In November 2012, Blyth was honoured with a Doctor of Science degree from University of Hertfordshire, in recognition of his audio engineering innovations which advanced the field of mixing console design.

== Organist ==
Blyth worked off-hours as a keyboardist in the early 1970s. While with Kelsey, he played pipe organ during a break in a Quintessence Christmas show at the Royal Albert Hall. Also a rock musician, he played electronic keyboards with Rinky Dink and the Crystal Set, a band signed to EMI Harvest Records in 1973. With its synthesizer- and drum machine-based texture, the band was recorded by John Leckie at Abbey Road Studios in 1975, releasing an LP record (Cameo Roles) and a 45 rpm single ("Can't Get Used To Losing You"), but they did not sell well. Focusing on his career as an electrical engineer and company founder, Blyth set public performing aside.

At age 38, Blyth revived his interest in keyboard performance, returning to school to pick up performance diplomas from the Royal College of Music, and his former alma mater, Trinity College of Music. He performed a piano recital at Whitfield Street Studios in 1988 for his 40th birthday. He joined the Royal College of Organists, an organisation for the promotion of organ and choral music. Following a pipe organ concert given for AES convention-goers in New York City in 1993 at St. Thomas Church, Blyth played regularly for the AES. He played at the Brick Presbyterian Church, the Church of Saint Mary the Virgin and St. Patrick's Cathedral in New York City, the Église de la Madeleine in Paris, the Jesuit Church, Vienna, the Dom zu unserer lieben Frau in Munich, the Temple Church in London, the Cathedral of Our Lady of the Angels in Los Angeles, and at Grace Cathedral and the Cathedral of Saint Mary of the Assumption in San Francisco.

Blyth consulted for organ builders such as Saville Organ Company and helped tune organ installations. In the 2000s he picked up an interest in "classical" digital electronic organs, using the Musicom system. He became president and tonal director of the Veritas Organ Company.

== Personal life and death ==
Based at his home in Challow Park just west of Wantage, Oxfordshire, where he lived from 1984, he directed local concerts and music festivals. In 1996 as an addition to his house, he built the Challow Park Recital Hall, a venue for organ recitals or chamber ensembles, suitable for public performances or recording. The 80-seat hall uses a LARES electro-acoustic enhancement system to supply pre-programmed room acoustics settings, a "technology that allows it to be an acoustical chameleon."

The father of three children, Blyth played organ, piano and harpsichord, and he conducted musical ensembles. He owned a Fazioli piano, a Veritas electronic organ of his own design, and a harpsichord built by John Horniblow.

Blyth died on 22 October 2024, at the age of 76.
