= Helios (mixing console) =

British mixing console

Helios was a brand of mixing consoles custom-designed and built for use in recording studios. Produced from 1969 to 1979, Helios consoles were utilized by many key recording studios to produce numerous notable recordings and played a vital part in the history of British rock.

== History ==
=== Background ===
Richard "Dick" Swettenham was a British technician and engineer who was the Technical Director at Olympic Studios in the 1960s, where he designed and custom-built the studios' innovative wraparound mixing consoles. In 1968, when Island Records wanted a mixing console for the company's new Basing Street Studios, Glyn Johns persuaded Swettenham to leave Olympic Studios and partner with Island Records founder Chris Blackwell to start his own mixing console manufacturing company, and Helios Electronics was established in 1969.

10 years later, in 1979, Helios Electronics ceased operations. Helios founder Swettenham died of cancer on April 9, 2000.

=== Console design ===
Like their predecessors at Olympic Studios, Helios mixing consoles feature a wraparound design with console sections positioned at a much higher angle, putting controls easier for the engineer to reach than traditional console designs. Some Helios consoles also featured flattering mic preamps with Lustraphone transformers and characteristic 3-band EQ.

=== Helios consoles ===
The first Helios mixing console was commissioned by Keith Grant for Olympic Studios' new Studio Two in 1969, where the console was used to record projects by Jimi Hendrix, Procol Harum, Led Zeppelin, Traffic, the Rolling Stones, Eric Clapton and others.

Also in 1969, Island Records commissioned a 20-input, 8-bus Helios console with 16-channel monitoring for their new Basing Street Studios, where the console was used to record Black Sabbath, Jethro Tull, Genesis, Bob Marley & the Wailers, Dire Straits, and the Led Zeppelin album Led Zeppelin IV, including "Black Dog" and "Stairway to Heaven".

In the mid- to late-'70s, Richard Branson commissioned Helios consoles for Virgin Records' recording studios The Manor, The Manor Mobile, and The Town House. The initial Manor Mobile Helios console outfitted the world's first purpose-designed 24-track mobile recording studio, its 24 inputs later expanded to 40 inputs with the use of additional Helios submixers. The Town House studios opened with a 40-input Helios console with Allison automation, which remained in use at the studio until 1984. A quad-ready 32-input Helios console with Allison automation was part of Virgin's 1975 refurbishment of The Manor studios, where it remained in use through late 1981.

Helios consoles were popular with artists building their own recording studios in the 1970s, including the Beatles Apple Studios, Eric Clapton, Ian Anderson of Jethro Tull's Maison Rouge Mobile, and 10cc's Strawberry Studios.

The Who originally outfitted their Ramport Studios with a 32-input Helios console, which was replaced by a Neve console in 1976. In 1985, after Ramport was purchased by Virgin Records and renamed Townhouse 3, the studio received The Town House Studio 1's Helios console, which remained in use until 1988.

When the Rolling Stones designed their Mobile Studio in the late '60s, they commissioned Swettenham's company to build a Helios console. The RSM would go on to record most of Led Zeppelin's Led Zeppelin III (1970) and Led Zeppelin IV (1971), much of the Rolling Stones' Sticky Fingers (1971) and Exile on Main St. (1972), as well as the Stones' 1969 Hyde Park concert. During the making of the sixth Deep Purple album, Machine Head, the Mobile nearly caught fire as it stood next to the Montreux Casino in Switzerland, which was set ablaze during a Frank Zappa concert. This incident became the inspiration behind Deep Purple's most famous song, "Smoke on the Water", which mentioned the Mobile in the lyrics ("We all came out to Montreux ... to make records with a mobile") and later referred to the Mobile as the "Rolling truck Stones thing". Since November, 2001, the RSM has been owned by the National Music Centre in Calgary, Canada.

The Helios console from Town House records now resides and is utilized by Shorefire Recording Studios in Long Branch NJ.

=== Legacy ===
In the 10 years that Helios Electronics was in business, fewer than 50 Helios consoles were built, and it is estimated that only 20 of these consoles remain intact, while others have been parted out, rebuilt, or cloned. The rarity of the consoles, along with their use on so many notable recordings, has made the Helios sound something sought out by recording professionals

=== Hardware recreations ===
In 1988, Tony Arnold, who had been servicing Helios consoles, acquired a few used consoles and acquired the Helios trademark to re-establish Helios Electronics Ltd., eventually developing the Helios EQ1 Lunchbox input module.

In 2004, Helios Electronics released the Type 69 mic/line/EQ module, a reissue of the input section of the rare silver Olympic Studios mixing desk.

In 2011, Anamod introduced the Realios TL Compressor, a 500-series module based on the compressor modules in vintage Helios consoles.

In 2020, H2 Audio introduced the Helios 2128 microphone preamp and the Helios 5011 EQ 500-series format modules.

=== Software emulations ===
In 2007, Universal Audio introduced the Type 69 EQ signal processing plug-in, officially licensed by Helios. An updated version of the plug-in was introduced in 2018.

In 2010, Waves Audio introduced the Kramer HLS Channel plug-in based on the input channel of Helios consoles. Waves developed the plug-in in cooperation with producer/engineer Eddie Kramer and with the use of the Rolling Stones Mobile Studio Helios console.
