= Ramport Studios =

Recording studio

Coordinates: 51°28′36.60″N 0°08′19.18″W

Ramport Studios was a recording studio in south London's Battersea district, built by the Who in 1973.

== History ==
Originally called "The Kitchen" and later renamed Ramport Studios, the recording studio was initially built as a private studio for the Who, who intended to use it to record Quadrophenia. The building, located at 115 Thessaly Road in south London's Battersea district, was a former church hall which required extensive remodeling, with the resulting expenses leading to Ramport later operating as a commercial studio in order to recoup revenue.

The studio had a 50x30 ft live room and a control room initially outfitted with a quad-ready 32-input wrap-around Helios mixing console, but in order to fully realize their 1973 album Quadrophenia, the Who augmented the studio with Ronnie Lane's Mobile Studio.

In 1974, Supertramp recorded Crime of the Century at Ramport. The same year, Neil Young, together with Robbie Robertson, recorded the song "White Line"; this was released on the album Homegrown in 2020.

In 1975 Irish artist Chris de Burgh recorded parts of his album Spanish Train and Other Stories in these studios.

Johnny Thunders and the Heartbreakers spent much of the summer of 1977 recording and mixing the album L.A.M.F. there for the Who's label Track Records. Joan Jett recorded several tracks there which would end up on her Joan Jett album, later retitled Bad Reputation (1981).

In 1976 the original Helios mixing console was replaced by a Neve console, and in the same year Thin Lizzy recorded Jailbreak at the studio. Later that same year they would again use the studio to record their album Johnny the Fox.

Judas Priest recorded their album Sin After Sin there in 1976–1977.

In 1983 the studio was bought by Virgin Records and was renamed Town House Three as part of the labels' Townhouse Studios. In 1985, the studio received the Helios console previously used by The Town House Studio 1, which remained in use until 1988.

In 1995, the studio was closed by Virgin's new owners, EMI, and sold the following year. It is now a doctors' surgery and health centre.

In 2017 the Wandsworth Council recognized the studio's historic location with a green plaque.
