= StudioMini =

StudioMini, (first release: 9 September 2009), is an iPhone app for multitrack audio recording for musicians and audio enthusiasts. StudioMini can record on three separate audio tracks. It includes a fourth track of 78 prerecorded audio loops consisting of drum and percussion patterns. The fourth track also provides a metronome option as well as allowing the user to it leave blank with no rhythmic track. The software application is sold exclusively through Apple's iTunes App Store and only works with the Apple iPhone, iPod touch and iPad. The latest version of StudioMini features enhanced graphics resolution for the Retina display of the iPhone 4.

StudioMini XL is an iPad exclusive version of the software which can record on seven audio tracks and features a UI (user interface) that is created specifically for the iPad screen.

The software records CD quality audio in the .aif format in 16-bit linear PCM sampled at 44.1 kHz. It can record audio from the built-in microphone of the device it's running on, or access the microphone input from the headphone input jack. There are a variety of hardware options for recording through the headphone input jack, including using iPhone specific DI units like the IK Multimedia iRig, Peavey AmpKit LiNK and the PRS Guitar Bud. This input is also accessed by the Apple iPhone headset as well as a Camcorder AV cable connected to a mixer or mic preamp. StudioMini XL for the iPad can accept audio input and output through USB audio interfaces connected to the dock through the Apple iPad Camera Connection Kit. StudioMini connects to a web browser allowing the user to download recorded tracks as well as the drum loop prerecorded audio tracks.

StudioMini is developed by Fantastocrats, a software company based in Los Angeles, California.
