= Channel strip =

Component of an audio mixer

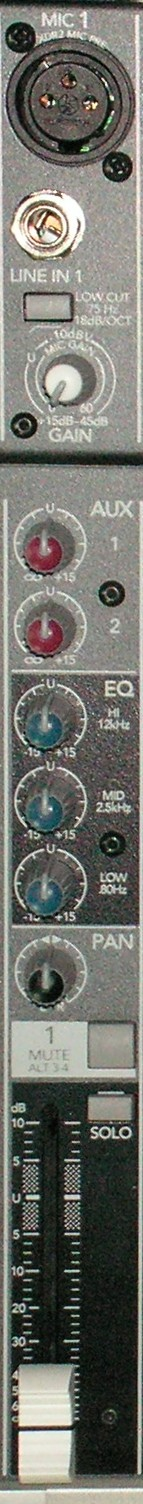
Mackie 1402-VLZ3 Channel Strip

A channel strip is a device that allows the output of an audio device to be amplified to a line level and integrated into some other system. An audio channel strip may be a stand-alone unit or one of many units built into a mixing desk. It usually includes a microphone preamp with a switchable phantom power voltage to power condenser microphones and some form of audio equalization. Some designs also offer other facilities including audio compression, de-essing, noise-gating and limiting.

== Manufacturers ==
Manufacturers of stand-alone channel strips include:

- AMS Neve
- Aphex
- Aurora Audio
- Buzz Audio
- dbx
- Focusrite
- GML
- Manley Laboratories
- Millennia Media
- PreSonus
- Tree Audio
- Trident Audio Developments
- Universal Audio

== Processing ==
The signal flow on a channel strip on an analog mixer generally flows from top to bottom. At the top is an input, which is typically a female XLR jack. Moving downward, the next step in the signal processing is typically a gain knob. A pad switch may also be provided to attenuate particularly strong signals. The next main segment of the processing is equalization. A high pass filter button is present in many cases, as well as semi or fully parametric equalization. Depending on the design of the mixer, there may also be knobs for auxiliary sends, typically used for monitors and effects units. A pan knob can be used to send the signal to a specific side in a stereo system. A pre-fade listen (PFL) button allows the channel to be monitored. Depressing this button can display the level on a signal meter, and will also route the audio of that channel to a headphone output. A mute button will silence the channel in both the main mix and auxiliary sends. Finally, a fader or level knob controls the volume being sent to the main mix.

On a digital mixing console, the process is usually the same, but often many of the adjustments are consolidated into a common set of knobs. Each channel will still retain an individual fader and mute button. On digital boards, it is also common for each channel to have compression and a noise gate.

Various audio software companies, such as Universal Audio, provide digital emulation plug-ins of the sound of classic analog audio mixing console channel strips, such as the legendary vacuum-tube EMI REDD (highly regarded for early Beatles and Pink Floyd recordings), Solid State Logic (SSL) SL 4000, Neve and API (Automated Processes, Inc.)
