= AMS Neve =

British audio equipment manufacturer

AMS Neve Ltd
- Company type: Private
- Industry: Professional audio design & engineering
- Founded: 1992; 34 years ago
- Headquarters: Burnley, Lancashire
- Products: Audio & recording equipment
- Website: ams-neve.com

AMS Neve Ltd is a privately owned audio engineering company who specialise in digital and analogue music consoles, outboard equipment and post production consoles. AMS Neve was the result of the amalgamation in 1992 of AMS (Advanced Music Systems) with Neve Electronics.

== Background ==
Neve Electronics was a British manufacturer of mixing consoles that originated in the work of Rupert Neve in the 1960s. Neve analogue consoles have been considered to be of such high quality that many of twenty or thirty years of age are still in use today at recording studios around the world—even as digital audio has taken over many aspects of recording technology. Studios with Neve equipment are often sought out by musicians. Models such as the '1073' and '1081' microphone preamps are still among the most popular and expensive in the recording world.

Neve was the first company to develop computer-controlled moving fader automation, NECAM, in the mid-1970s.

In 1985 Neve Electronics was acquired by the Siemens group; in 1992 the Siemens group combined Neve Electronics with another newly acquired company, Advanced Music Systems to form AMS Neve. Today, the company produces both digital and analogue systems, marketing digital products under the AMS Neve brand, and analogue products under the Neve brand.

== Awards ==
AMS Neve won a Technical Grammy Award in 2000. The company has also won Oscar and Emmy awards.

== Notable products ==
Analogue Consoles:

- Neve 88R and 88RS Large-format analogue consoles
- Neve Genesys and Genesys Black
- Neve BCM10/2

Digital Consoles:

- AMS Neve DFC (Digital film console)
- AMS Neve MMC/DMC (Multimedia consoles)

Outboard:

- AMS RMX16 digital reverb
- AMS DMX digital delay
- 8801 Channel Strip (based on the Channel strip of the aforementioned 88R/88RS console)
- Neve 8816 Summing Mixer/8804 Fader Pack
- Neve 88RLB/1073LB/1073LBEQ/2264ALB API-format 500 Series "Lunchbox" modules
- Neve 1073/1081 Re-issues
- 33609JD Stereo Compressor
