= Townhouse Studios =

Recording studio in London, England

Coordinates: 51°30′06″N 0°13′55″W

The Town House (also known as Townhouse Studios) was a recording studio located at 140 Goldhawk Road, Shepherd's Bush in London, built in 1978 under the direction of Richard Branson for Virgin Records. The studios changed ownership and eventually ceased operation in 2008, with luxury apartments now in its place.

Artists that recorded at the Town House included Elton John, Queen, Phil Collins, Philip Bailey, OMD, Simple Minds, The Jam, Asia, Bryan Ferry, Coldplay, Muse, Duran Duran, Jamiroquai, Kylie Minogue, Oasis, XTC, Robbie Williams, Peter Gabriel, Midnight Oil and Joan Armatrading. Studio Two's "Stone Room" was an especially popular place to record drum sounds during the 1980s, directly as a result of producer Hugh Padgham's treatment of the drums on Phil Collins' "In the Air Tonight".

== History ==
The Town House was originally managed by Barbara Jeffries as part of the Virgin Studios Group. The Goldhawk Road facility had three recording rooms, numbered One, Two, and Four, with the Townhouse Three designation given to Ramport Studios after the Virgin Group acquired it from The Who in 1984.

The exterior of the building was covered with trompe-l'œil murals by Ken WHote.

Town House Studio One originally was home to a 72-input Helios console with an Alison 64K computer mixdown system, which now resides at Shorefire Recording Studios, Long Branch, New Jersey, United States. The Town House established a close relationship with Solid State Logic when it became the first studio in the UK to install an SL 4000 B Series console in Studio Two in 1978. SSL commemorated the partnership in 1995 by installing its 1000th console, an SL 4000 G+, in The Town House's Studio One.

Artists that recorded at the Town House included Elton John, Queen, Phil Collins, Philip Bailey, The Jam, Asia, Bryan Ferry, Coldplay, Muse, General Public, Duran Duran, Jamiroquai, Kylie Minogue, Oasis, XTC, Robbie Williams, Peter Gabriel, and Joan Armatrading. Studio Two's "Stone Room" was an especially popular place to record drum sounds during the 1980s, directly as a result of producer Hugh Padgham's treatment of the drums on Phil Collins' "In the Air Tonight". Also, Rob Hirst's drum solo in "The Power and the Passion" from the 10, 9, 8, 7, 6, 5, 4, 3, 2, 1 album produced by Nick Launay.

In July 1984, Town House opened Studio Three in Battersea, which was the former Ramport Studios, purchased from the Who. Studio Three replaced Ramport's Neve console with the original Helios mixing console from Town House Studio One. The Helios console would later be replaced by another Neve console.

On 27 August 1986, Bob Dylan entered the studio and recorded a few songs including the unreleased "To Fall in Love with You". Thought to be one of Dylan's greatest masterpieces, the song was not completed or considered suitable for official release. Dylan was in England for filming Hearts of Fire, having completed an exhausting tour promoting his album Knocked Out Loaded. It is not known how many takes of "To Fall in Love with You" were recorded but only one take exists. Dylan returned to the studio the following day and may have decided to record further songs.

In 1992, Branson sold Virgin Records, including the Virgin Studios Group and The Town House, to EMI. In 2002, the Sanctuary Group bought the studio from EMI. Al Stone, a recording engineer and producer who trained at The Town House, ran the studios for Sanctuary beginning in 2006, only to see Universal close it around April 2008 after a Sanctuary buy-out. Today, a luxury apartment complex is located at the address.
