= Neve 80 Series =

Hand-wired analogue mixing consoles

The Neve 80 Series are a series of hand-wired analogue mixing consoles designed and manufactured from 1968 to 1979 by Neve Electronics, founded by the English electronics engineer Rupert Neve. Renowned for their sound quality, Neve 80 Series consoles dominated the high-end recording studio market in the 1970s.

The historical importance of these Neve mixing consoles was highlighted in Dave Grohl's 2013 documentary film, Sound City.

== History ==
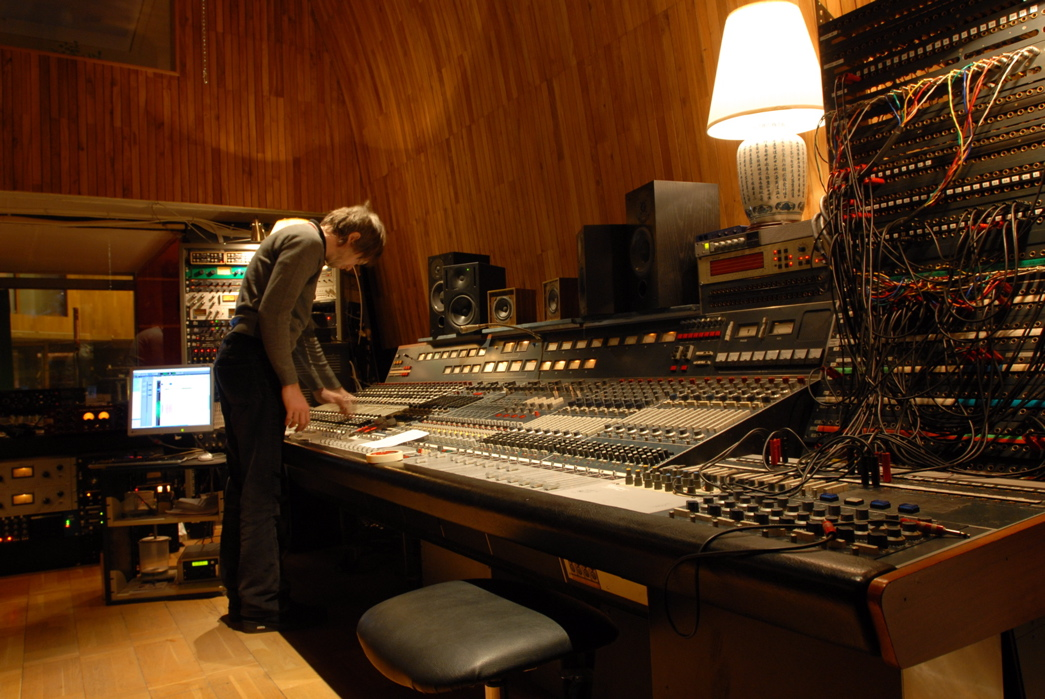
The Neve 8048 in Svenska Grammofonstudion Gothenburg, previously owned by Queen and used in Mountain Studios

Following Neve's success with the A88 and BCM10 mixing consoles and the company's move to a new purpose-built factory in Melbourn in 1968, the company developed and introduced the first 80 Series mixing consoles.

Each of these consoles was assembled with a combination of Neve's preamps, line amps, and compressor/limiters modules, completely hand-wired by Neve technicians to exacting standards.

The simplest 80 Series consoles had 4 buses and were outfitted with Neve's 1073 preamps, 1272 line amps, and 2254 compressor/limiters. The 8014 featured 16 channels, and 8 track monitoring, while the 8034 featured 20 channels, and 16 track monitoring.

The Neve 8048, which utilised Neve's new 1081 preamp and 4-band EQ across either 24 or 32 channels, was exhibited at the AES Expo of 1974 in Denmark. It was a Neve 8048 at Mountain Studios, where albums by Queen, Iggy Pop, AC/DC, and David Bowie were recorded. At London Bridge Studio in Seattle, a Neve 8048 was used to record albums by 3 Doors Down, Alice in Chains, Cat Power, Death Cab for Cutie, Mother Love Bone, and Temple of the Dog.

In 1976, Neve introduced the first in-line-monitor Neve consoles, the 8058 and 8068. In 1978, the 8078, last of the hardwired "production" 80 Series consoles, was introduced. Late-’70s Neves were available factory-equipped with NECAM (Neve Computer Assisted Mixdown system), Neve’s first foray into computer-assisted mixing technology and the world’s first successful moving-fader automation system.

A limited number of these consoles were ever made; Neve ceased production of the 80 Series in 1979.

Removing many of the inadequacies of the 8078 series was a custom-made Neve console A4792, constructed in 1978 for George Martin's AIR Studios in Montserrat. Used on such recordings as Dire Straits' award-winning album Brothers in Arms, that A4792 console is now in operation at Subterranean Sound Studios in Toronto, Ontario. Only three of these consoles were ever made; of the other two originally installed at AIR Studios in London, one is in operation at AIR Lyndhurst Hall, while the other is in use at The Warehouse Studio in Vancouver, B.C.

== Legacy ==
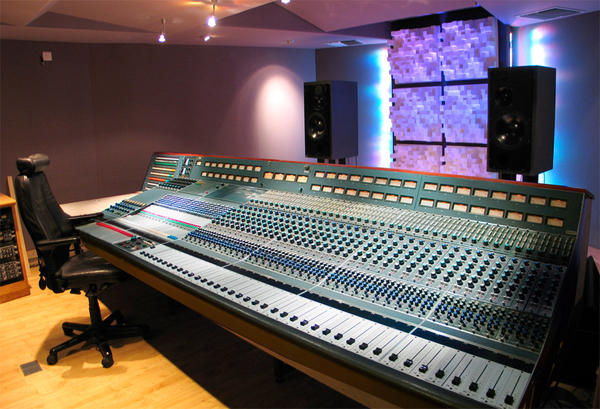
Custom Neve 8078 in The Way Recording Studio London

The rarity of these consoles makes them quite valuable, and there are now only a few select studios who have Neve 80 Series consoles still in use. These include:

- Arda Recorders in Porto, Portugal, houses a vintage 32-input, 16-bus Neve 8068 console (equipped with 24 Neve 31102 and 8 Neve 1066 modules) as the centerpiece of its Studio A control room.
- Blackbird Studio A in Nashville, Tennessee (72-input 8078). Console custom-built for and previously owned by Motown's Hitsville West, then Donald Fagen.
- The Barn in Malibu, California (8014), owned by musician and producer Michael Marquart.
- The Church Studio in Tulsa, Oklahoma (8068). Console previously owned by Daniel Lanois
- Clive Davis Institute of Recorded Music in Brooklyn's recreation of Oscilloscope Laboratories in Tribeca (custom modified 8078 with 72 channels of flying faders). Console formerly at Threshold Sound + Vision, and at Sony Music West in Santa Monica, California prior to that.
- Clubhouse in Rhinebeck, New York (28-channel 8058)
- Criteria Studio C in Miami, Florida (40-channel 8078)
- Dockside Studio in Milton, Louisiana (52-input 8058 with automation)
- EastWest Studios in Hollywood, California (80-channel 8078)
- Electric Lady Studios in New York City (40-channel 8078). Console previously owned by Clinton Recording Studios.
- ElectraSonic Sound Recording Studio in North Vancouver, British Columbia, Canada (8078)
- Flying Blanket Recording in Mesa, Arizona (8078), owned by record producer, songwriter and musician Bob Hoag. Console previously owned by BBC and Fort Apache Studios.
- Groove Masters Studio in Santa Monica, California, Jackson Browne's studio (72-input 8078)
- Studio Hana in Amsterdam, the Netherlands (8058) Owned by producer Bear Damen. Console previously owned by Bill Botrell. "Studio Hana". Studio Hana.
- Lattitude Studio South in Leiper's Fork, Tennessee (8078) owned by producer, writer, engineer, mixer Michael Lattanzi. Console previously owned by Dave Way in Los Angeles.
- Marshall Studio in Milton Keynes, UK (8048)
- Metalworks Studios in Mississauga, Ontario, Canada (custom 32-channel 8048 with 12 x 1081s, 12 x 1064s, 8 x 1093s and an additional 3 x 1073s)
- Ocean Way Nashville in Nashville, Tennessee (custom 80-input all-discrete 8078)
- The Parlor Recording Studio in New Orleans, Louisiana (8078)
- Pedernales Country Club in Austin, Texas, Willie Nelson's studio
- Power Station Studio A in New York, New York (custom 40-input 8088)
- Riksmixningsverket/RMV Studio in Stockholm, Sweden (64-channel 8068), owned by Benny Andersson of ABBA
- Royaltone Studios in North Hollywood, California, now owned by songwriter producer Linda Perry
- The Site Recording Environment in Marin County, California
- Sonic Ranch in Tornillo, Texas. Custom console with 80 channels of pres (two consoles combined by Pat Schneider and Bill Dooley) with flying faders, 32 channels of monitor inputs, and 24 buses largest vintage Neve in the world. Originally in Motown West Coast, it moved L.A.'s Brooklyn Studios owned by Freddy Demann and Madonna, then acquired by Yoshiki from X Japan.
- Sound City Studios in Van Nuys, California (operating one 28-channel 8028 and one 40-channel 8078) (which closed in May 2011 and reopened in early 2017). The board was purchased by Dave Grohl for his personal studio, Studio 606. In 2013, he produced a documentary about the console, called Sound City, and an album recorded with it with a large panel of rock stars (most of whom having been recorded on the console at Sound City), called Sound City: Real To Reel.
- Sphere Studios in Los Angeles, California
- Vox Recording Studios in Hollywood, California (24-channel 8028)
- The Way Recording Studio in London, England

== See also ==
- Rupert Neve
- Neve Electronics
