= John Dudderidge =

British canoeist (1906–2004)

John Webster Dudderidge OBE (August 24, 1906 – January 23, 2004) was a British canoeist who competed in the 1936 Summer Olympics. For many years he was head of PE at Haberdashers' Aske's boys school in north London, where he also headed the Special Service Unit for those who elected not to join the school cadet corps. He still canoed into his 90s, though he had to switch to the Canadian style.

He was born in Sheffield and died in Cambridge. One of his children is sound engineer Phil Dudderidge.

In 1936, he and his partner Alex Brearley finished ninth in the folding K-2 10000 m event.
