= Phil Dudderidge =

British sound engineer, entrepreneur

Philip Stephen Dudderidge OBE (born 6 February 1949 in Radlett, England) is a British sound engineering entrepreneur. He is a notable figure in the professional audio industry, having worked as Led Zeppelin's concert sound mixer, and later co-founding Soundcraft Electronics Ltd before serving as Chairman of Focusrite Audio Engineering Ltd.

== Early years ==
Phil Dudderidge was born in 1949, the second son and fourth child of John Dudderidge OBE and Dr. Evelyn Dudderidge.

Dudderidge attended Haberdashers' Aske's Boys' School in Elstree, Hertfordshire, but dropped out of school at the age of 17 to work for Gerald Frankel at CAPS Research Ltd. In 1967, he got a job with noted UK underground newspaper International Times delivering the paper and posters from Osiris Visions to outlets around London. While working there, he met Osiris Visions owner and record producer / band manager Joe Boyd and became a roadie / chauffeur for Fairport Convention and subsequently the Incredible String Band. Dudderidge later worked with Pete Brown and The Battered Ornaments and Soft Machine.

== Live sound ==
In 1970, Charlie Watkins (of WEM PA fame) introduced Dudderidge to Peter Grant, manager of Led Zeppelin, beginning not only Dudderidge's first concert sound engineering assignment, but also it is believed the notable position of Led Zeppelin's first dedicated live sound engineer (and "WEM expert"). This job lasted from March to May 1970, encompassing tour dates in both Europe and the U.S. The tour almost killed him due to lack of sleep and near misses on the road, and he chose to leave the band to work in the live sound industry.

While working for Hiwatt Amplification (1970-1971) he became house engineer for the Implosion concerts at the Roundhouse in London, providing the Hiwatt PA and backline equipment. He then partnered with Paul Dobson and Graham Blyth to form his first company, RSD, building custom PA systems for Roy Wood's Wizzard and Steve Harley & Cockney Rebel amongst others, with custom-built mixing consoles derived from a Bill Kelsey original design. During the '70s, Blyth and Dudderidge with Roger Lindsay, owned Europa Concert Systems, a live sound company that catered to American bands touring Europe and providing monitor systems for The BBC's Old Grey Whistle Test TV shows.

== Soundcraft ==
In 1973, Dudderidge and Blyth left RSD to form Soundcraft Electronics, Ltd., the company specializing in live sound and recording mixing consoles. Dudderidge's involvement with this company also led to his working with notable pro audio industry figures Betty Bennett (now CEO of Apogee Electronics Corporation), Wayne Freeman (of Trident USA, Fairlight, Amek, Otari, and most notably Marshall Electronics), and Shane Morris (designer of the ATI Paragon monitor console and later of PRS Guitars). 15 years later, in 1988, Soundcraft, firmly established as a leading console brand, was sold to Harman International Industries.

== Focusrite ==
Dudderidge left Soundcraft in early 1989 and formed a new company, Focusrite Audio Engineering Ltd. to continue to develop and manufacture Focusrite-branded products after it acquired the assets of Rupert Neve's company, Focusrite Ltd., thus inheriting the Focusrite range designed prior to 1989. Focusrite acquired the assets of Novation Electronic Music Systems in 2004 and the Novation brand became integrated into the business. Focusrite established Focusrite Novation Inc.(FNI) to represent its interests in the United States and manage marketing and Tier One reseller relationships. FNI is based in Los Angeles, California.

Focusrite has been the recipient of many industry awards and most notably four Queen’s Awards for Enterprise, two for International Trade and two for Technology.

Focusrite Plc. which incorporates Focusrite Audio Engineering Ltd and subsidiaries, floated on the London AIM market in December 2014. Dudderidge is currently Executive Chairman of Focusrite Plc.

In 2019, Focusrite Plc (Focusrite Group) acquired two professional loudspeaker companies, ADAM Audio GmbH, Berlin, and Martin Audio Ltd. Like Focusrite, Martin Audio is located in High Wycombe, Buckinghamshire, England.

Dudderidge was appointed Officer of the Order of the British Empire (OBE) in the 2024 New Year Honours for services to business and the music industry.

== Family ==
Dudderidge married Jennifer "Jenny" Hayes in 1973. The couple produced five sons and a daughter: Mr. Tim Dudderidge, Consultant Urologist and prostate cancer expert at University Hospital Southampton; Tom Dudderidge; Jamie Dudderidge, Managing Director at I-Blason UK; Simon Dudderidge, Founder and Managing Director at Comsense Ltd; Jo Dudderidge, musician, songwriter and producer (The Travelling Band, Later Youth) and Joanna Dudderidge, photographer and graphic designer. Phil and Jenny have twelve grandchildren.
