= David Engelke =

American businessman

David Engelke is an American entrepreneur who purchased audio manufacturing company Solid State Logic in cooperation with musician Peter Gabriel in 2005. The imaging, editing and analysis technologies he developed have earned him and his companies three EMMY Awards from the National Academy of Television Arts and Sciences and an OSCAR from the Academy of Motion Picture Arts And Sciences and a technical GRAMMY award from the Recording Academy.
