= Solid State Logic =

British audio equipment manufacturer

Solid State Logic Ltd.
- Type: Private
- Industry: Professional audio
- Founded: 1969; 57 years ago
- Founder: Colin Sanders, Robert Pennells
- Headquarters: Begbroke, Oxfordshire, England
- Products: 4000 series console; 9000 series console; AWS900+ console
- Number of employees: 160 (2006)
- Parent: Audiotonix
- Subsidiaries: Harrison Audio
- Website: solidstatelogic.com

Solid State Logic Ltd. (SSL) is a British company based in Begbroke, Oxfordshire, England that designs and markets audio mixing consoles, signal processors, and other audio technologies for the post-production, video production, broadcast, sound reinforcement and music recording industries. SSL employs over 160 people worldwide and has regional offices in Los Angeles, Milan, New York City, Paris, and Tokyo, with additional support provided by an international network of distributors. Solid State Logic is part of the Audiotonix Group.

== History ==
=== Early history ===
Solid State Logic was founded by Colin Sanders and Robert Pennells in 1969 as the first manufacturer of solid-state control systems for pipe organs. Sanders coined the company's name to explain the then-modern technology of transistor and FET switching to organ builders.

Sanders also owned and operated Acorn Studios, a recording studio in Stonesfield, Oxfordshire. When he sought a mixing console for recording, with routing flexibility and settings recall unavailable on consoles at that time, Sanders applied his experience to design and built his own, building two mixing consoles with computer control which featured one-button switching between recording, tracking and mixdown modes. The two prototype mixing consoles, given the model designation of SL 4000 A, became the start of a series of large-format mixers that would define and establish SSL as a mixing console manufacturer.

=== Large-format mixing consoles ===
In 1976, SSL combined the SL 4000's in-line mixing console design with a computer that provided fader automation and programmable tape transport auto-location functionality, A total of six B Series consoles were built for and sold to studios, beginning with Abbey Road Studios in London, followed by Le Studio in Morin-Heights, Canada, Virgin Records' Townhouse Studios in London, and Tocano Studio in Copenhagen.

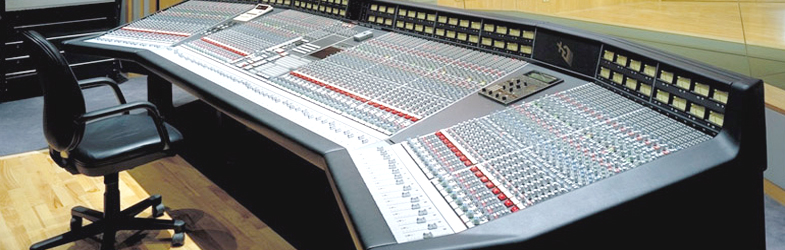
Townhouse Studios SL4000G+ Serial #1000 (image reversed)

The SL 4000 E Series, introduced in 1979, offered various improvements on the B Series, including a new 4-band EQ section developed in collaboration with George Martin. Most notably, the E Series introduced the ability to save and recall mixer settings, and was the first mixer to feature a compressor/gate on every channel as well as the master bus compressor. SSL introduced the SL 4000 G Series at the AES New York Convention in 1987, which again offered a redesigned EQ, among other improvements. The ability to save and recall mixer settings, along with the inclusion of a dedicated compressor and noise gate on every channel on SL 4000 E Series consoles and its successors and variants drove widespread adoption in professional recording studios, including The Power Station, Sarm Studios, Larrabee Sound Studios, Battery Studios, Record One, Eden Studios, and RG Jones Recording Studios, and used by recording engineers such as Bob Clearmountain, Steve Lillywhite, Tom Lord-Alge, Alan Moulder, and Trevor Horn.

The SL 4000 E Series and G Series consoles were later also made available in 5000 Series, 6000 Series, and 8000 Series formats, which offered various routing and bussing configurations to address the needs of sound for the recording, film, video, and broadcast markets. SSL introduced SuperAnalogue design in the SL 9000 J Series console, which utilized a capacitor-free signal path to achieve very high bandwidth with extremely low distortion.

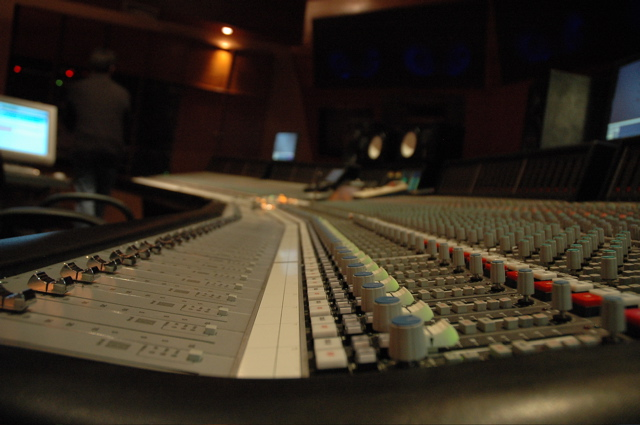
SL9000

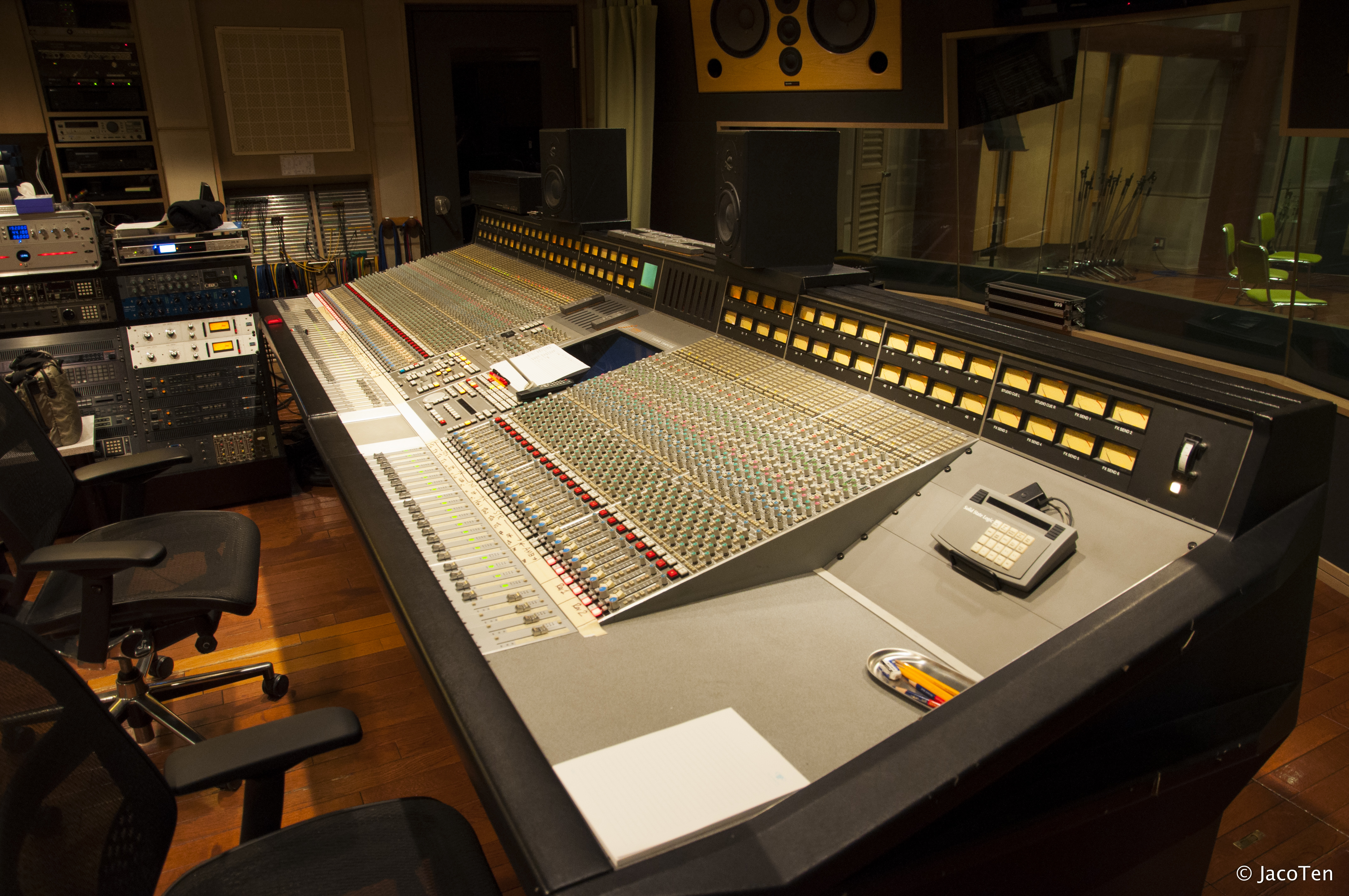
SL9064J

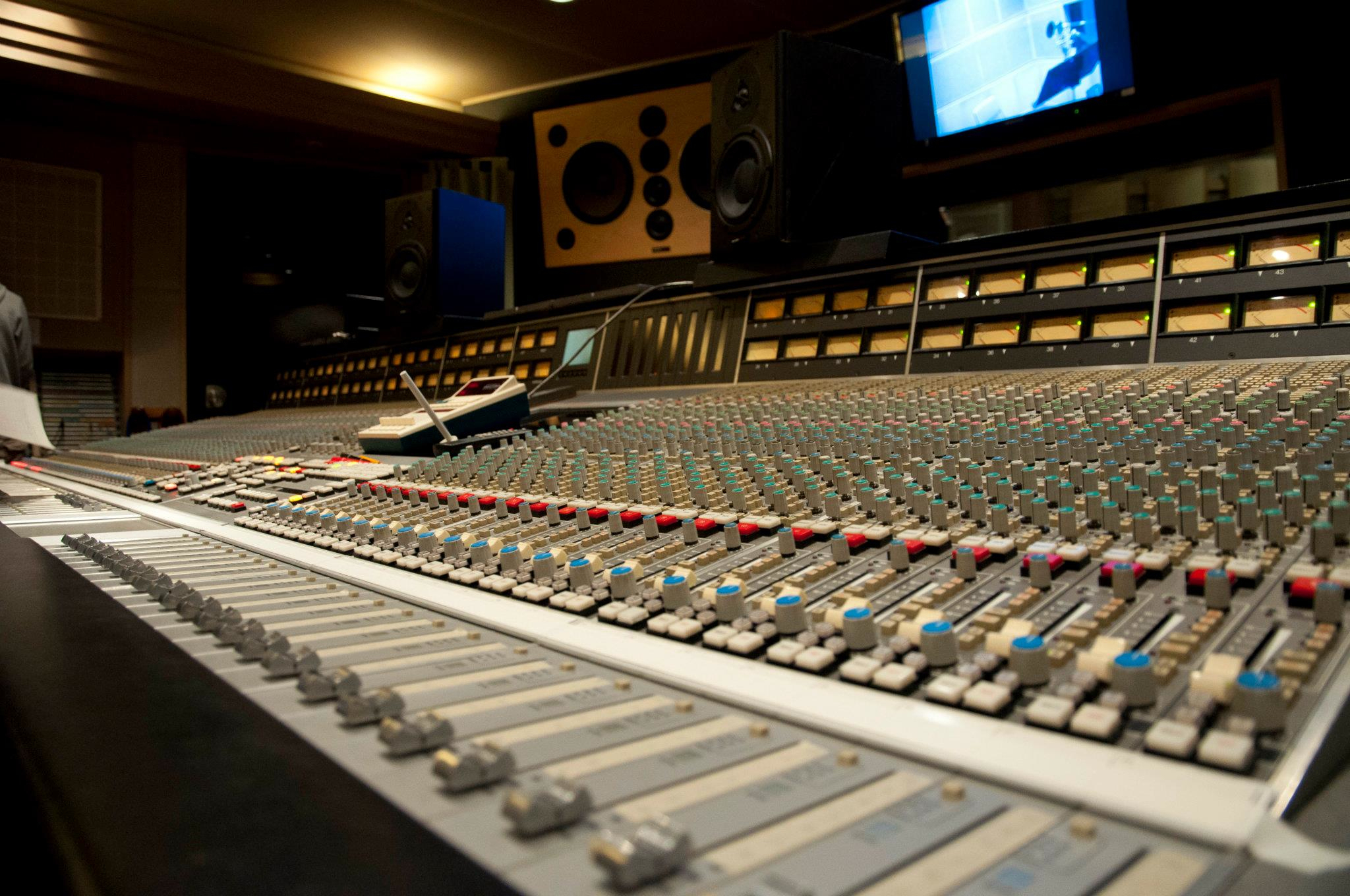
SL9064J

In 1996 Billboard magazine's Studio Action Chart reported that 83% of number one singles that year had been produced using an SSL mixing console. The company claims that more platinum albums have been recorded on SSL mixing consoles than any other company's equipment combined. By 2004, there were more than 3,000 SSL-equipped facilities worldwide.

In the 1990s, SSL also developed products for the post production and motion picture industry, and introduced the A Series digital mixing consoles. In the 2000s, the company introduced the C Series consoles designed to meet the needs of the broadcast production market.

=== Outboard processors and consoles with DAW control ===
In 2003, SSL introduced outboard signal processors that offered processing previously only available in SSL's large-format mixing consoles. The XLogic family of products included the Logic Channel, the company's first standalone channel strip. 2005 saw the release of additional processors, including the E Series channel strip and G Series Compressor, which utilized SSL's classic G Series center compressor design elements within a SuperAnalogue design topology. The X-Rack offered a modular solution for outboard signal processing.

In late 2004, SSL launched AWS 900, an integrated analogue console and DAW controller, and introduced its successor, the AWS 900+, two years later. SSL eventually listed over 300 studios using the AWS900. SSL later introduced the AWS 916, 924, and 948 with support for SSL's delta control plug-in.

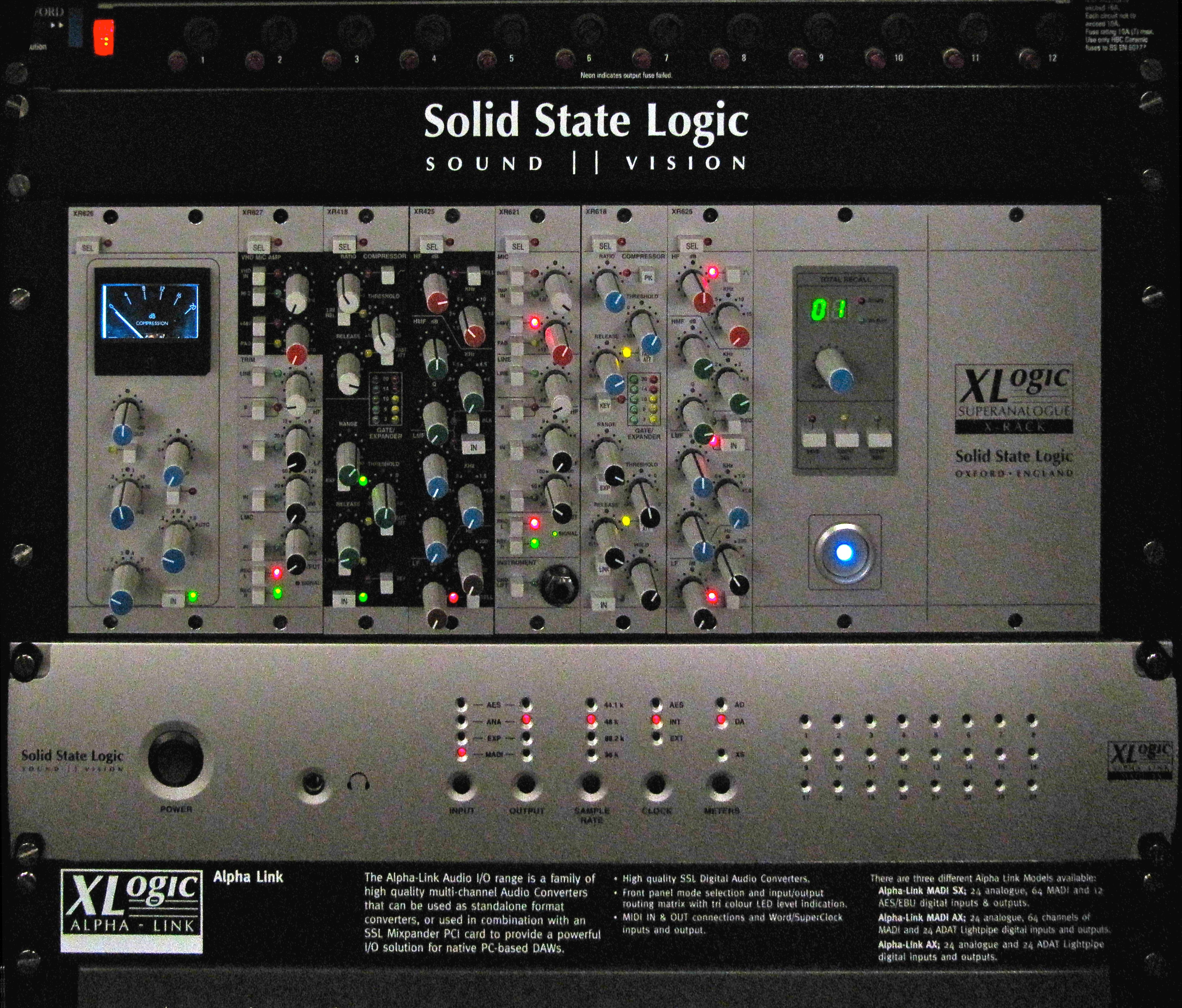
SSL XLogic X-Rack and Alpha-Link

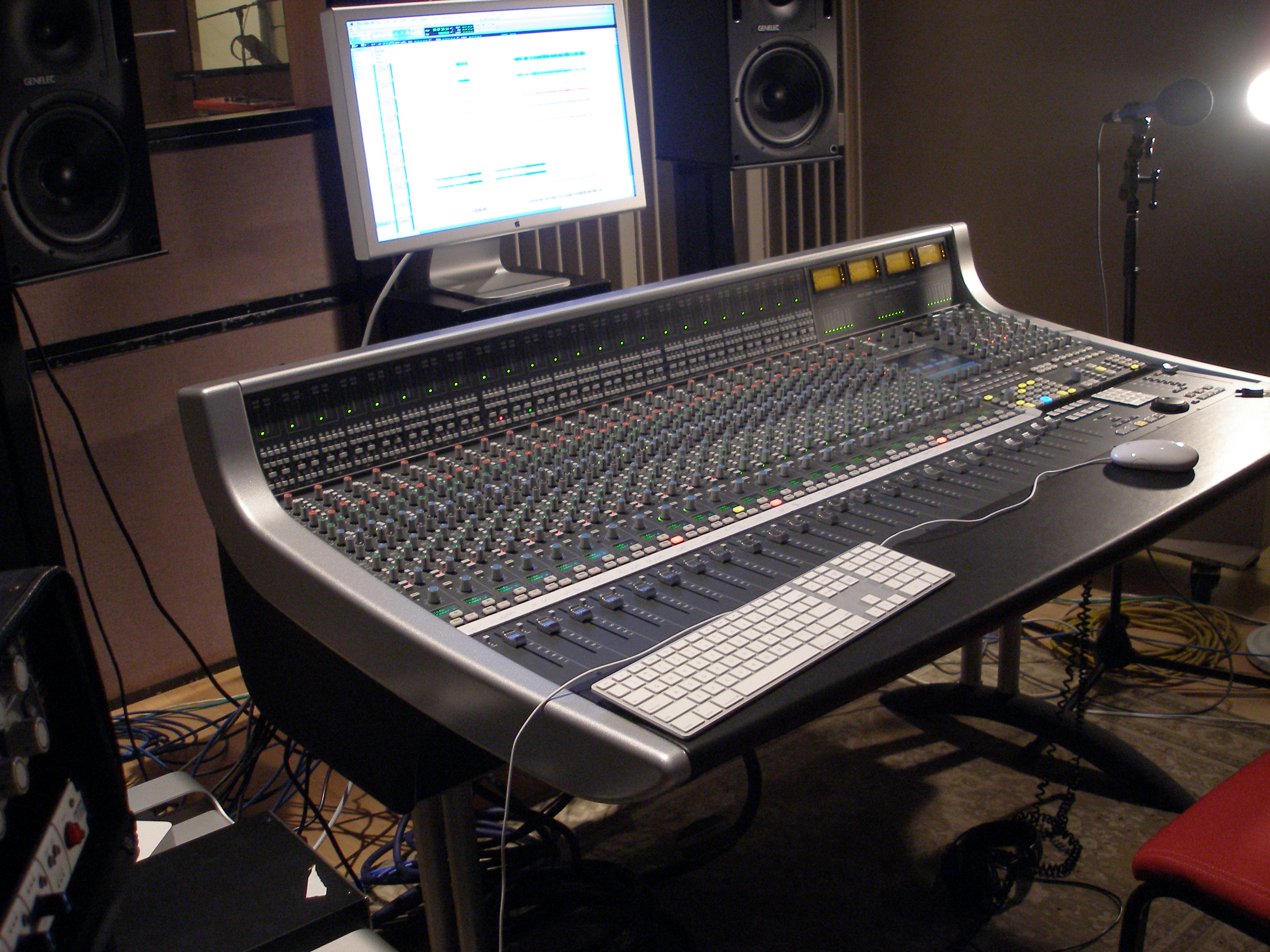
SSL AWS 900+ at Performance Studio

In late 2006, SSL launched Duality, a large-format console that combined mixing console functionality of the XL 9000K with the control surface features of the AWS 900. Duality featured updated signal routing controls, accessible from the console's center section rather than on each channel. The console's channel strips include both E Series & G Series equalization, which is selected via a single button per channel. The console also features 'Variable Harmonic Drive', or VHD microphone/line preamplifiers, which can either be utilised as standard low-distortion preamps, or in a mode which introduces 2nd (even) & 3rd (odd) order harmonic distortion.

Also in 2006 SSL introduced the Duende DSP platform designed to emulate SSL channel strip features for home recording enthusiasts, including filters, SSL E and G Series EQ and dynamics processing. Additionally, the system offers the SSL Stereo Bus Compressor. Based on the digital technology behind SSL's C-Series consoles, Duende was designed to integrate into DAW environments using either a FireWire cable connection or PCI-e card, with the digital processing channels appearing as VST or Audio Units plug-ins. On 25 April 2007, SSL announced the release of another plug-in for the Duende, called Drumstrip, which contained a noise gate, a transient shaper, high frequency and low frequency enhancers, and the Listening Mic Compressor.

The same year, the company announced its expansion into broadcast video content management and delivery with their MediaWAN system.

== Ownership changes ==
Solid State Logic sold its organ division in 2002; it is now known as Solid State Organ Systems. The proprietary aptX-codec was sold in a management buyout, with APT Licensing Ltd. incorporated on 1 March 2005 in Belfast.

In 2005, musician Peter Gabriel and broadcast entrepreneur David Engelke became majority shareholders of the company.

In 2017, Solid State Logic was acquired by the Audiotonix Group, while Gabriel became a major investor in the group following this transaction.

== Awards ==
The company received The Queen's Award for Enterprise: International Trade (Export) in 1981, and The Queen's Award for Enterprise: Innovation (Technology) in 1993 and 2020.

The company received a Special Merit/Technical Grammy Award at the 46th Annual Grammy Awards in February 2004 for "contributions of outstanding technical significance to the recording field."

Two of SSL's products were inducted into the TEC Awards TECnology Hall of Fame, which "honors and recognizes audio products and innovations that have made a significant contribution to the advancement of audio technology": the SL 4000 series of mixing consoles was inducted in 2004, and the AWS studio console was inducted in 2018.

== See also ==
- Soundscape Digital Technology – acquired by Solid State Logic
- Soundscape R.Ed
