= Soundcraft =

British audio equipment company

soundcraft logo

Soundcraft is a British designer and importer (formerly a manufacturer) of mixing consoles and other professional audio equipment. It is a subsidiary of Harman International Industries, which is owned by South Korean company Samsung Electronics. It was founded by sound engineer Phil Dudderidge and electronics designer Graham Blyth in 1973.

== History ==
Soundcraft first made its mark by manufacturing the Series 1, the first mixing console built into a flight-case. It was available with 12 or 16 input channels and 4 outputs—main stereo, plus a post-fader ‘echo’ send and pre-fader foldback. Each channel had four-band fixed-frequency EQ. The Series 1 also included a multi-pin connector that integrated with a multi-channel microphone snake to route signals from and to the stage from a mix position in the audience.

The Series 1S was introduced in 1975 as an upgraded Series 1. The Series 1S introduced the classic Soundcraft four-band EQ with two sweepable mid-range sections. In addition to The Series 1S added a second foldback send and was available in a 20 channel version.

In 1975, Soundcraft introduced the Series 2 console as a live and recording console. The Series 2 began to build Soundcraft's reputation for quality desks with the classic British sound. The Series 2 launched as a four-bus console, and was later available in an eight-bus version. Initially offered in 12- and 16-channel versions, a 24-channel version was later added. The design used a semi-modular approach with individual channels in separate modules. The master section was made up of echo return, group output, cue master and monitoring modules. The input channels were available in fixed-frequency EQ standard channel and swept EQ versions. The swept EQ version also allowed switching between microphone input and line input, which was typically attached to a multi-track recorder output. All channels provided stereo pan as well as four cue send buses that could be configured as pre- or post-fader and allowed individual monitoring via a pre-fade listen (PFL) function. Each channel could be routed directly to the left–right mix bus or to odd/even pairs of sub-mix buses.

== Models ==
Current analog mixing console models:

- Live: GB2, GB2R 12/2, GB2R 16, GB4, GB8, Live8, LX7ii, LX9
- Broadcast: RM100. RM105
- Multi-purpose: EFX, EPM, FX16ii
- Recording and post-production: M Series
- Signature Series: Signature 10, Signature 12, Signature 16, Signature 22
- Signature MTK Series: Signature 12 MTK, Signature 22 MTK

Current digital mixing consoles models:

- Vi Series
  - Vi1, Vi2, Vi4, Vi6
  - Vi2000, Vi3000, Vi5000, Vi7000
- Si Series
  - Si Impact
  - Si Expression 1, Si Expression 2, Si Expression 3
  - Si Performer 1, Si Performer 2, Si Performer 3
- Ui Series
  - Ui12, Ui16, Ui24R

Note: Soundcraft offers several apps to control their digital mixers remotely. Soundcraft is also compatible with multiple third party apps for digital mixer remote control.
