= Advanced Music Systems =

Former manufacturer of professional studio equipment

AMS (Advanced Music Systems)
- Industry: Professional audio design & engineering
- Founded: 1976; 50 years ago
- Headquarters: Burnley, Lancashire
- Key people: Mark Crabtree; Stuart Nevison
- Products: Audio & recording equipment

AMS (Advanced Music Systems) were a manufacturer of professional studio equipment. The company later merged with Neve Electronics to form AMS Neve.

== Background ==
AMS was established in 1976 by Mark Crabtree and Stuart Nevison. They were Aerospace engineers who moved into the design of professional studio equipment for the manipulation and control of sound. The first product designed by the company was the DM-20 Tape Phase Simulator. This initial product was used by ELO, 10cc and Paul McCartney, who used it on the Wings' London Town album in 1978.

AMS was floated on the London Stock Exchange in 1985. In 1990, Siemens bought AMS, merging it with Neve Electronics in 1992 to form AMS Neve, which continues to manufacture professional recording equipment under the Neve and AMS Neve brands. In 1995, Crabtree acquired AMS Neve.

== Notable products ==
=== DMX 15-80 Digital Delay Line ===
In 1978, AMS introduced the world's first microprocessor controlled, 15-bit digital delay line, the AMS DMX 15-80. One of the early users of the AMS DMX 15-80 was Manchester record producer Martin Hannett who would go on to own quite a few of the devices. By 1979, the DMX 15-80 was augmented with pitch changing capabilities.

The AMS DMX 15-80S - the stereo version of the DMX 15-80, with stereo inputs and outputs - was introduced in 1980. The delay is identical to the DMX 15-80, but with the addition of two input level controls to re-generation controls (one per channel).

In 1981 the DMX was upgraded to include the Loop Editing System, with which loops can be created and they are either run continuously or triggered for special effects and drop-ins. This paved way for the use of digital sampling. The DMX later included pitch changing and up to 32 seconds of delay.

=== RMX-16 Digital Reverb ===
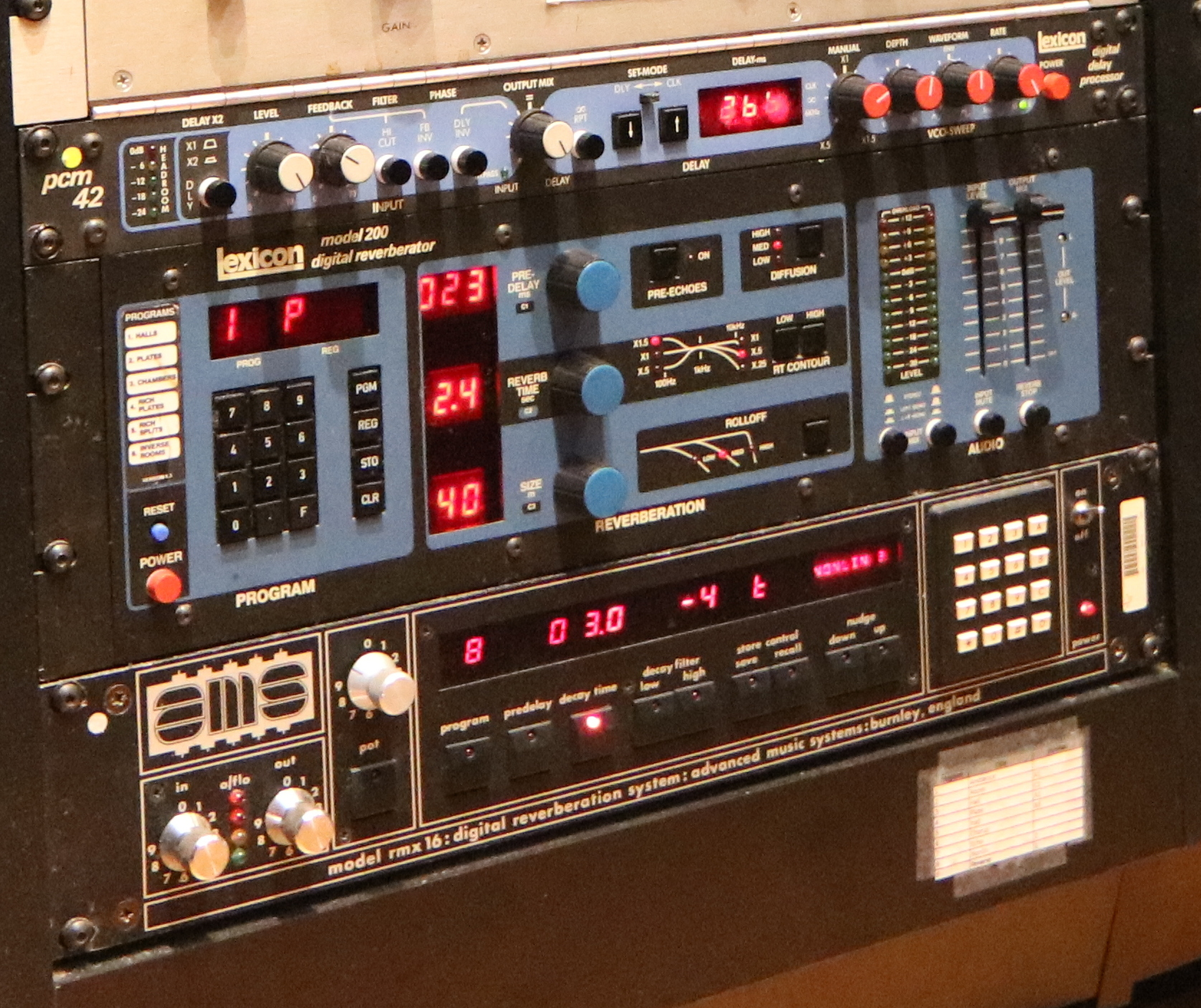
RMX-16 Digital Reverb (bottom)

In 1981, AMS released the RMX-16 digital reverberator. In addition to a range of reverb types, the RMX-16 had a program ("Non Lin 2") which digitally emulated the drum sound of a compressed and gated room microphone, copying the effect used on the Phil Collins recording In the Air Tonight. (Collins' drum sound was created by a combination of a room microphone compressed by the "Listen Mic" compressor of an early SSL Console, in combination with cutting off the reverb sound with a noise gate.)

=== AudioFile ===
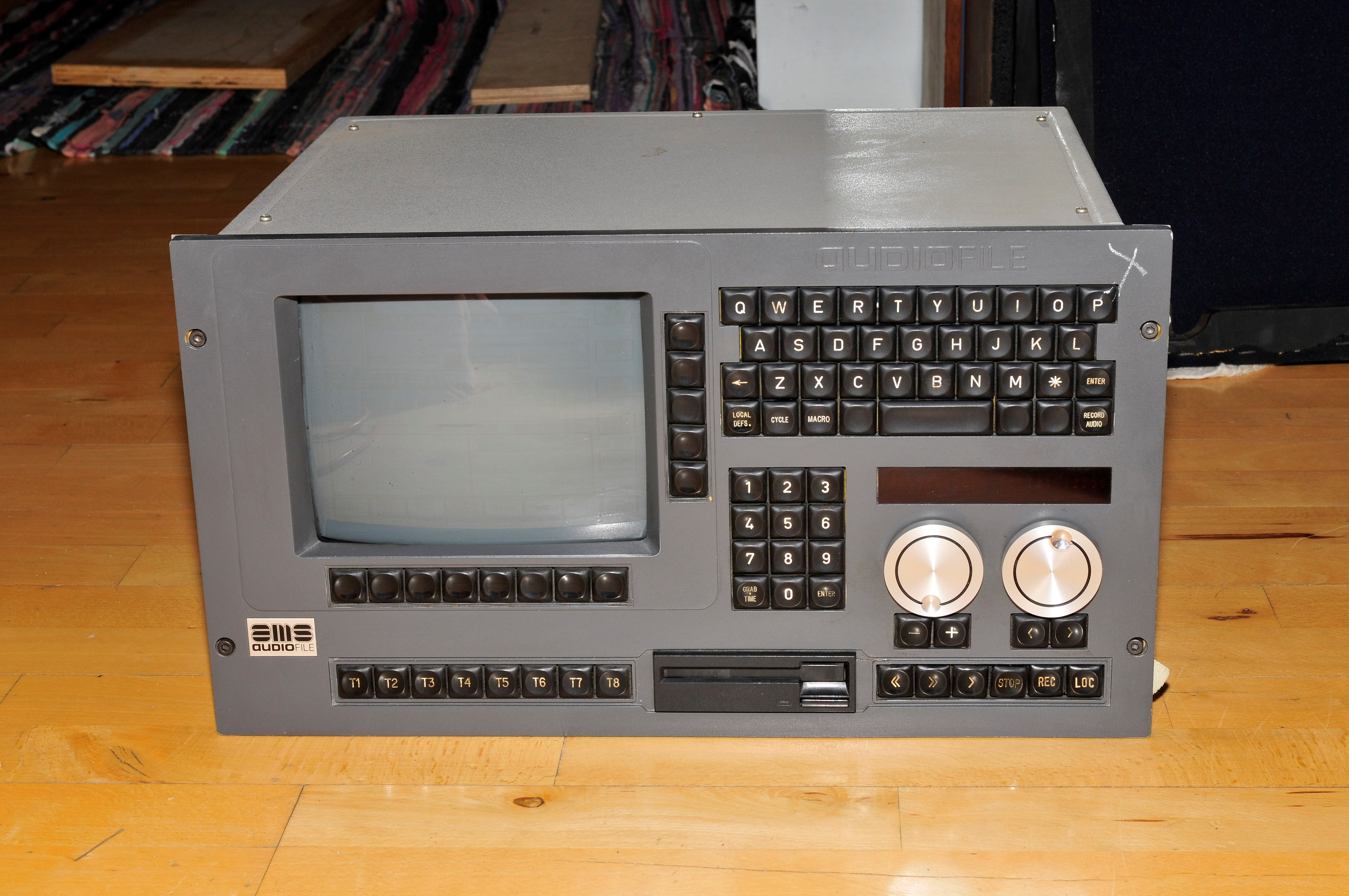
AMS Audiofile hard disc audio recorder

In 1984, AMS released the AudioFile, one of the first 16-bit hard disk based recording systems dedicated to post-production. The Audiofile saw considerable use in television post-production and was seen by dubbing mixers as a huge technological breakthrough. After decades of mixing on 16mm magnetic film stock, in which mix decisions were extremely difficult to undo, the ability to undo and make changes instantaneously provided dubbing mixers with new opportunities for experimentation in their work.

=== Logic 1 (Logic Series) Digital Console ===
In 1988, AMS released Logic 1, the first dynamically configurable, fully automated digital mixing console for professional applications. This was followed in 1990 by Logic 2, an expanded version of the Logic design in a large format console.

== Awards and recognition ==
The founders of AMS have been recognised with awards for their contributions to the recording and broadcast industry.

In March 2000, Crabtree was the recipient of an Oscar at the Academy Awards for the design and development of the AMS Neve Logic Digital Film Console for motion picture sound mixing. Crabtree was subsequently awarded a second Oscar in 2004 for "significant contributions to the evolution of digital audio editing for motion picture post production".

Nevison was awarded a Fellow of the Association of Professional Recording Services (APRS) in 2015.
