= Solid State Logic SL 4000 =

Series of large-format analogue audio consoles

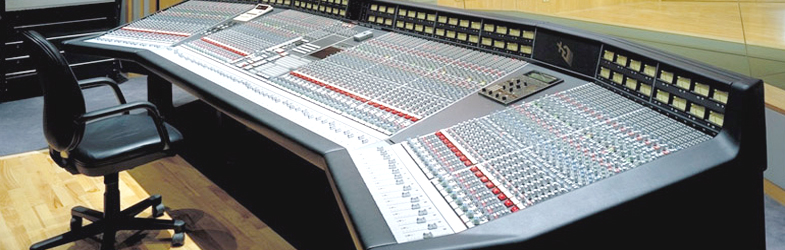
SL 4000 G+ Serial #1000 at Townhouse Studios (image reversed)

The Solid State Logic SL 4000 is a series of large-format analogue mixing consoles designed and manufactured by Solid State Logic (SSL) from 1976 to 2002. 4000 Series consoles were widely adopted by major commercial recording studios in the 1980s. In 2004, the SL 4000 was inducted into the TECnology Hall of Fame, an honor given to "products and innovations that have had an enduring impact on the development of audio technology."

== History ==
=== Origin of the SSL console ===
SSL founder Colin Sanders owned and operated Acorn Studios, a recording studio in Stonesfield, Oxfordshire. When he sought a recording console with routing flexibility and settings recall unavailable on recording consoles at that time, Sanders applied his experience to design and build a mixing console himself, resulting in the SL 4000 A Series large-format analogue mixing console, which featured one-button switching between recording, tracking and mixdown modes. A total of two SL 4000 A Series consoles were built, the beginning of a series of products that would define and establish SSL as a company over the next two decades.

=== B Series ===
The SL 4000 B Series, introduced in 1976, revolutionized the recording industry by combining the in-line mixing console with a computer which provided fader automation and programmable tape transport auto-location functionality., The B Series was in production for four years, during which a total of six B Series consoles were built and sold, the first B Series console purchased by Abbey Road Studios in London, England. The second B Series console was purchased by Le Studio in Morin-Heights, Canada, where it was used in the recording of such notable albums as Moving Pictures and several subsequent Rush albums, as well as Bryan Adams Cuts Like a Knife. Kendun Recorders in Burbank, California also purchased an SL 4000 B.

Another early SL 4000 B was purchased by Virgin Records' Townhouse Studios in London, and it was with that console that engineer Hugh Padgham accidentally discovered gated reverb while recording Phil Collins' drum parts for Peter Gabriel's 1980 song "Intruder". The console featured a "Listen Mic", or reverse talkback function intended to allow a musician in the studio to communicate with control room personnel via an overhead microphone. To compensate for sound level differences of musicians that may or may not be near the microphone, SSL's "Listen Mic" circuit employed gating and extreme compression, so when Padgham activated the "Listen Mic" while Collins was talking and playing, it resulted in the gated reverb drum sound. Padgham and producer Steve Lilywhite liked the sound so much that they had the console modified overnight to enable recording of the console's talkback circuit. Collins, Lilywhite, and Padgham again used the effect on Collins' signature 1981 single "In the Air Tonight", and the gated reverb drum sound technique became widely used and imitated throughout the 1980s, with SSL revising the design of future consoles so that the "Listen Mic" could be recorded without any modification. Other notable albums recorded by Lillywhite on Townhouse's SL 4000 B included XTC's Drums and Wires and Simple Minds' Once Upon a Time.

=== E and G Series ===
The SL 4000 E Series, introduced in 1979, combined the functionality of a mixing console with centralized signal processing control, machine control, fader automation, and Total Recall, which enabled the user to save the settings of all of the mixers' rotary controls on a 5¼ inch floppy disk and recall those settings via a color-coded display; on these early consoles, recall meant the display guided the operator in manually realigning each physical control to its stored position, rather than resetting the controls automatically. The E Series offered sonic improvements, increased routing flexibility, a new 4-band EQ section developed in collaboration with George Martin (now commonly referred to as the "Black Knob" EQ), and was the first console to offer a compressor/gate on every channel as well as a master bus compressor.

The combination of the ability to save and recall mixer settings, a dedicated dynamics section, and a dedicated compressor/gate/expander and parametric EQ on every channel, and SSL's flexible routing drove widespread adoption of the SL 4000 E Series consoles and its successors and variants in professional recording studios; and in 1996, Billboard's Studio Action Chart reported that 83% of number-one singles that year had been produced using an SSL board. The company claims that more platinum albums have been recorded on SSL mixing consoles than any other company's equipment combined.

The first two 4000 E consoles were purchased by Battery Studios and RG Jones Recording Studios, closely followed by Eden Studios and Sarm Studios. Hansa Tonstudio purchased three custom SL 4000 E consoles in "Hansa blue"; two of these consoles are still in use.

SSL introduced the SL 4000 G Series at the AES New York Convention in 1987, which again offered a redesigned EQ, among other improvements.

The SL 4000 E Series and G Series consoles were later also made available in 5000 Series, 6000 Series, and 8000 Series formats, which offered various routing and bussing configurations to address the needs of sound for the recording, film, video, and broadcast markets.

== Notable users ==
Notable mixing engineers using SL 4000 Series consoles include Bob Clearmountain, Steve Lillywhite, Chris Lord-Alge, Tom Lord-Alge, Andy Wallace, Mark "Spike" Stent, Will Schillinger, Alan Moulder, Dr. Dre and Trevor Horn.

== Second-hand market ==
Even though Solid State Logic ceased manufacturing SL 4000 Series consoles in 2002, there is still demand for these large-format analog recording consoles which supports a large second-hand market and a number of third-party companies offering spare parts.

The SL 4000 B serial number 11, originally purchased by Le Studio in Montreal where it was used from 1980 to 1985, recording such albums as Rush's Moving Pictures, is now in use at Tree Sound Studios in Atlanta.

The SL 4000 E serial number #001 is currently in service at Sonic Ranch Recording Studios in Tornillo, Texas. The SL 4000 E (with upgraded G+ computer) from Genesis' The Farm Studio now in use at Essex Recording Studios. The SL 4000 E originally built in 1984 for Battery Studios in London was purchased and refurbished in 2018 for use at 2noisy studio in Azpetia, Spain.

The SL 4000 G+ Special Edition console previously used at Roundhouse Recording Studios in London was purchased by Massive Attack in 2005 for use in their new studio facility. The SL 4000 G+ from Eden Studios is now in use at Blue Bell Hill in Kent, England. SL 4000 G+ previously used at Real World Studios and at AIR Studios is now in use at Abbey Recording Company.

== Recreations and software emulations ==
The signature sounds of the SSL 4000 E Series EQ, as well as the G Series EQ and Bus Compressor are still in demand, and as such they have been re-created by SSL and included as a feature marketed in new SSL products.

Additionally, SSL and Universal Audio have developed and introduced SSL-branded software plug-in recreations of those E Series and G Series console features.
