= Microphone preamplifier =

Circuit for amplifying microphone signals

The term microphone preamplifier can either refer to the electronic circuitry within a microphone, or to a separate device or circuit that the microphone is connected to. In either instance, the purpose of the microphone preamplifier is the same.

A microphone preamplifier is a sound engineering device that prepares a microphone signal to be processed by other equipment. Microphone signals are often too weak to be transmitted to units such as mixing consoles and recording devices with adequate quality. Preamplifiers increase a microphone signal to line level (i.e. the level of signal strength required by such devices) by providing stable gain while preventing induced noise that would otherwise distort the signal. For additional discussion of signal level, see Gain stage.

A microphone preamplifier is colloquially called a microphone preamp, mic preamp, micamp, preamp (not to be confused with a control amplifier in high-fidelity reproduction equipment), mic pre and pre.

== Technical details ==
The output voltage on a dynamic microphone may be very low, typically in the 1 to 100 microvolt range. A microphone preamplifier increases that level by up to 70 dB, to anywhere up to 10 volts. This stronger signal is used to drive equalization circuitry within an audio mixer, to drive external audio effects, and to sum with other signals to create an audio mix for audio recording or for live sound.

== Functions ==
In addition to providing gain for the microphone signal, a microphone preamplifier as found in a sound mixer or as a discrete component typically also provides power to the microphone in the form of either 24 or 48 volt phantom power.

== In use ==
A microphone is a transducer and as such is the source of much of the coloration of an audio mix. Most audio engineers would assert that a microphone preamplifier also affects the sound quality of an audio mix. A preamplifier might load the microphone with low impedance, forcing the microphone to work harder and so change its tone quality. A preamplifier might add coloration by adding a different characteristic than the audio mixer's built-in preamplifiers. Some microphones, for example condensers, must be used in conjunction with an impedance matching preamplifier to function correctly.

Some preamplifiers exist as one part of a channel strip, which can include other kinds of audio recording devices such as compressors, equalization (EQ), noise gates, and enhancers.
