= Neve Electronics =

English audio equipment manufacturer

- Industry: Professional audio design & engineering
- Founded: 1961
- Key people: Rupert Neve

Neve Electronics (/ˈniːv/ NEEV) was a manufacturer of music recording and broadcast mixing consoles and hardware. It was founded in 1961 by Rupert Neve, who is credited with creating the modern mixing console.

== History ==
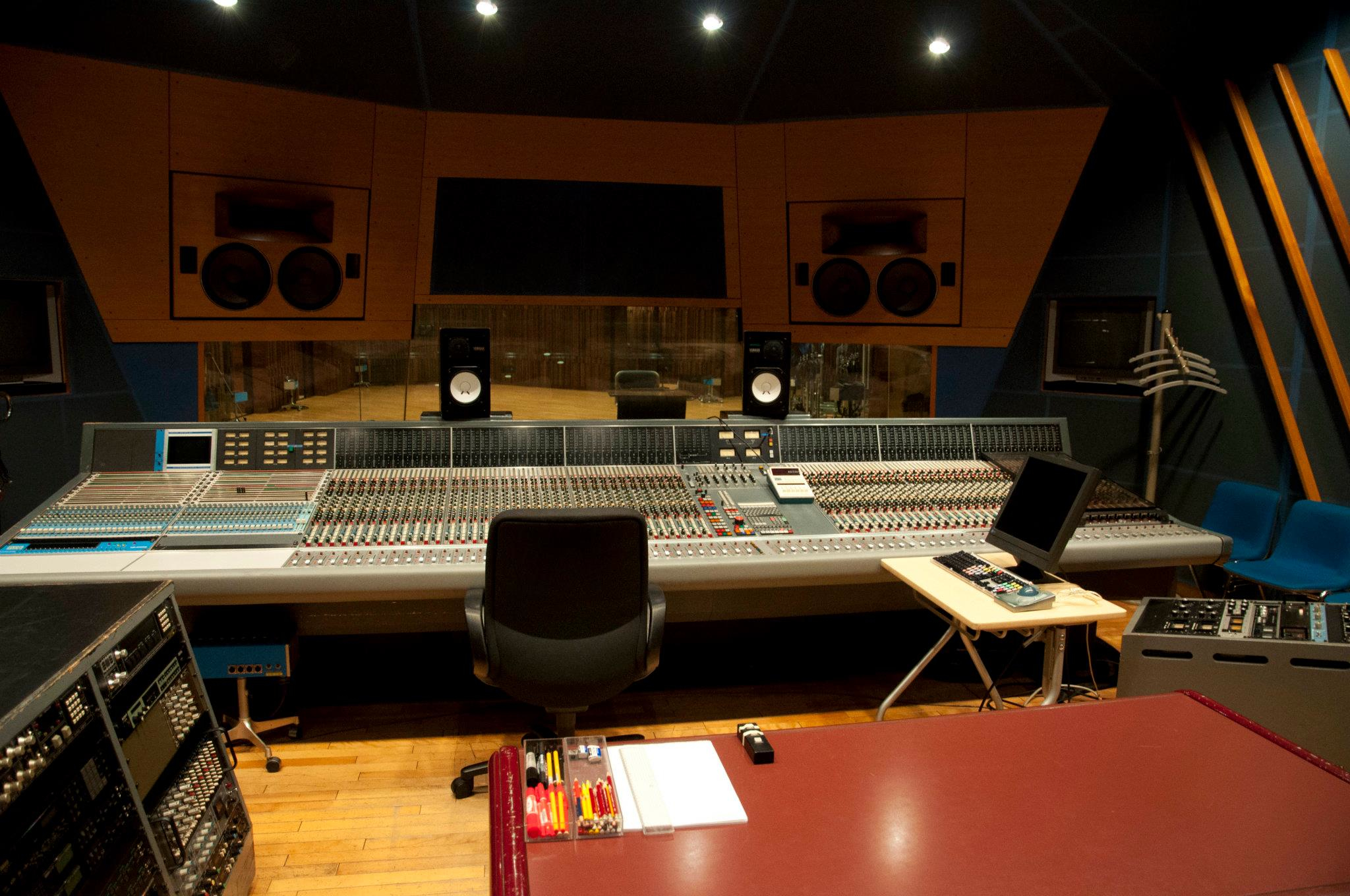
Neve VR-72 with Flying Faders, Studio 1 Control Room Center

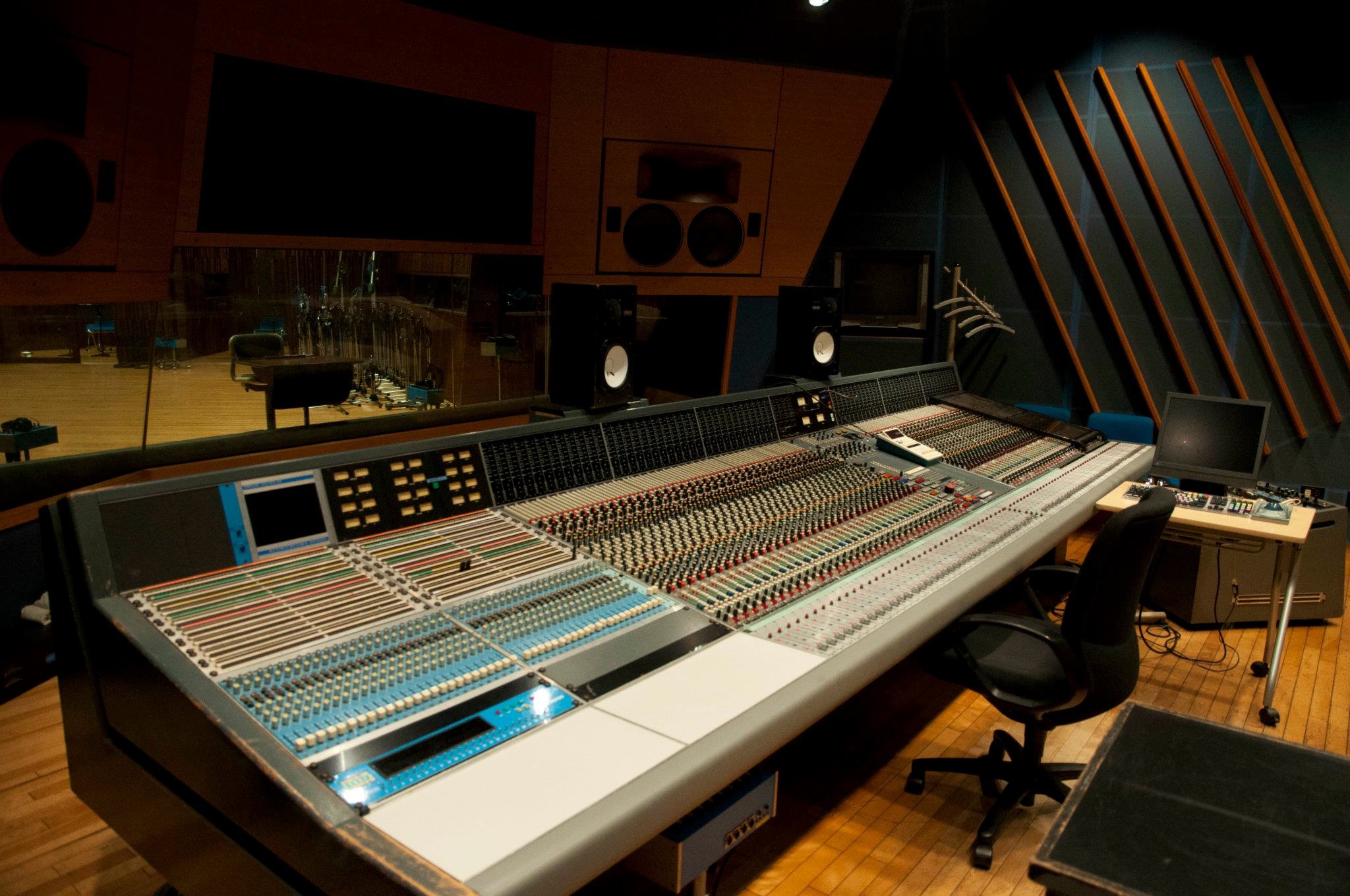
Studio 1 Control Room Left Quarter

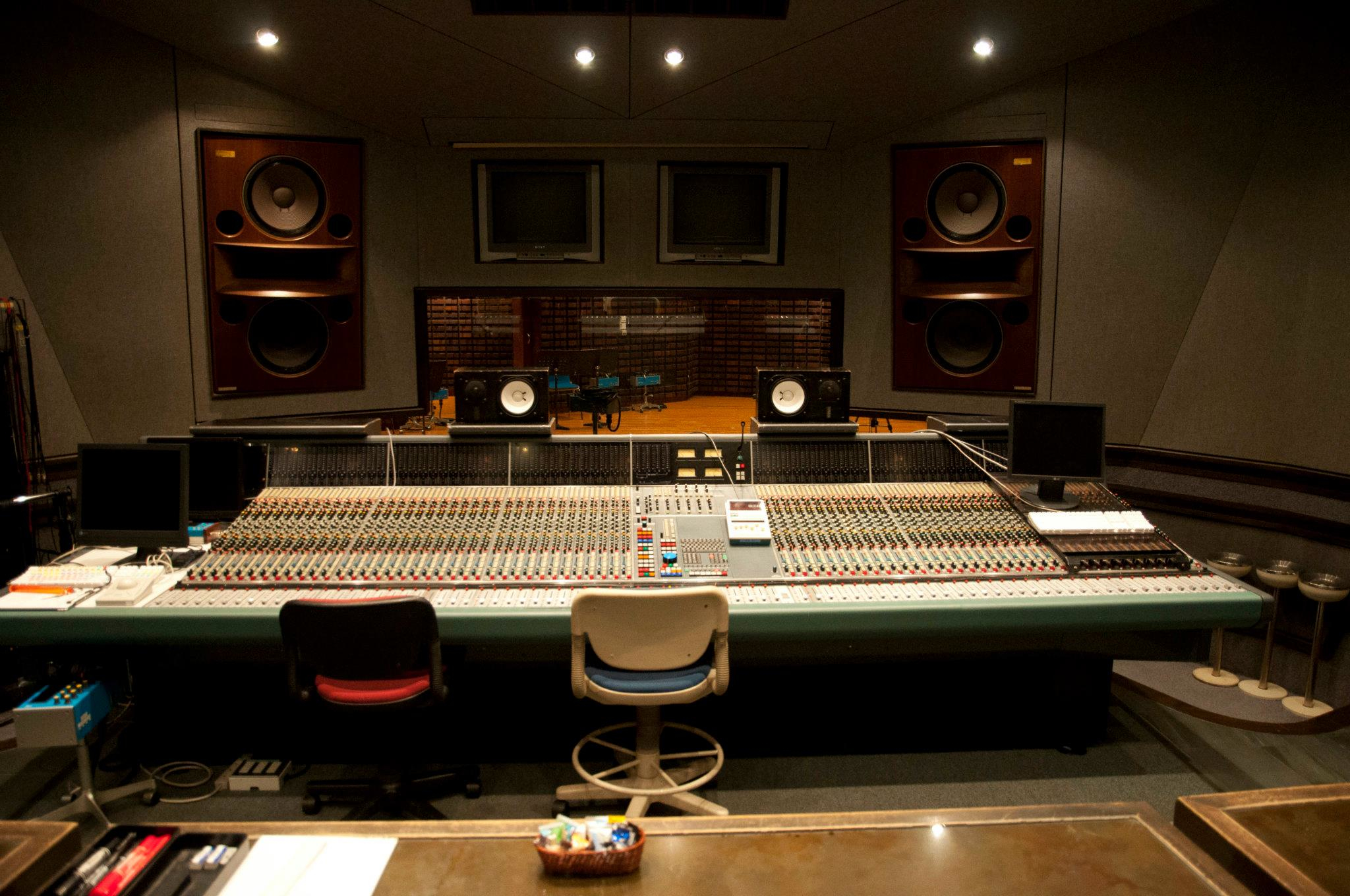
Studio 3 Control Room Center

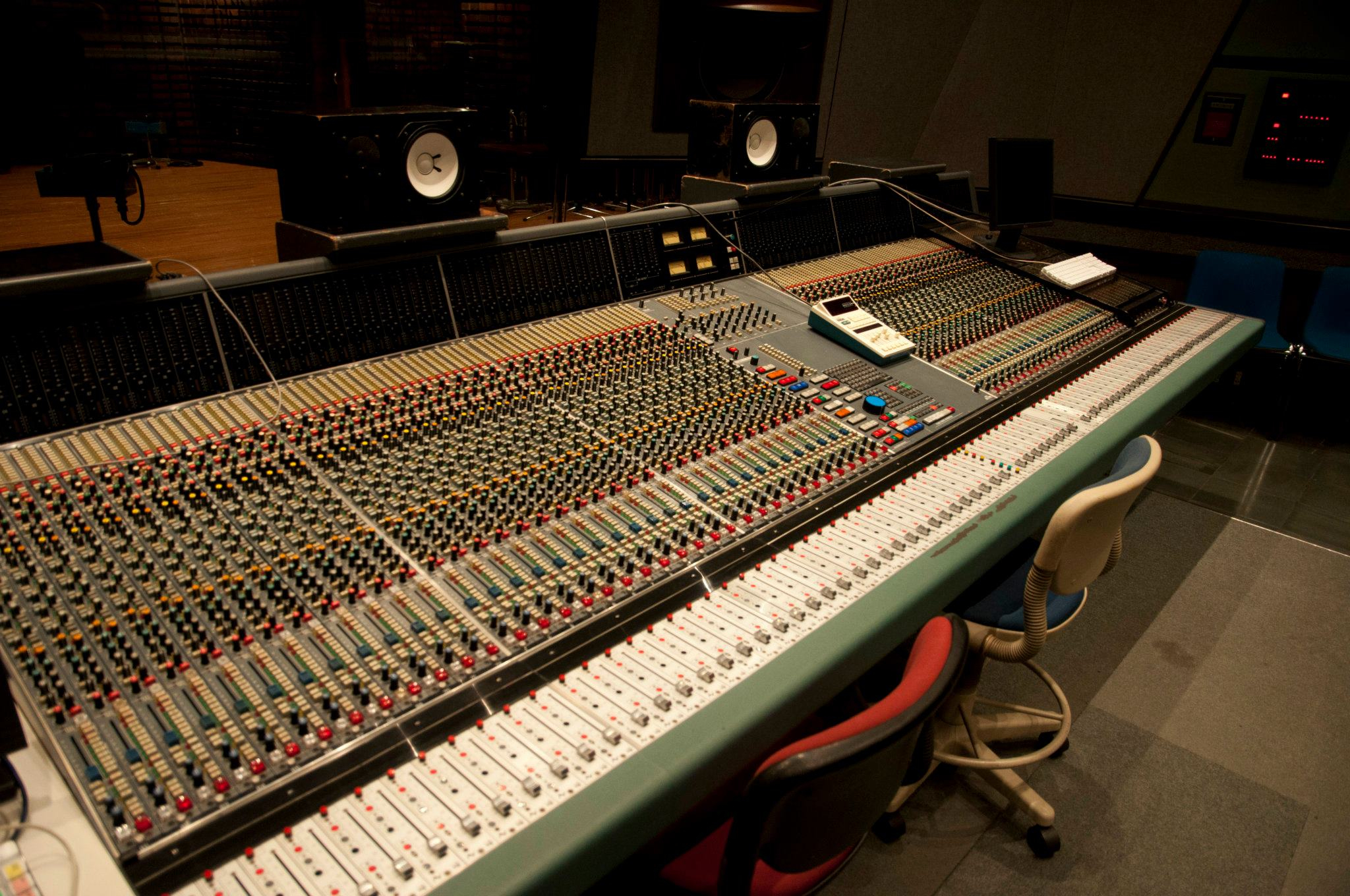
Studio 3 Control Room Left Quarter

=== Company formation ===
Rupert Neve formed Neve Electronics in 1961. The company specialised in producing professional audio equipment and mixing consoles. The products used high-quality components and utilized Class-A circuit designs. In 1964 the company moved to Cambridgeshire. That year Neve Electronics built one of the first transistor-based mixing consoles for Philips Studios in London. The company moved to a purpose-built factory in Melbourn, near Cambridge where in 1968 they designed the 2254 compressor limiter for ABC Weekend TV in the UK. It was also in 1968 that Neve Electronics began to distribute their products in North America. Vanguard Records, of New York City, was the first American recording studio to take possession of the Neve console in October, 1968.

=== 1970s ===
In 1970, Rupert Neve designed the 1073 module for the new A88 mixing console; this console was designed for Wessex Studios. During the seventies Neve Electronics produced a whole series of mixing consoles for both broadcast and recording studios. In 1973, the 8048 console was produced; this included the newer 1081 microphone/line preamplifier and equaliser. In the same year Rupert Neve sold Neve Electronics to the Bonochord Group. He continued working alongside Neve Electronics until 1975 when he left altogether.

In 1977, Neve Electronics began using digital technology with the introduction of their Necam system. Necam stood for Neve Computer Assisted Mixdown. The first Necam system was installed at AIR Studios in London. Necam also gained popularity in television post production facilities, including the BBC. Before the introduction of Necam, all fader mixing had to be done as live, a considerably skilled and stressful task for any dubbing mixer. Necam allowed for fader movements to be stored and recalled at a later point, allowing the dubbing mixer to build a mix in stages and focus on the creative and artistic elements of a mix, rather than on managing the technology. For those working in television post production, this was seen as a major breakthrough. In 1979, the 8108 console was produced using both analog and digital technology. The console had assignable controls and memory mixing faders.

=== Merger with AMS ===
In the 1980s, there were concerns about Neve Electronics' financial situation. This was partly due to their ambitious investment into research and development of projects such as the DSP console and the Necam system. Another product that was included in the company's research and development programme was a digitally controlled routing system; very few of these were sold. In 1985, Neve Electronics was acquired by the Siemens group; then in 1992 the Siemens group combined Neve Electronics with another newly acquired company, Advanced Music Systems to form AMS Neve which continues to produce products under both the Neve and AMS Neve brands.

== Notable products ==
- Neve 8028 Mixing Console, "one of five in the world", "a 24-input, 16-bus, 24-monitor 8028 with 1073 or 1084 EQs and no automation"
- Neve 8048 Mixing Console
- Neve 8068 Mixing Console
- Neve 8078 Mixing Console
- Neve 2254 Compressor/Limiter
- Neve 1084 Mic Preamplifier & Equaliser

=== Neve 1073 Console Module ===
The 1073 is a Class-A design microphone/line preamplifier with three equaliser bands. The equaliser has a fixed 12kHz high frequency band and switchable low and mid range bands with cut and boost controls. There is also a passive third-order (18 dB/octave) high pass filter. Two switches were also fitted on the module's front panel for equaliser bypass and phase polarity. The 1073 module was designed to be part of the 80 series Neve console. It was never intended for use as a stand alone module. As studios closed and consoles were decommissioned over the following decades, audio engineers began removing 1073 modules and mounting them in portable racks for outboard use, a secondary market that established the 1073 as a standalone preamplifier/EQ format independent of its original console role. Its transformer-based circuitry has been described as contributing to a distinctively colored sound.

=== Neve 33609 Compressor Limiter ===
The 33609 is a 19” rack mounted compressor limiter produced by Neve Electronics for broadcast and recording purposes. The unit can be linked for stereo and multi-channel operation. The compressor processes the audio signal before the output amplifier, meaning the output level can be raised after compression of the signal. The controls include compression attack and recovery times. There is also a bypass control to switch the effect in or out of the circuit. Other configurations were available at the time of the product's release. The Neve 33609 compressor limiter was re-designed around 2009 by AMS Neve and labelled as the 33609JD stereo compressor.

== Timeline ==
- 1961: Company based at Harlow.
- 1964: Moved to the Priesthaus in Little Shelford.
- 1966: The Neve Group of Companies formed 1 December 1966 to take over business run privately by Rupert Neve.
- 1966: Consoles made for the TV Centre, Madrid.
- 1969: First broadcast consoles for ABC Weekend TV and Granada TV.
- 1969: First consoles to the USA: Sound Studios, Van Nuys, CA and Vanguard studios in New York. First 16 track consoles.
- 1970: First console to AIR Studios, first desk for BBC TV Lime Grove Studios, a standard 8008 24/8 costing £15,000.
- 1970: Rupert Neve Incorporated (USA) formed April 1970.
- 1970: Rupert Neve Canada formed (sales company) 10 September 1970
- 1973: Neve group of companies purchased by Bononchord (later named ESE Energy Services and Equipment) with Robin Rigby as Chairman.
- 1975: Rupert Neve leaves the company under contract to not produce a similar product for ten years (i.e. Focusrite 1985).
- 1977: 8058 and 8068 Mark 1, 5312, 5315
- 1978: Rupert Neve and Company Ltd becomes Neve Electronics International on April 1, 1978.
- 1978: Neve digital design department formed.
- 1985: Neve taken over by Siemens AG (Austria) end 1985.
- 1992: Company is amalgamated with AMS in Burnley with remaining staff either moving to Burnley or the London Sales Office. Company now called AMS Neve.
- 2005: AMS Neve acquired by SAE Institute.
- 2010: SAE sells its interests in AMS Neve back to Mark Crabtree.
