= Cable management =

Tidily securing cables

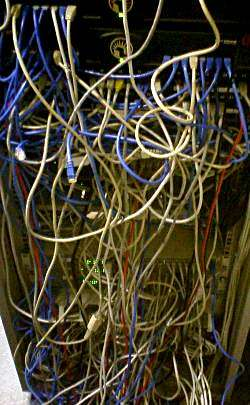
A bad case of "cable spaghetti"

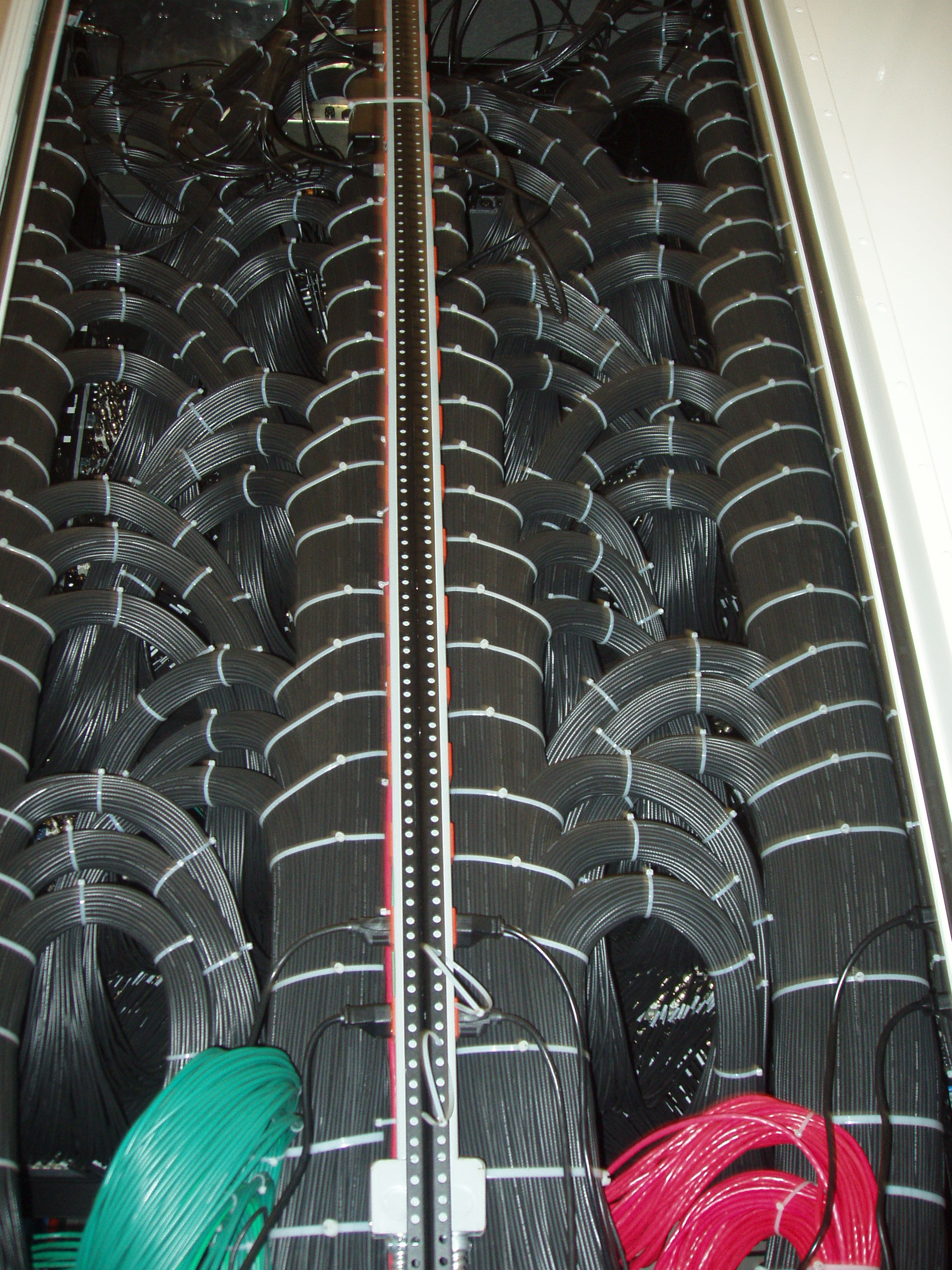
Cabling secured with cable ties

Cable management refers to management of electrical or optical cable in a cabinet or an installation. The term is used for products, workmanship or planning. Cables can easily become tangled, making them difficult to work with, sometimes resulting in devices accidentally becoming unplugged as one attempts to move a cable. Such cases are known as "cable spaghetti", and any kind of problem diagnosis and future updates to such enclosures could be very difficult.

Cable management both supports and contains cables during installation, and makes subsequent maintenance or changes to the cable system easier. Products such as cable trays, cable ladders, and cable baskets are used to support a cable through cabling routes.

== Cable selection ==
The choice of cables is also important; for instance, ribbon cables used to connect Parallel ATA drives to the motherboard can disrupt the airflow inside of computers, making case fans less effective; most SATA cables are more compact and therefore do not have this problem.

== Cable labeling ==
Color-coding of cables is sometimes used to keep track of which is which. For instance, the wires coming out of ATX power supplies are color-coded by voltage. Documenting and labeling cable runs, tying related cables together by cable ties, cable lacing, rubber bands or other means, running them through cable guides, and clipping or stapling them to walls are other common methods of keeping them organized. Above drop ceilings, hooks or trays are used to organize cables and protect them from electrical interference

Planning is especially crucial for cables such as thicknet that do not bend around corners easily and fiber optic which is very difficult to splice once cut.

== Cable strain relief ==
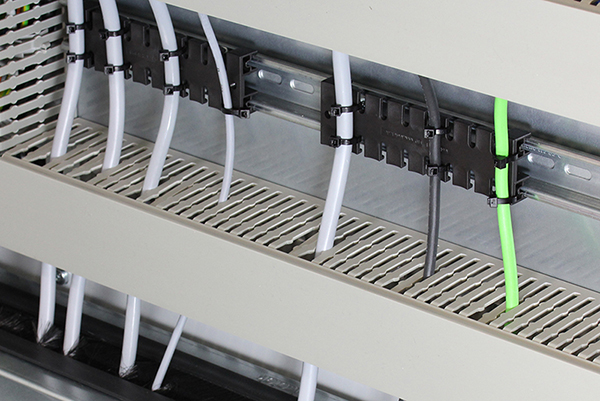
Strain relief plate inside an electrical enclosure, mounted on a 35 mm DIN rail shape H

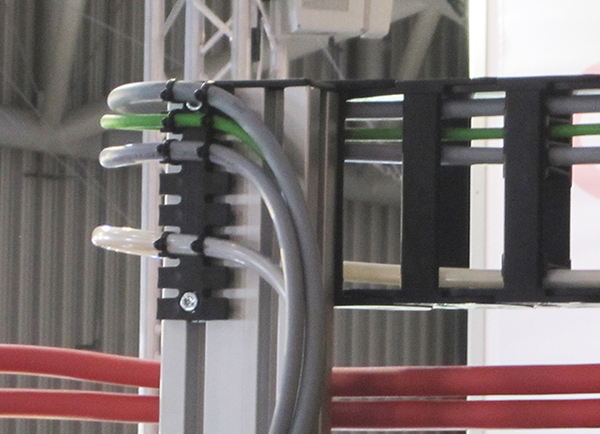
Strain relief plate on the end of a cable carrier

Cable strain relief is a mechanical protection for flexible electrical cables, wires, conduits and pneumatic hoses. It is regulated by the European standard EN 62444 (formerly EN 50262.).

With a strain relief component, the connection between a flexible electrical line and its connection port is protected against mechanical stress. Usually, the lines are fixed by clamping them into single cable clamps made of plastic or metal. Another possibility is to use so-called cord grips which consist of weaved wire strands that put a grip around the cables.

A more cable-friendly alternative is attaching the lines to special strain relief plates using common cable ties. In case of industrial applications these strain relief plates are also cost-effective because the packing density (meaning the possible number of lines to be fixed on one plate) is much higher than with common cable clamps which are normally designed for holding one single line.

Furthermore, most of the available cable clamps are not very flexible when it comes to routing lines with varying diameters. That causes higher acquisition and storage costs. The installation of the single cable clamps can take a lot of mounting time, depending on the laying length of the lines. Strain relief plates are therefore a more flexible solution which allows a parallel routing of several lines with varying diameters.

Strain relief is often required for terminated electrical lines that are plugged into sockets or ports to prevent unplugging or accidentally ripping out of the connector. At which point the lines have to be strain relieved depends on the application. For PROFINET, for example, which is used in automation it is recommended to set the strain relief component approx. 1 m / 3.5 ft from the connection point.

Strain relief components are also used in applications where cables, conduits and hoses are exposed to constant dynamic stress (cable carriers / drag chains).

== Computer data cabling, structured cabling, LAN cabling ==
Generally, one end of a cable is terminated in the data cabinet. The other end of a cable ends at the desk. The cable management needs at either end are different.

Buildings and office furniture are often designed with cable management in mind; for instance, desks sometimes have holes to pass cables, and dropped ceilings, raised floors and in-floor cellular raceway systems provide easy access. Some cables have requirements for minimum bending radius or proximity to other cables, particularly power cables, to avoid crosstalk or interference. Power cables often need to be grouped separately and suitably apart from data cables, and only cross at right angles which minimizes electromagnetic interference.

The organized routing of cables inside the computer case allows for optimal airflow and cooling. Good cable management also makes working inside a computer much easier by providing safer hardware installation, repair, or removal. Some PC mod enthusiasts showcase the internal components of their systems with a window mod, which displays the aesthetics of internal cabling as well as the skills and wealth of the modder.

The IT industry needs data cables to be added, moved, or removed many times during the life of the installation. It is usual practice to install "fixed cables" between cabling closets or cabinets. These cables are contained in cable trays etc., and are terminated at each end onto patch panels in the communications cabinet or outlets at the desktop. The circuits are then interconnected to the final destination using patch cables.

Software, such as data center infrastructure management (DCIM), is sometimes used to manage cabling for large IT infrastructures.

== Cable planning ==
Because large IT infrastructures often encompass vast networks of cables — all of which need to be serviced, removed, added, and so on throughout an installation lifecycle — cable planning is a necessity.

An example of "cable spaghetti" featuring residential fiber optic connections in Mexico City.

Different methods of cable planning may be employed, depending upon the level of detail required for proper management. Spreadsheet software can be used for this purpose, but there is often a need to visually organize information that goes beyond the capabilities of such general-purpose software. For proper visualization of cabling, companies may opt to use a cable management software package.

== In hospitals ==
In hospital situations, cable management can be critical to preventing medical mistakes. In these settings, cable management includes tubes and hoses used for liquids and gases used in healthcare, along with electrical and other cables. Emergency room nurse manager Pat Gabriel said, "My wish is that we could somehow not have spaghetti on the bed. When you look at all those wires and those IVs, it's just spaghetti".

Cabling in healthcare facilities must be grounded, shielded and routed in accordance with life safety codes to minimize interference with medical equipment.

== In offices ==
Cables are managed by five methods in commercial buildings:

- Concrete trenching - a trench is dug into the building's concrete. Cabling and floor boxes are installed and the trench is sealed with concrete.
- Floor decking - cables are installed on the ceiling of the floor below. Holes are drilled through the floor and outlets are installed on top of the floor.
- Overhead cabling - cables are installed on the ceiling. Cable drop downs give users access to outlets.
- Access flooring - cables are installed below a raised floor.
- In Floor Cellular Raceway Systems - utilize enclosed steel raceways located within a concrete floor slab to distribute power, data, and telecom cabling throughout a space to any location where these services are required today – and where they may be required in the future.

Cord concealers (also called cord protectors) are commonly used in offices to prevent accidents while protecting the cord and the appliance its attached to. Office furniture can sometimes have built in cable management solutions.

== In moving equipment ==
Cable management is particularly important in powered equipment which must move large distances while tethered to a power source and control cabling. There are several common methods of cable management.

With a suspended sliding coil, the cables are coiled like a spring, with each loop of the coil attached to a sliding shoe on a track. As the cabling is paid out, the shoes slide individually along the track and the coils expand. When sliding the other direction, the coils fold back together into a compact spiral. This is also referred to as a festoon.

Folded linear cable uses either a flexible backbone shell, or a flat cable folded into an arc along its long axis. This style of cabling is very common in computer printers to connect the printhead to the circuitry, but is also used in very large linear moving gantries. The cables are flexed only in a small region in a tight radius and so need to be very flexible.

== See also ==
- Cable harness
- Cable entry system
- Cable grommet
- Cable gland
- Cable tray
- Cable dressing
- Underwriter's knot
