= Igus =

German manufacturing company

igus
- Industry: High-performance plastics
- Founded: 1964
- Founder: Günter Blase
- Headquarters: Cologne, Germany
- Area served: Worldwide
- Products: Plain bearing, cable carriers, flexible cables, connectors, robotic components, 3D printed products, ball bearings
- Website: igus igus UK

igus is a German manufacturer and distributor of technical products made of high-performance plastics, including plastic plain bearings, flexible cables, energy chains, connectors, robotic components, 3D-printed products and ball bearings.

igus was first described as a hidden champion in 2012.

== History ==
Günter Blase established igus on 15 October 1964 in his double garage in Cologne, Germany. For the first 20 years the company worked as a supplier of complex technical polymer components. However, in 1983 Günter Blase's son, Frank Blase, established reinforced plastic cable-carrier systems and injection moulded polymer bearings as two distinct product groups and set up a network of sales engineers.

Between 1985 and 2018, igus has grown from 40 to around 3500 employees distributed between the head office in Germany and 38 subsidiary companies around the world. igus also has representative partners in more than 21 other countries.

igus uses the term triboplastics to describe its injection-molded polymers. They are tribologically optimized material compounds designed for low wear and long life and form the basis for all igus' products and systems.

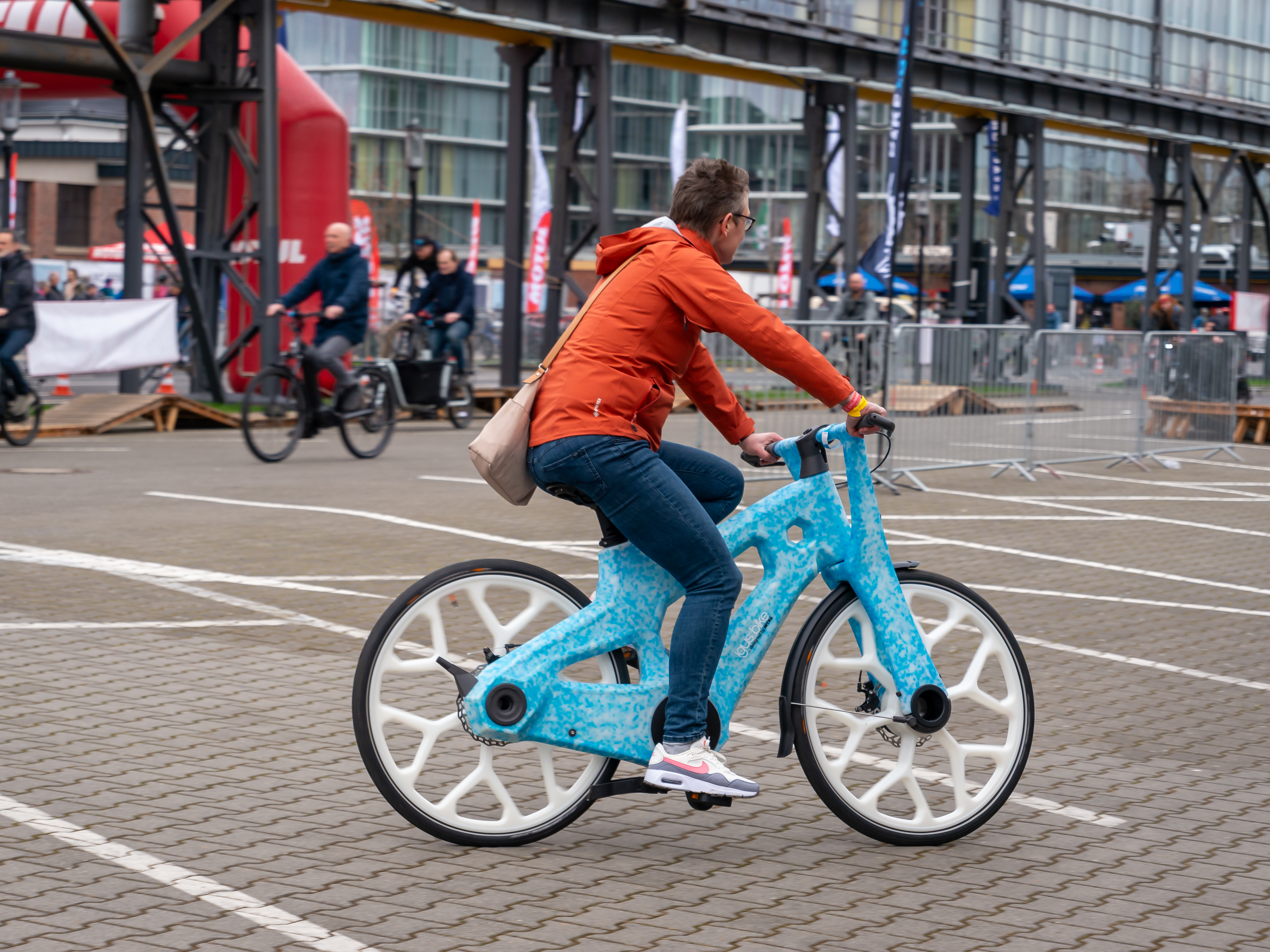
Bicycle made from recycled plastics by Igus

== igus UK ==
igus UK opened in 1991 in Daventry, Northampton. In 2000, the office moved to Moulton Park, and in 2006 to Brackmills. The office was extended in 2017. The UK subsidiary stocks approximately 6 million parts, and has around 100 employees across the United Kingdom and Ireland.

igus UK has been certified for the ISO 9001:2015 Certificate of Approval, applicable to "supply and technical support for igus the-echain systems, chainflex cables and readychain, igus dry-tech and accessories".

== South-east Asia ==
igus Singapore Pte Ltd was established in 1997 and is the headquarters office for the south-east Asian market. The company has since launched local subsidiaries in Malaysia (2008), Thailand (2013), Indonesia (2013), Vietnam (2013) and the Philippines.
