= Drag chain =

Drag chain may refer to:

- Cable carrier in moving machinery
- Drag conveyor, for moving bulk material
- A type of chain shift in linguistics
- Part of a dragline excavator
- Chain used to slow a ship during a ship launching
