= Cable dressing =

Neat arrangement of electrical cables

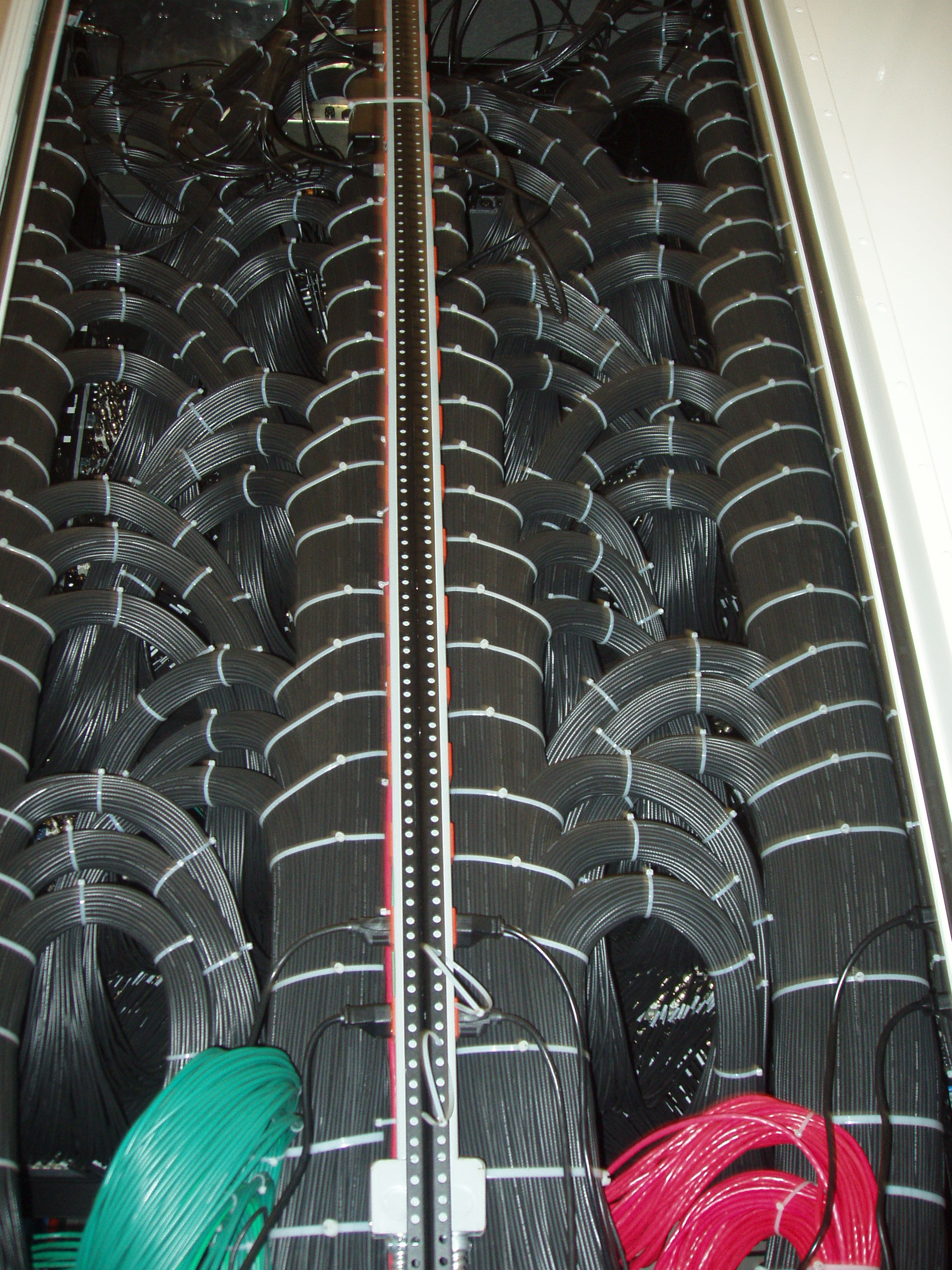
Cable dressing is critical in order to maintain neatness and reduce space usage and interference

Cable dressing ensures that electrical cables used in a telecommunications facility are neatly arranged. Cable ties, cable channels and cable lacing cord are used to accomplish this.

High tension cables are often arranged in a trefoil pattern to allow cable cleats to have sufficient strength with the high forces experienced under short circuit conditions.
