= Electrical cable =

Assembly of one or more wires running side by side or bundled

Electrical cable diagram

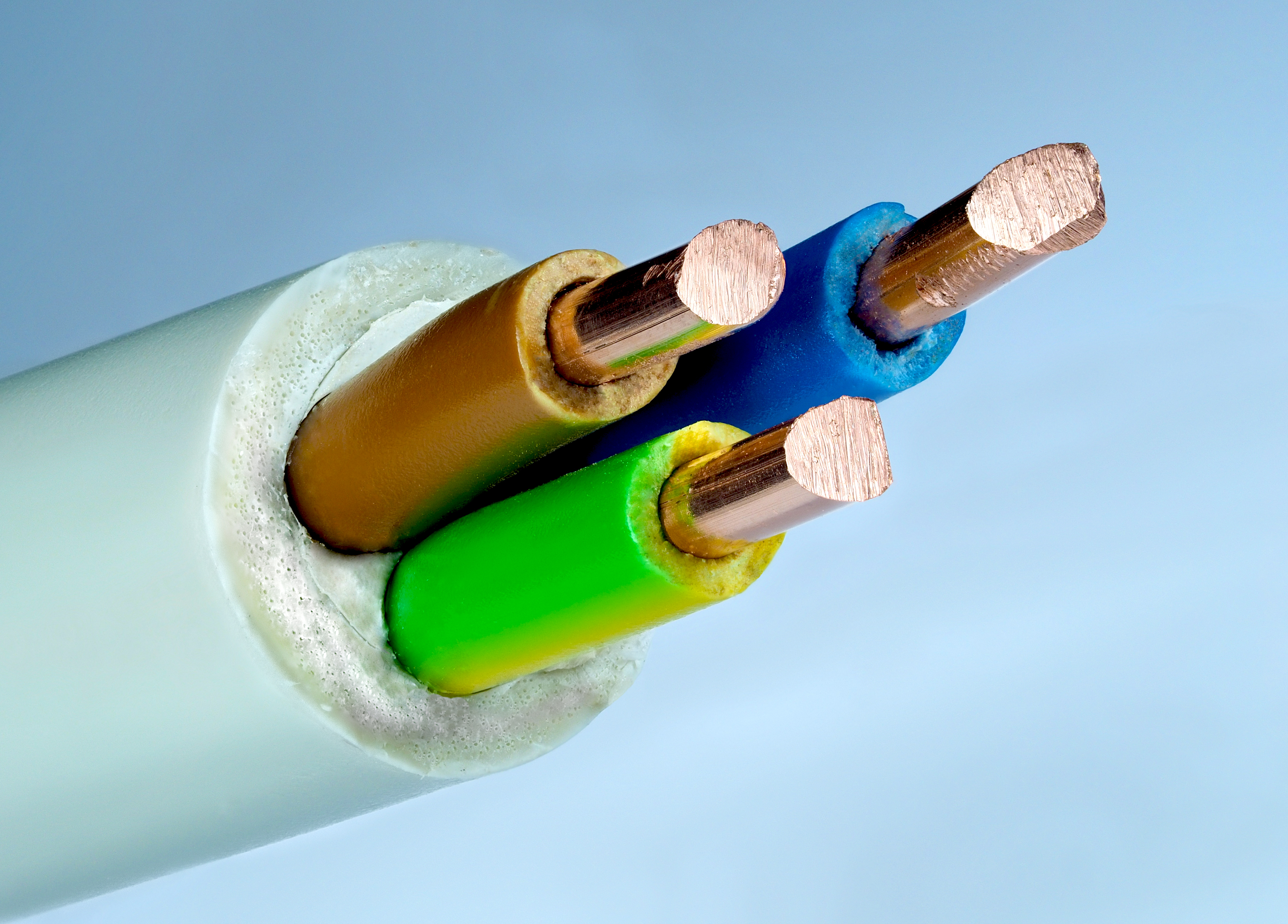
Fixed wiring mains cable with three 2.5 mm solid copper conductors

An electrical cable is an assembly of one or more wires running side by side or bundled, which is used as an electrical conductor to carry electric current.

Electrical cables are used to connect two or more devices, enabling the transfer of electrical signals, power, or both from one device to the other. Physically, an electrical cable is an assembly consisting of one or more conductors with their own insulations and optional screens, individual coverings, assembly protection and protective covering.

One or more electrical cables and their corresponding connectors may be formed into a cable assembly, which is not necessarily suitable for connecting two devices but can be a partial product (e.g. to be soldered onto a printed circuit board with a connector mounted to the housing). Cable assemblies can also take the form of a cable tree or cable harness, used to connect many terminals together.

== Uses ==
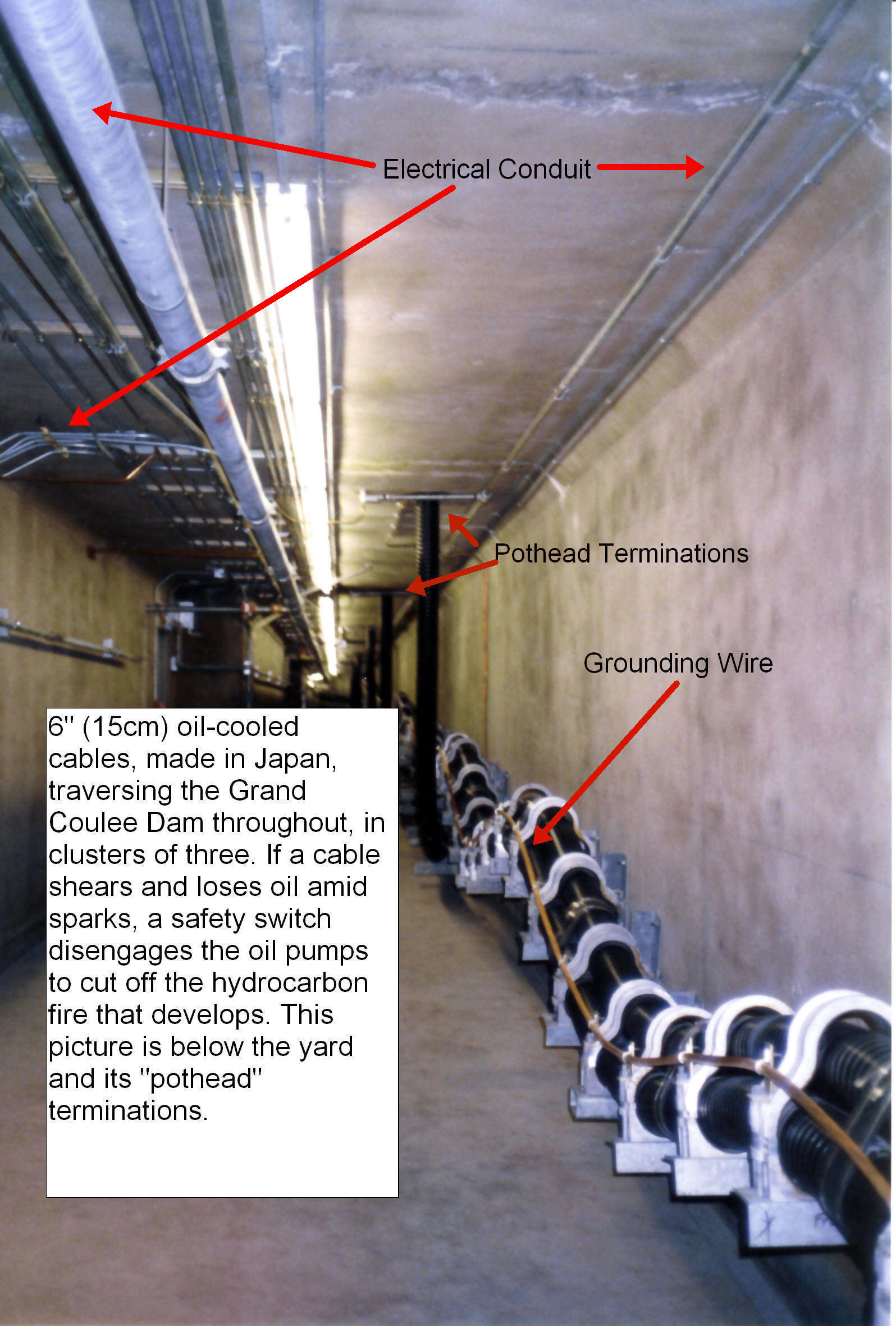
6 inch (15 cm) outside diameter, oil-cooled cables, traversing the Grand Coulee Dam throughout. An example of a heavy cable for power transmission.

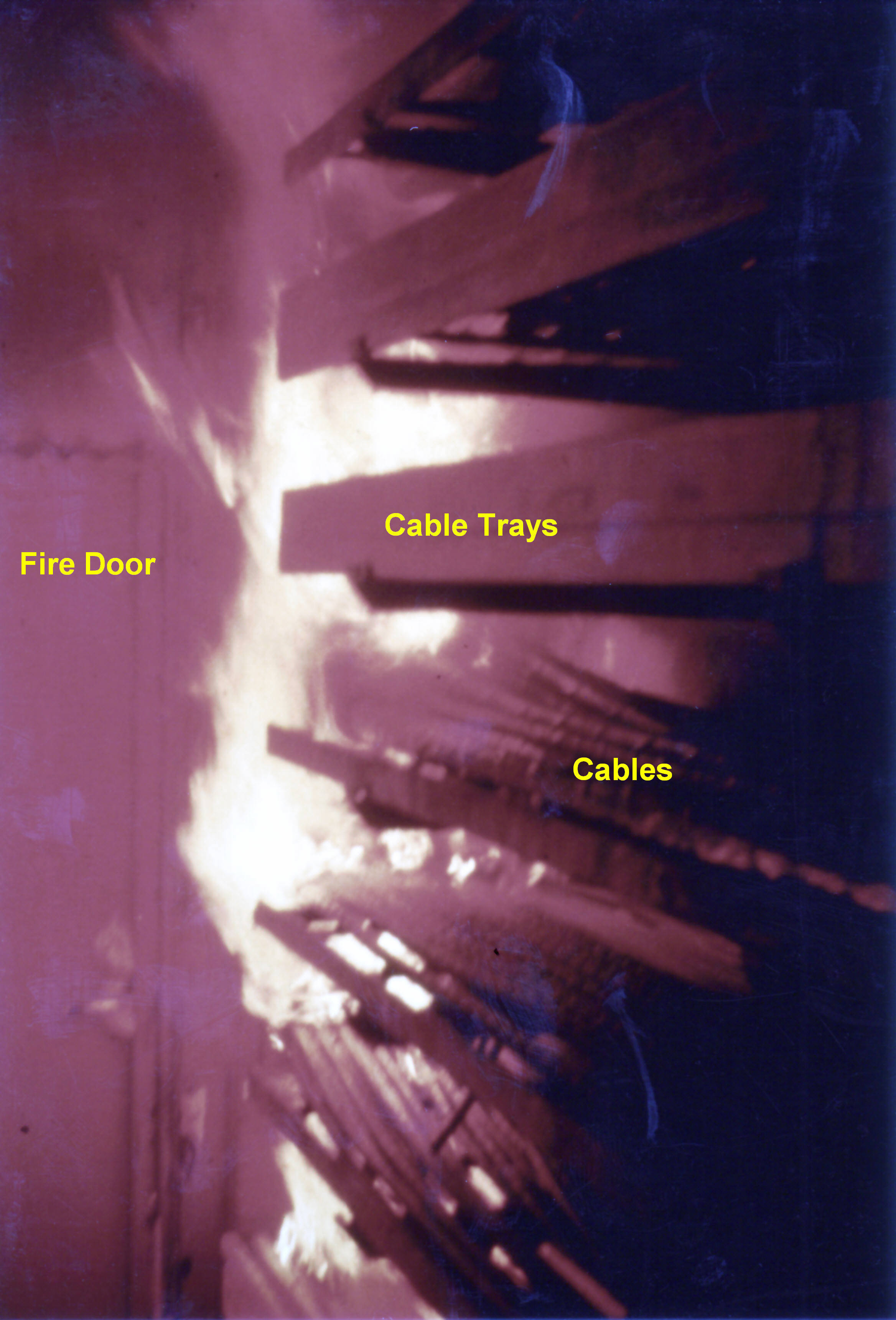
Fire test in Sweden, showing fire rapidly spreading through the burning of cable insulation, a phenomenon of great importance for cables used in some installations.

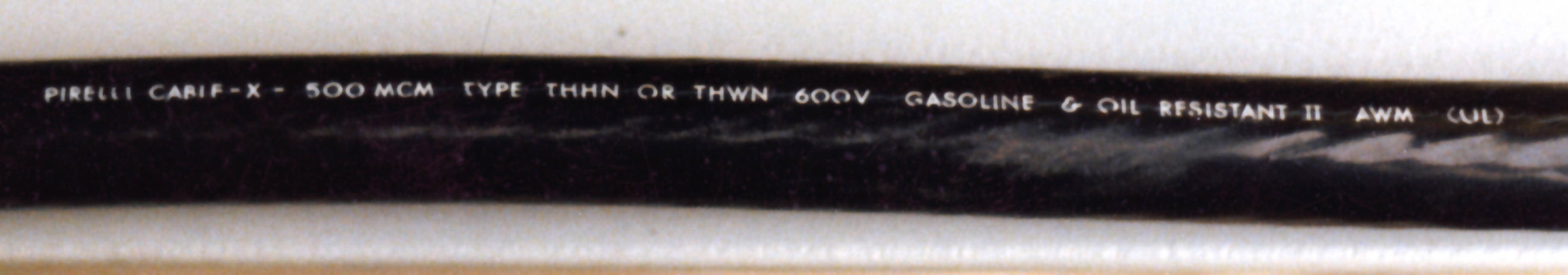
500,000 circular mil (254 mm^{2}) single-conductor power cable

Electrical cables are used to connect two or more devices, enabling the transfer of electrical signals or power from one device to the other. Long-distance communication takes place over undersea communication cables. Power cables are used for bulk transmission of alternating and direct current power, especially using high-voltage cable. Electrical cables are extensively used in building wiring for lighting, power and control circuits permanently installed in buildings. Since all the circuit conductors required can be installed in a cable at one time, installation labor is saved compared to certain other wiring methods.

Physically, an electrical cable is an assembly consisting of one or more conductors with their own insulations and optional screens, individual coverings, assembly protection and protective coverings. Electrical cables may be made more flexible by stranding the wires. In this process, smaller individual wires are twisted or braided together to produce larger wires that are more flexible than solid wires of similar size. Bunching small wires before concentric stranding adds the most flexibility. Copper wires in a cable may be bare, or they may be plated with a thin layer of another metal, most often tin, but sometimes gold, silver or another material. Tin, gold, and silver are much less prone to oxidation than copper, which may lengthen wire life, and makes soldering easier. Tinning is also used to provide lubrication between strands. Tinning was used to help removal of rubber insulation. Tight lays during stranding make the cable extensible (CBA – as in telephone handset cords).

In the 19th century and early 20th century, electrical cable was often insulated using cloth, rubber or paper. Plastic materials are generally used today, except for high-reliability power cables. The first thermoplastic used was gutta-percha (a natural latex) which was found useful for underwater cables in the 19th century. The first, and still very common, man-made plastic used for cable insulation was polyethylene. This was invented in 1930, but not available outside military use until after World War 2 during which a telegraph cable using it was laid across the English Channel to support troops following D-Day.

Cables can be securely fastened and organized, such as by using trunking, cable trays, cable ties or cable lacing. Continuous-flex or flexible cables used in moving applications within cable carriers can be secured using strain relief devices or cable ties.

== Characteristics ==
Coaxial cable

Twisted pair cabling

Any current-carrying conductor, including a cable, radiates an electromagnetic field. Likewise, any conductor or cable will pick up energy from any existing electromagnetic field around it. These effects are often undesirable, in the first case amounting to unwanted transmission of energy which may adversely affect nearby equipment or other parts of the same piece of equipment; and in the second case, unwanted pickup of noise which may mask the desired signal being carried by the cable, or, if the cable is carrying power supply or control voltages, pollute them to such an extent as to cause equipment malfunction.

The first solution to these problems is to keep cable lengths in buildings short since pick up and transmission are essentially proportional to the length of the cable. The second solution is to route cables away from trouble. Beyond this, there are particular cable designs that minimize electromagnetic pickup and transmission. Three of the principal design techniques are shielding, coaxial geometry, and twisted-pair geometry.

Shielding makes use of the electrical principle of the Faraday cage. The cable is encased for its entire length in foil or wire mesh. All wires running inside this shielding layer will be to a large extent decoupled from external electrical fields, particularly if the shield is connected to a point of constant voltage, such as earth or ground. Simple shielding of this type is not greatly effective against low-frequency magnetic fields, however - such as magnetic "hum" from a nearby power transformer. A grounded shield on cables operating at 2.5 kV or more gathers leakage current and capacitive current, protecting people from electric shock and equalizing stress on the cable insulation.

Coaxial design helps to further reduce low-frequency magnetic transmission and pickup. In this design the foil or mesh shield has a circular cross section and the inner conductor is exactly at its center. This causes the voltages induced by a magnetic field between the shield and the core conductor to consist of two nearly equal magnitudes which cancel each other.

A twisted pair has two wires of a cable twisted around each other. This can be demonstrated by putting one end of a pair of wires in a hand drill and turning while maintaining moderate tension on the line. Where the interfering signal has a wavelength that is long compared to the pitch of the twisted pair, alternate lengths of wires develop opposing voltages, tending to cancel the effect of the interference.

== Fire protection ==
Electrical cable jacket material is usually constructed of flexible plastic which will burn. The fire hazard of grouped cables can be significant. Cables jacketing materials can be formulated to prevent fire spread. Alternately, fire spread amongst combustible cables can be prevented by the application of fire retardant coatings directly on the cable exterior, or the fire threat can be isolated by the installation of boxes constructed of noncombustible materials around the bulk cable installation.

== Types ==
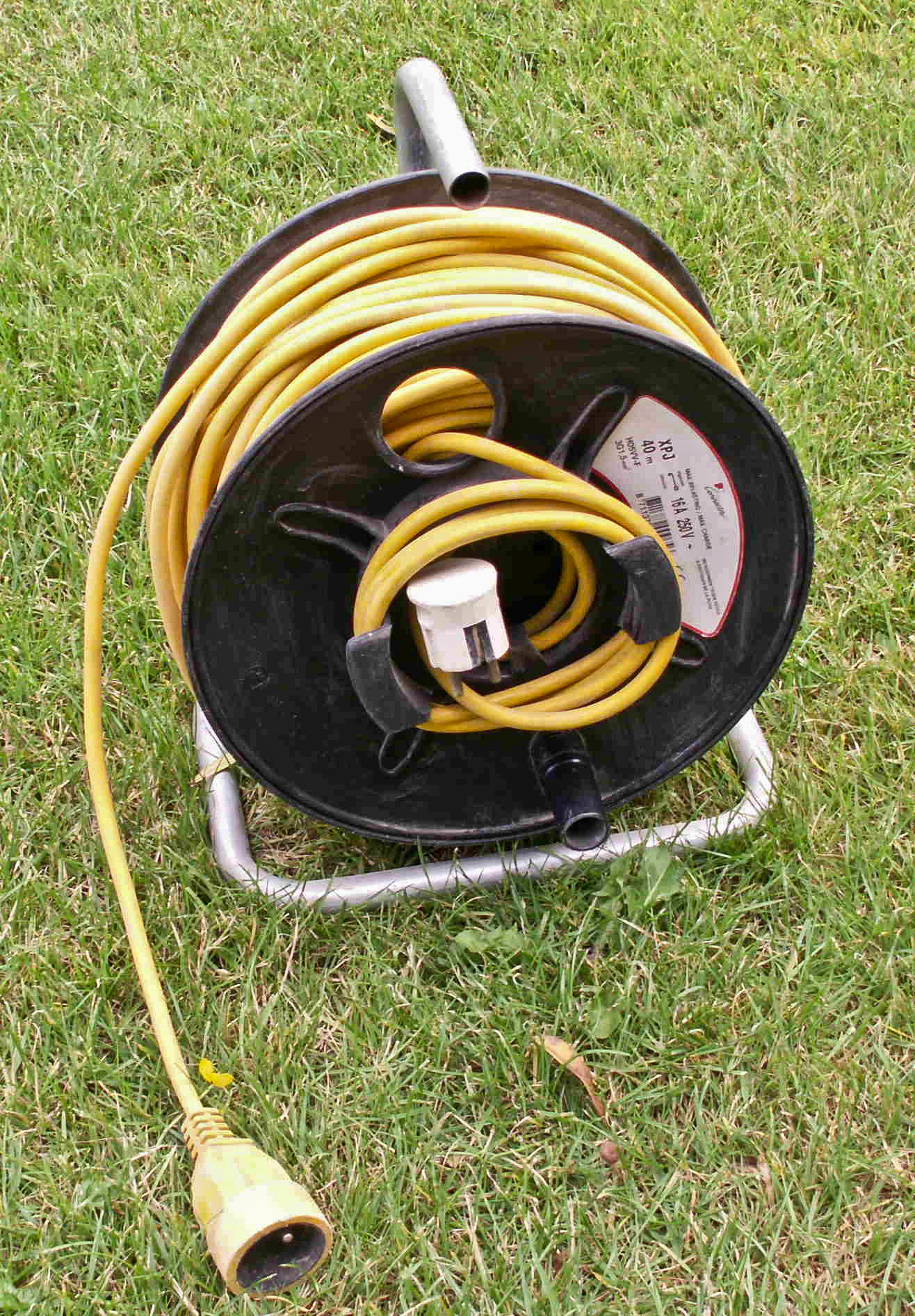
A 250 V, 16 A electrical cable on a reel

- Coaxial cable – used for radio frequency signals, for example in cable television distribution systems.
- Direct-buried cable
- Flexible cables
- Filled cable
- Heliax cable
- Non-metallic sheathed cable (or nonmetallic building wire, NM, NM-B)
- Armored cable (or BX)
- Multicore cable (consist of more than one wire and is covered by cable jacket)
- Paired cable – Composed of two individually insulated conductors that are usually used in DC or low-frequency AC applications
- Portable cord – Flexible cable for AC power in portable applications
- Power cable – A cable used for transmission of power
- Ribbon cable – Useful when many wires are required. This type of cable can easily flex, and it is designed to handle low-level voltages.
- Shielded cable – Used for sensitive electronic circuits or to provide protection in high-voltage applications.
- Single cable (from time to time this name is used for wire)
- Structured cabling
- Submersible cable
- Twin and earth
- Twinax cable
- Twin-lead – This type of cable is a flat two-wire line. It is commonly called a 300 Ω line because the line has an impedance of 300 Ω. It is often used as a transmission line between an antenna and a receiver (e.g., TV and radio). These cables are stranded to lower skin effects.
- Twisted pair – Consists of two interwound insulated wires. It resembles a paired cable, except that the paired wires are twisted

CENELEC HD 361 is a ratified standard published by CENELEC, which relates to wire and cable marking type, whose goal is to harmonize cables. Deutsches Institut für Normung (DIN, VDE) has released a similar standard (DIN VDE 0292).

== See also ==
- Wire gauge
- Cable management
- Cable gland
- Cable reel
- Circuit integrity
- Over/under cable coiling
