= Cable tie =

Ratcheting fastener for electrical cable

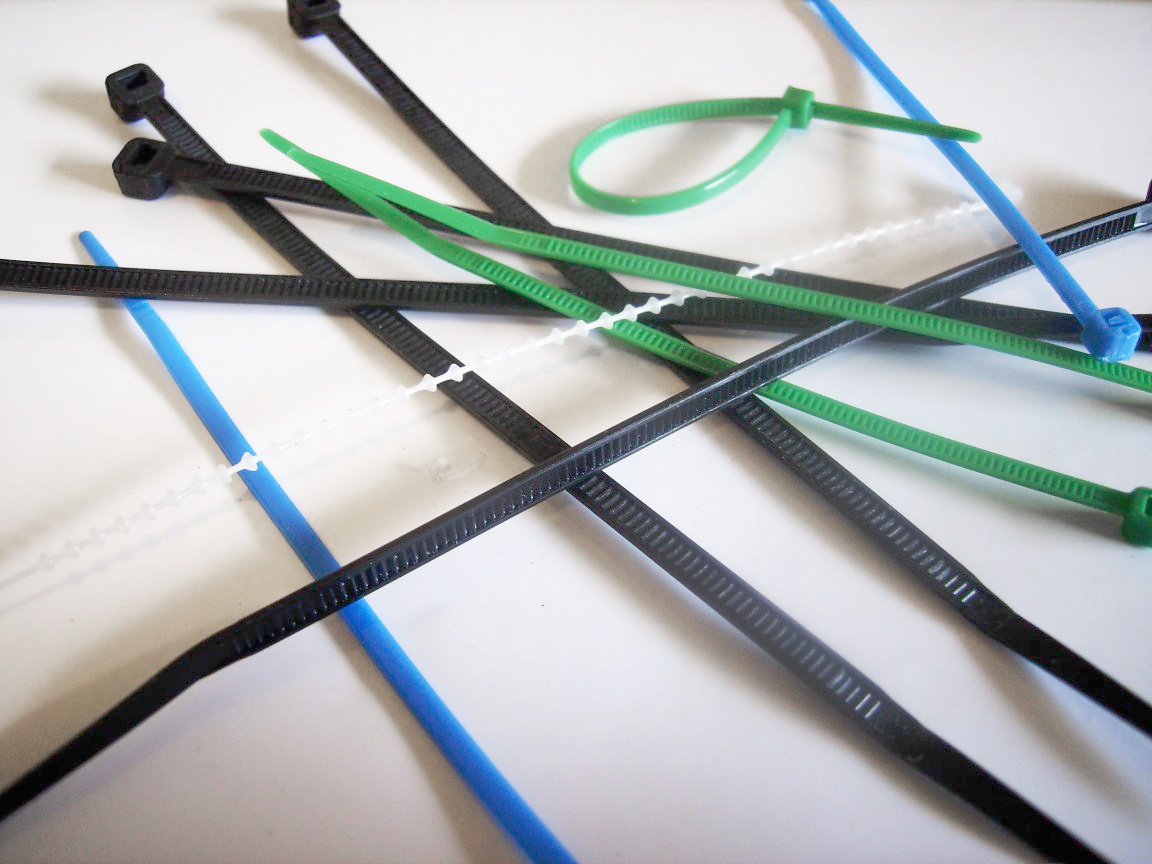
Assortment of cable ties

A cable tie (also known as a hose tie, panduit, tie wrap, wire tie, Steggel tie or zip tie) is a type of fastener for holding items together, primarily electrical cables and wires. Because of their low cost, ease of use, and binding strength, cable ties are ubiquitous, finding use in a wide range of other applications. Cable ties were first manufactured by Thomas & Betts in 1958 under the brand name Ty-Rap.

The common cable tie, normally made of nylon, has a flexible tape section with teeth that engage with a pawl in the head to form a ratchet, so that as the free end of the tape section is pulled the cable tie tightens and does not come undone. When the mouthpiece is inserted through the grooves and pulled tight, it creates a secure, adjustable loop, which locks in place like a knot. Some ties include a tab that can be depressed to release the ratchet so that the tie can be loosened or removed, and possibly reused. Stainless steel versions, some coated with rugged plastic, have been developed for exterior applications and hazardous environments.

== Design and use ==
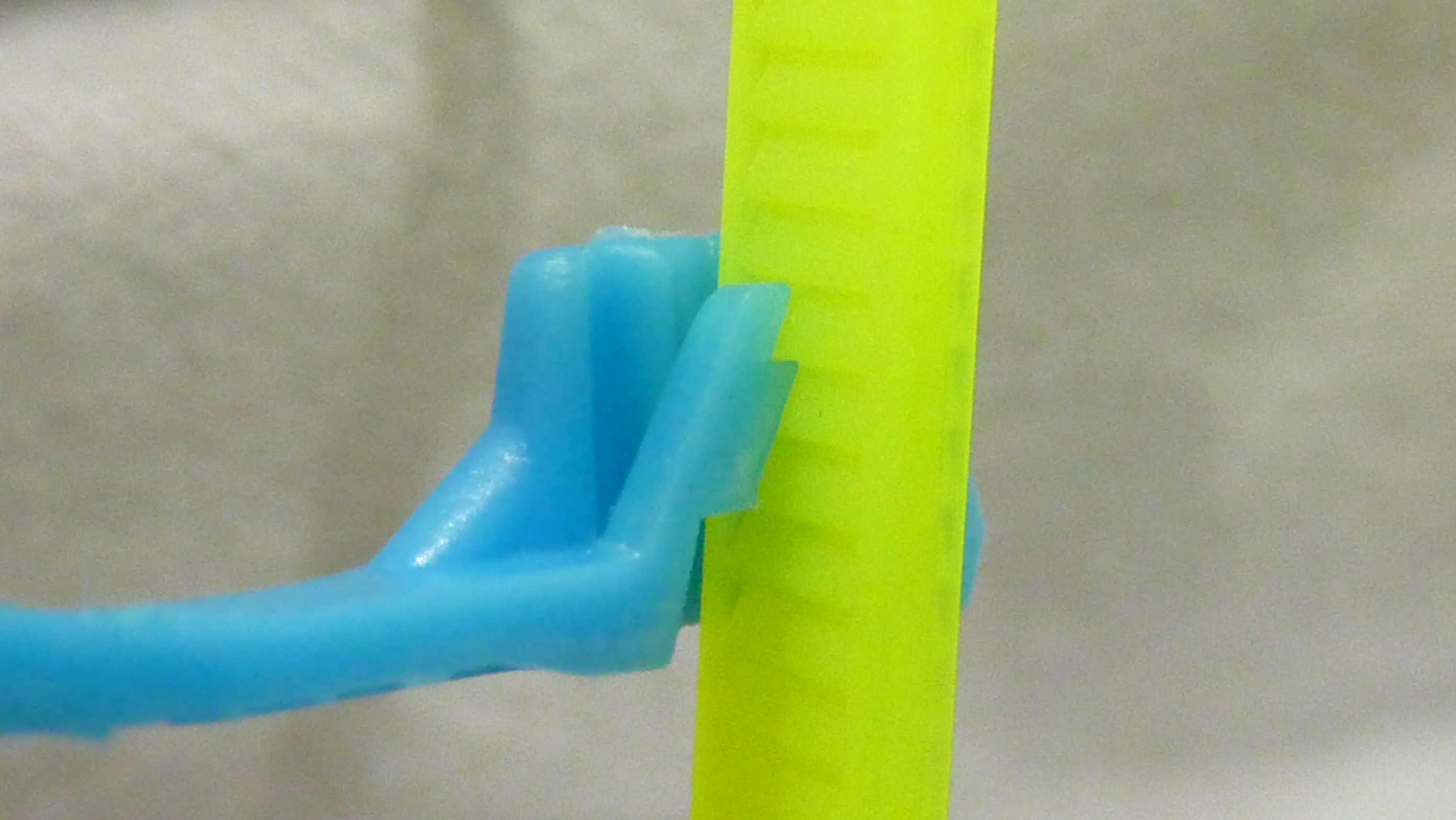
The ratchet mechanism on the head of a cable tie

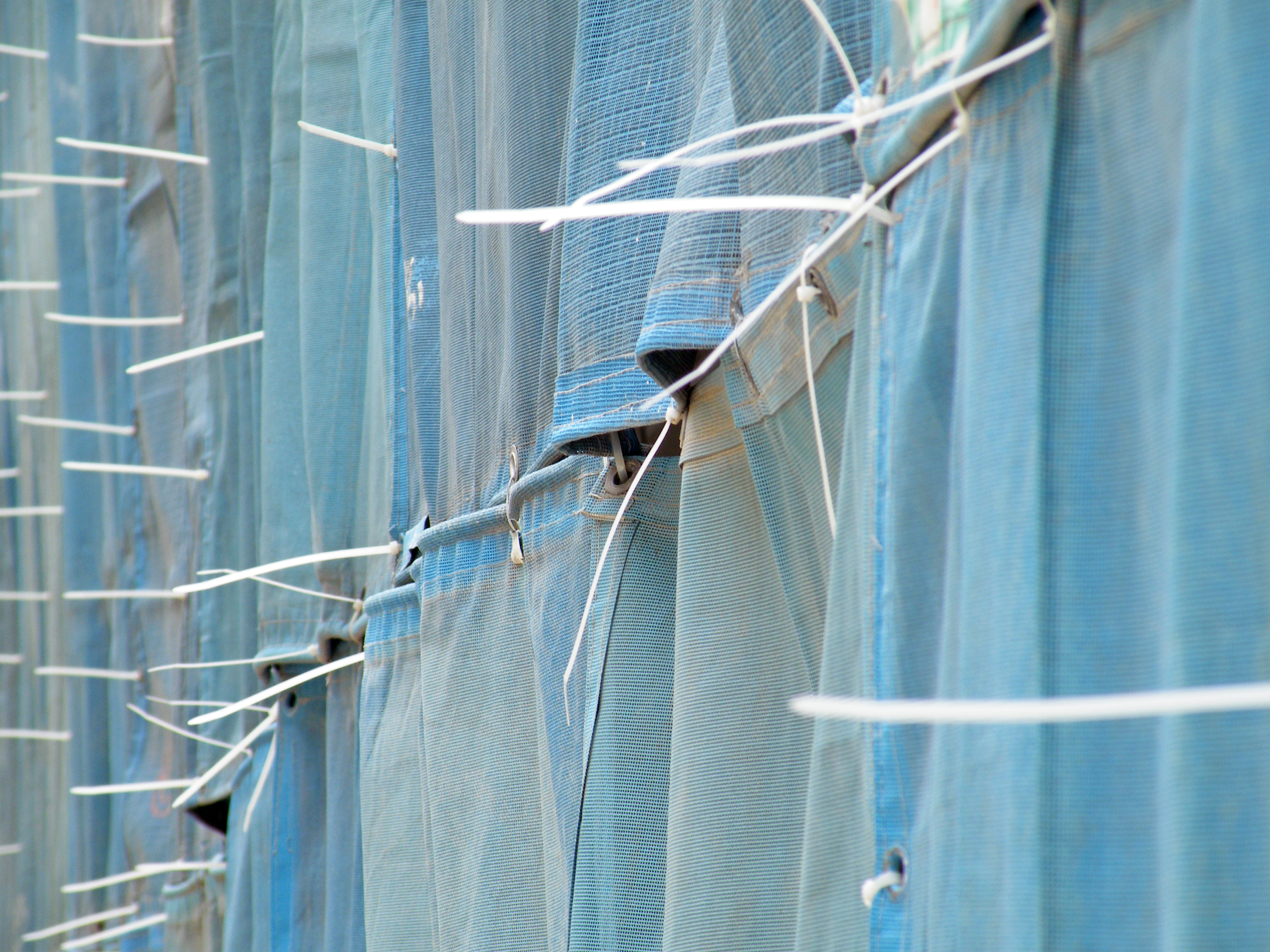
Cable ties used to attach shade cloth to scaffolding at a construction site in Singapore

The most common cable tie comprises a flexible nylon tape with an integrated linear ratchet gear rack, and on one end a pawl within a small open case. Once the pointed tip of the cable tie has been pulled through the case and past the ratchet, it is prevented from being pulled back unless a large amount of force is applied; the resulting loop may only be pulled tighter. This allows several cables to be bound into a cable bundle and/or to form a cable tree.

A cable tie tensioning device or tool may apply a cable tie with a specific tension. The tool may cut off the extra tail flush with the head in order to avoid a sharp edge which might otherwise cause injury. Light-duty tools are operated by squeezing the handle with the fingers, while heavy-duty versions can be powered by compressed air or a solenoid to prevent repetitive strain injury.

To increase resistance to ultraviolet light in outdoor applications, nylon containing a minimum of 2% carbon black is used to protect the polymer chains and extend the cable tie's service life. Blue cable ties are supplied to the food industry and contain a metal additive so they can be detected by industrial metal detectors. Cable ties made of ETFE (Tefzel) are used in radiation-rich environments. Red cable ties made of ECTFE (Halar) are used for plenum cabling.

Stainless steel cable ties are also available for flameproof applications—coated stainless ties are available to prevent galvanic attack from dissimilar metals (e.g. zinc-coated cable tray).

Plastic handcuffs are based on the cable tie design and are used by law enforcement to restrain prisoners. Cable ties are also sometimes used to prevent hubcaps (also known as wheel trims) from falling off a moving vehicle, and some are sold specifically for this purpose. The use of cable ties in medicolegal cases is infrequent, being involved in situations of neck compression or restraint.

== History ==
Cable ties were invented by Jason Bowser in 1958 under the brand name Ty-Rap. Initially, they were designed for airplane wire harnesses. The original design used a metal tooth, and these can still be obtained. Manufacturers later changed to the nylon/plastic design.

Over the years the design has been extended and developed into many spin-off products. One example was a self-locking loop developed as an alternative to purse-string suture in colon anastomosis.

The Ty-Rap cable tie's inventor, Maurus C. Logan, worked for Thomas & Betts and finished his career with the company as Vice President of Research and Development. During his tenure at Thomas & Betts, he contributed to the development and marketing of many successful Thomas & Betts products. Logan died on 12 November 2007, at age 86.

The idea for the cable tie came to Logan while touring a Boeing aircraft manufacturing facility in 1956. Aircraft wiring was a cumbersome and detailed undertaking, involving thousands of feet of wire organized on sheets of 50-foot-long plywood and held in place with knotted, wax-coated, braided nylon cord. Each knot had to be pulled tight by wrapping the cord around one's finger, which sometimes cut the operator's fingers until they developed thick calluses. Logan was convinced there had to be an easier, more forgiving way to accomplish this critical task.

For the next couple of years, Logan experimented with various tools and materials. On June 24, 1958, a patent for the Ty-Rap cable tie was submitted.

== Reusable & recyclable cable ties ==
Cable ties are generally designed as single-use devices; however, they can be reopened with little or no damage by inserting a small flat object between the ratchet and the pawl, and pulling the pawl out. Some models have a mechanism to release the pawl and allow re-use. Alternatively, the tie can be twisted 180 degrees and inserted into the case upside down to create a weaker loop that can be easily opened by hand, but still strong enough for certain simple tasks, such as holding several cables together.

In later years, some manufacturers have developed cable ties from materials other than traditional plastics, with such cable ties instead being made from recyclable materials such as long wood fibres.

== Alternatives ==
Other methods of bundling cable together securely and semi-permanently include cable lacing, strapping, binding knots such as the surgeon's knot or constrictor knot, Velcro brand hook-and-loop strips, conveyor belt hooks, twist ties, Rapstrap fasteners, or metal buckle.

== See also ==
- Cable dressing
