= Flexible cable =

Standard cables used in cable carriers may risk 'corkscrewing'

Flexible cables, or 'continuous-flex' cables, are electrical cables specially designed to cope with the tight bending radii and physical stress associated with moving applications, such as inside cable carriers.

Due to increasing demands within the field of automation technology in the 1980s, such as increasing loads, moving cables guided inside cable carriers often failed, although the cable carriers themselves did not. In extreme cases, failures caused by "corkscrews" and core ruptures brought entire production lines to a standstill, at high cost. As a result, specialized, highly flexible cables were developed with unique characteristics to differentiate them from standard designs. These are sometimes called “chain-suitable,” “high-flex,” or “continuous flex” cables.

A higher level of flexibility means the service life of a cable inside a cable carrier can be greatly extended. A normal cable typically manages 50,000 cycles, but a dynamic cable can complete between one and three million cycles.

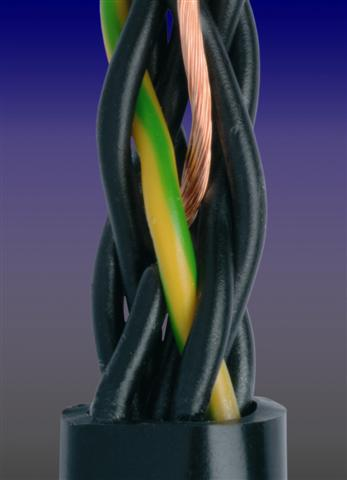
Here the cable conductors are braided

== Construction ==
Flexible cables can be divided into two types: those with conductors stranded in layers inside the cable, and those that have bundled or braided conductors.

=== Stranding in layers ===
Stranding in layers is easier to produce, and therefore usually less expensive, than a braided construction. The cable cores are stranded firmly and left relatively long in several layers around the center and are then enclosed in an extruded jacket. In the case of shielded cables, the cores are wrapped with braid or foils.

With this type of construction, when the cable is bending, the inner radius compresses and the outer radius stretches as the cable core moves. Initially, this works quite well, because the elasticity of the material is still sufficient, but material fatigue can set in and cause permanent deformations. The cores move and begin to make their own compressing and stretching zones, which can lead to a “corkscrew” shape, and ultimately, core rupture.

=== Stranding in bundles ===
Another cable construction technique is the braiding of conductors around a centre tension-resisting core. Eliminating multiple layers makes the bend radius of all conductors similar. Where the cable flexes, the path of any core moves quickly from the inside to the outside of the cable. The result is that no single core compresses near the inside of the bend or stretches near the outside of the bend—which reduces overall stresses. An outer jacket is still required to prevent the cores untwisting. A pressure filled jacket, rather than a simple extruded jacket, is preferable here. This fills all the gussets around the cores and ensures that the cores cannot untwist. The resulting dynamic cable is often stiffer than a standard cable, but lasts longer in applications where it must constantly flex.
