= Cable harness =

Bundle of electrical cables or wires

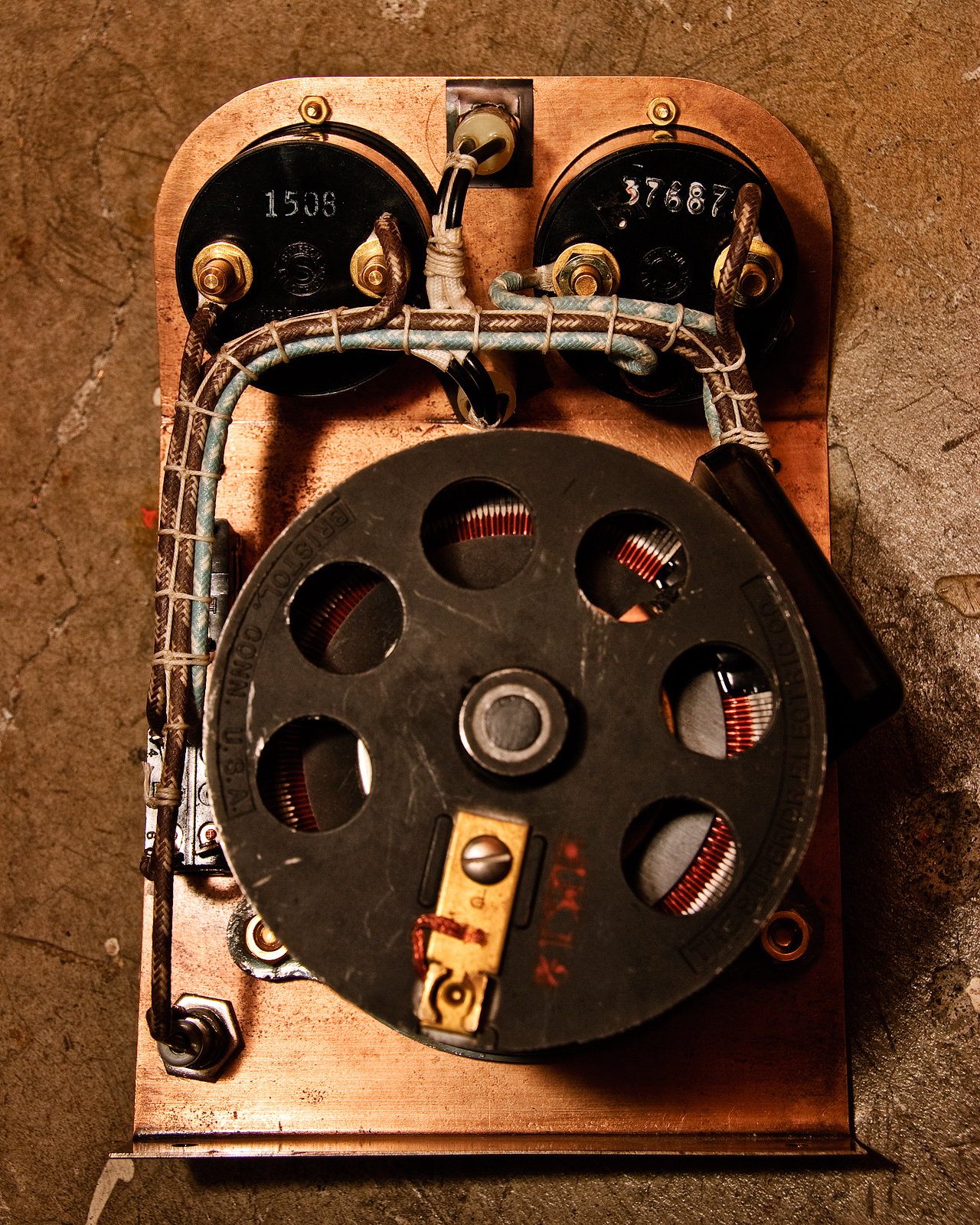
A cable laced wiring harness installed in a component of a Tesla coil

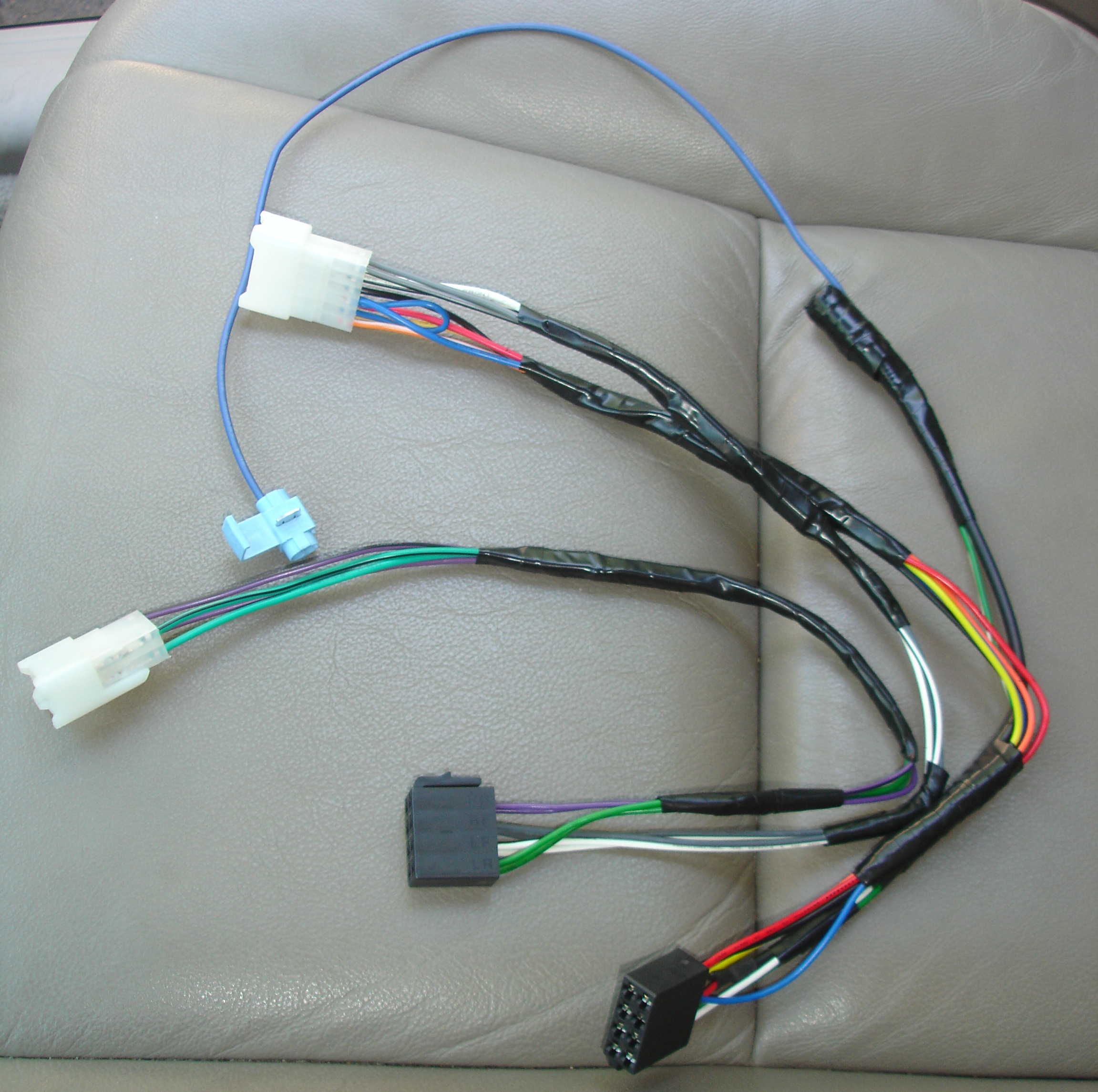
Harness of car audio cables.

A cable harness, also known as a wire harness, wiring harness, cable assembly, wiring assembly or wiring loom, is an assembly of electrical cables or wires which transmit signals or electrical power. The cables are bound together by a durable material such as rubber, vinyl, electrical tape, conduit, a weave of extruded string, or a combination thereof.

Commonly used in automobiles, as well as construction machinery, cable harnesses provide several advantages over loose wires and cables. For example, many aircraft, automobiles and spacecraft contain many masses of wires which would stretch over several kilometers if fully extended. By binding the many wires and cables into a cable harness, the wires and cables can be better secured against the adverse effects of vibrations, abrasions, and moisture. By constricting the wires into a non-flexing bundle, usage of space is optimized, and the risk of a short is decreased. Since the installer has only one harness to install (as opposed to multiple wires), installation time is decreased and the process can be easily standardized. Binding the wires into a flame retardant sleeve also lowers the risk of electrical fires.

== Design ==
The design of a wire harness usually requires the effort of two main engineering disciplines that focus on different functioning requirements, mechanical engineering and electrical engineering. Mechanical engineering focuses on the physical parameters of a wire harness and its interaction with the environment it will endure during its lifetime. This considers the operating conditions the wire harness is meant to operate under, i.e. temperature, mechanical stress, environmental and chemical wear. This component considers the protective materials wire harnesses have like corrugated tubes, braided or silica sleeves.

Electrical engineering focuses on developing the logical, electrical and topological architecture of the wire harnesses. During the design of electrical wires, one must consider the operating ratings of wires for communication protocols and design standards developed by entities like ASME, ISO or JASO.

== Productions ==
Cable harnesses are usually designed according to geometric and electrical requirements. A diagram is then provided (either on paper or on a monitor) for the assembly preparation and assembly.

The wires are first cut to the desired length, usually using a special wire-cutting machine. The wires may also be printed on by a special machine during the cutting process or on a separate machine. After this, the ends of the wires are stripped to expose the metal (or core) of the wires, which are fitted with any required terminals or connector housings. The cables are assembled and clamped together on a special workbench, or onto a pin board (assembly board), according to the design specification, to form the cable harness. After fitting any protective sleeves, conduit, or extruded yarn, the harness is either fitted directly in the vehicle or shipped.

In spite of increasing automation, hand manufacture continues to be the primary method of cable harness production in general, due to the many different processes involved, such as:

- Routing wires through sleeves
- Taping with fabric tape, in particular on branch outs from wire strands
- Crimping terminals onto wires, particularly for so-called multiple crimps (more than one wire into one terminal)
- Inserting one sleeve into another
- Fastening strands with tape, clamps or cable ties

It is difficult to automate these processes, with major suppliers still using manual means of production, only automating portions of the process. Manual production remains more cost effective than automation, especially with small batch sizes.

Pre-production can be automated in part. This affects:

- Cutting individual wires (cutting machine)
- Wire stripping (automated wire stripping machines)
- Crimping terminals onto one or both sides of the wire
- Partial plugging of wires prefitted with terminals into connector housings (module)
- Soldering of wire ends (solder machine)
- Twisting wires

A wire harness must also be manufactured with a terminal, defined as "a device designed to terminate a conductor that is to be affixed to a post, stud, chassis, another tongue, etc., to establish an electrical connection." Some types of terminals include ring, tongue, spade, flag, hook, blade, quick-connect, offset and flagged.

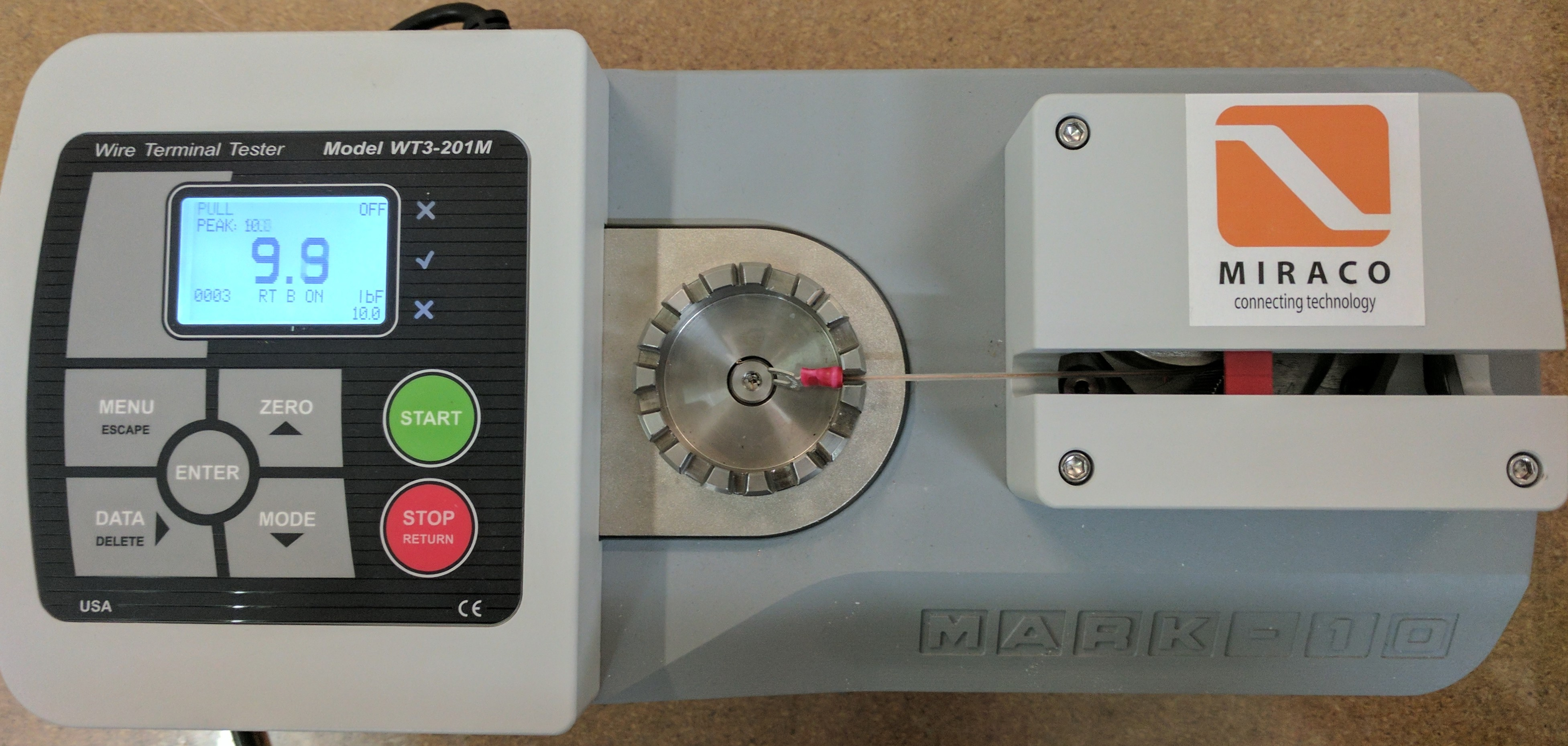
Pull test qualification of crimped end.

Once a cable harness has been produced, it is often subject to various tests to ensure its quality and functionality. A test board can be used to measure the harness' electrical capabilities. This is achieved through the input of data about a circuit which one or more cable harnesses will be part of being programmed into the test board. The harness is then measured for its ability to function in the simulated circuit.

Another popular test method for a cable harness is a 'pull test', in which the harness is attached to a machine that pulls the harness at a constant rate. This test then measures the cable harness' strength and electrical conductivity when pulled against a minimum standard to ensure that cable harnesses are consistently effective and safe.

== In sound engineering ==
The cable harnesses used in sound reinforcement and recording studios are called multicores, also known as snakes or looms. They carry audio signals between a mixing console and stage box. Modern digital mixing consoles typically use a single twisted pair cable rather than a traditional analog multicore.

== Industry quality standard ==
Although customer specifications take the highest priority when creating cable harnesses of a certain quality, in North America if no such specifications are found the quality standards of a cable harness are standardized by the IPC's publication IPC/WHMA-A-620E for minimal requirements for cable harnesses. This publication is reviewed frequently to ensure that the standards published remain of an acceptable standard in light of potential changes to the industry or technology that may occur. The IPC/WHMA-A-620E publication has standards for a wide range of elements within a cable harness, including but not limited to electrostatic discharge protection, conduit, installation and repairs, crimping, pull-test requirements, and other operations that are critical to the production and function of cable harnesses. The standards mandated by the IPC differ based on a product's classification under one of three defined product classes.

These classes are:

- Class 1: general electronic products, for objects where the functionality of the final product is the major requirement. This can include objects such as toys and other items that do not serve a critical purpose
- Class 2: dedicated service electronic products, where consistent and extended performance is needed, but uninterrupted service is not vital. The failure of this product would not result in significant failures or danger
- Class 3: high performance electronic products, for products that require continued and consistent performance and where periods of inoperativeness cannot be tolerated. The environment in which these cable harnesses are used may be "uncommonly harsh." This category encompasses devices involved in life support systems or that are used in military
