= Cable lacing =

Method for tying cables together

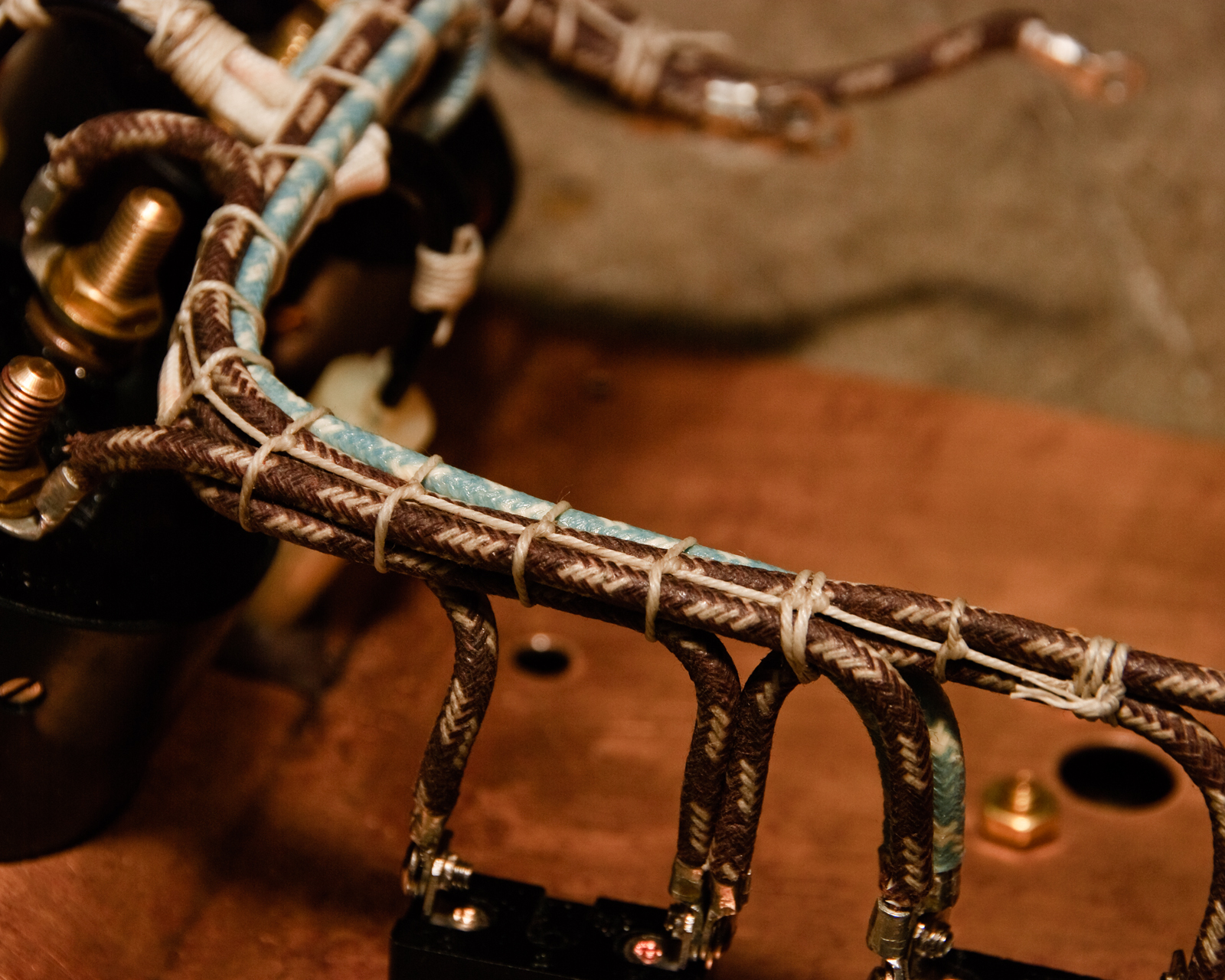
Laced wiring harness from a Tesla coil

Cable lacing is a method for tying wiring harnesses and cable looms, traditionally used in telecommunication, naval, and aerospace applications. This old cable management technique, taught to generations of lineworkers, is still used in some modern applications since it does not create obstructions along the length of the cable, avoiding the handling problems of cables groomed by plastic or hook-and-loop cable ties.

Cable lacing uses a thin cord, which is traditionally made of waxed linen, to bind together a group of cables using a series of running lockstitches. Flat lacing tapes made of modern materials such as nylon, polyester, Teflon, fiberglass, and Nomex are also available with a variety of coatings to improve knot holding.

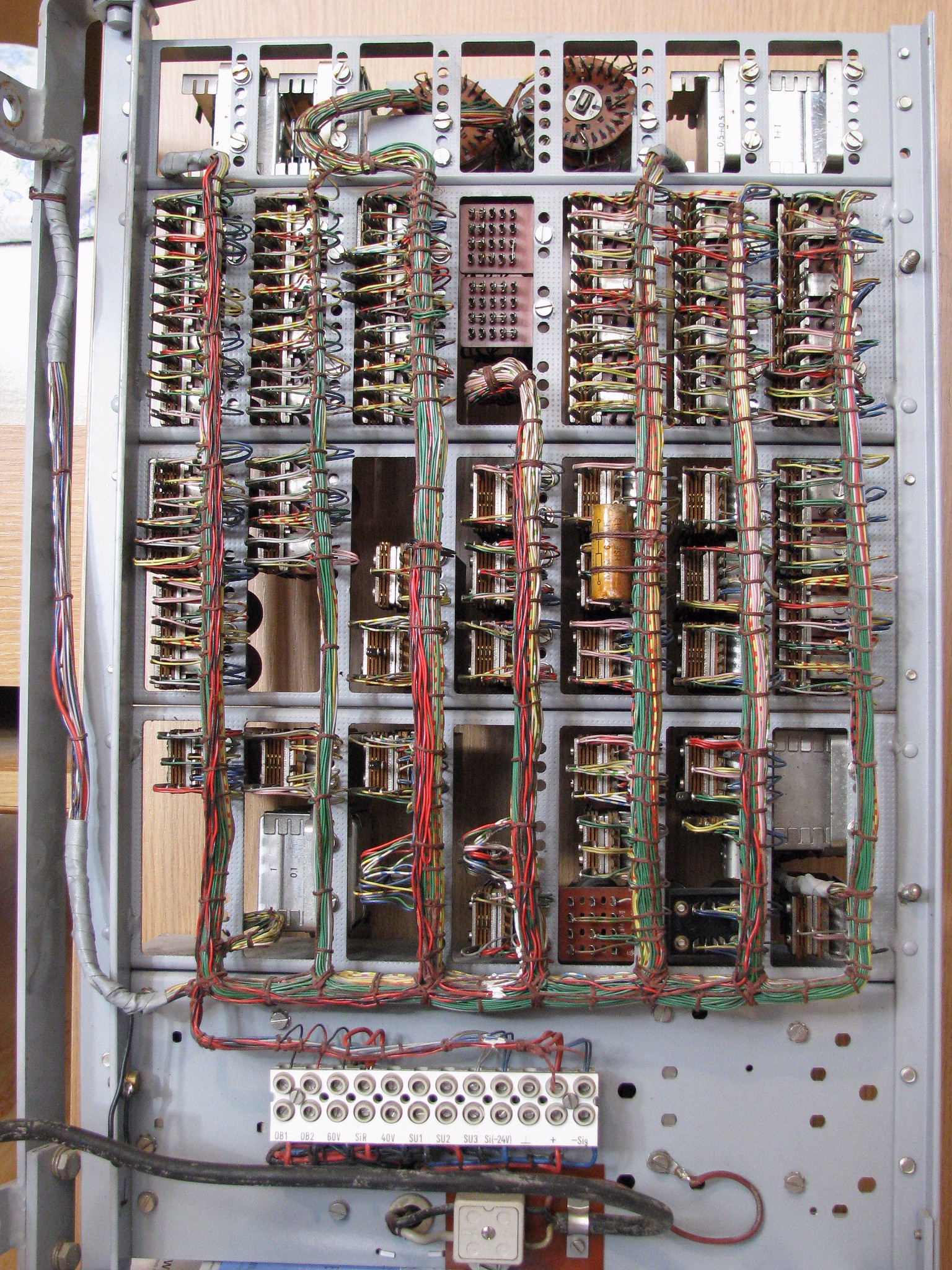
PABX with extensive cable lacing

== Styles ==
The lacing begins and ends with a whipping or other knot to secure the free ends. Wraps are spaced relative to the overall harness diameter to maintain the wiring in a tight, neat bundle, and the ends are then neatly trimmed. In addition to continuous or running lacing, there are a variety of lacing patterns used in different circumstances. In some cases stand-alone knots called spot ties are also used. For lashing large cables and cable bundles to support structures in telecommunications applications, there are three named cable lacing styles: the box stitch, the Chicago stitch, and the Kansas City stitch.

The Kansas City and Chicago stitches are adapted to multiple cables; each forms the cables into a rectangular structure by wrapping wax string around each pair within the bundle. They both require a cable sewing needle to tie, such as the Jonard 2257 or 3209, or an Evans needle like Jonard 287. The needle is used by pushing its blade through the bundle, inserting the wax string through its loop, and drawing it with the wax string back through the bundle.

The Chicago stitch can be used to bind cables in free space, or to bind them to a support; in the latter case, the stitch is started by tying around the support, and then the Chicago stitch is performed as though in free space. The Kansas City stitch lays the bundle flat against the support, and each internal wrapping in the bundle also wraps the support.

The box stitch is suited to one or few cables, and is suited to binding a large cable or a small number of cables to a support. It will make a cylindrical structure rather than a rectangle, but it is less time-consuming, and it does not require a tool.

Some organizations have in-house standards to which cable lacing must conform, for example NASA specifies its cable lacing techniques in chapter 9 of NASA-STD-8739.4.

== Examples ==
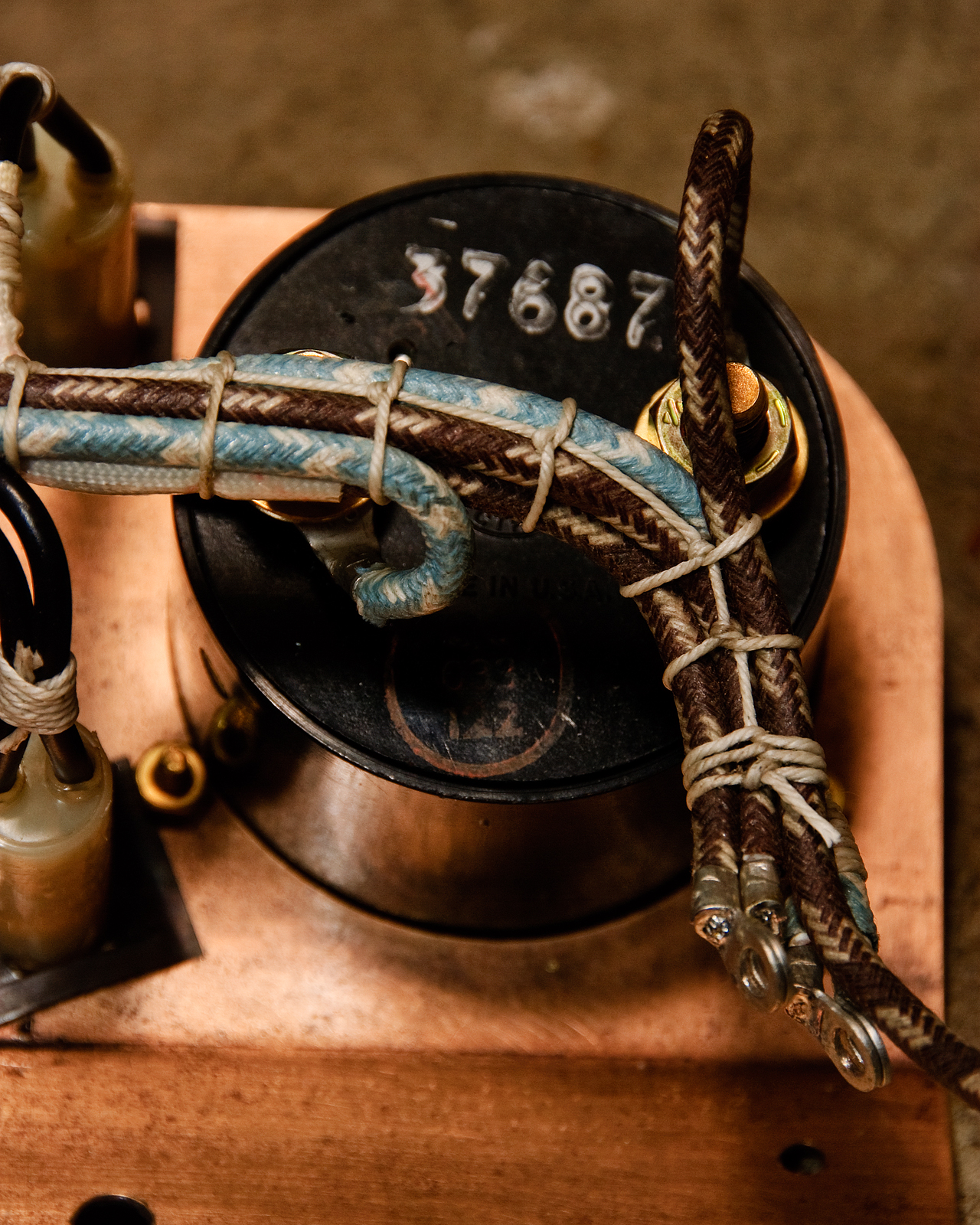
Traditional waxed cord lacing made with a series of running lockstitches based on the figure-eight knot

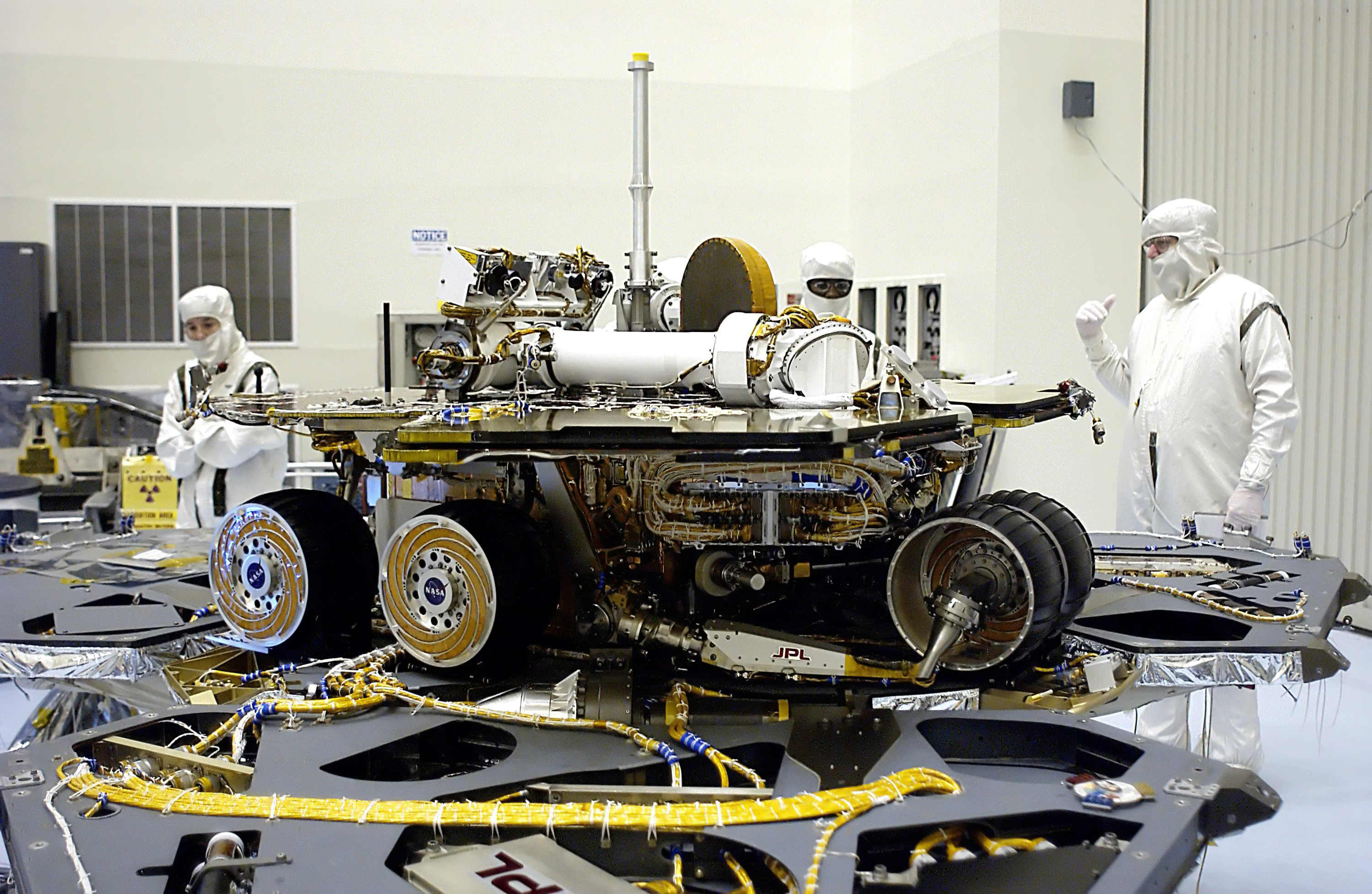
A variety of lacing techniques are visible on the cabling of the NASA Mars Exploration Rover Spirit and its lander.

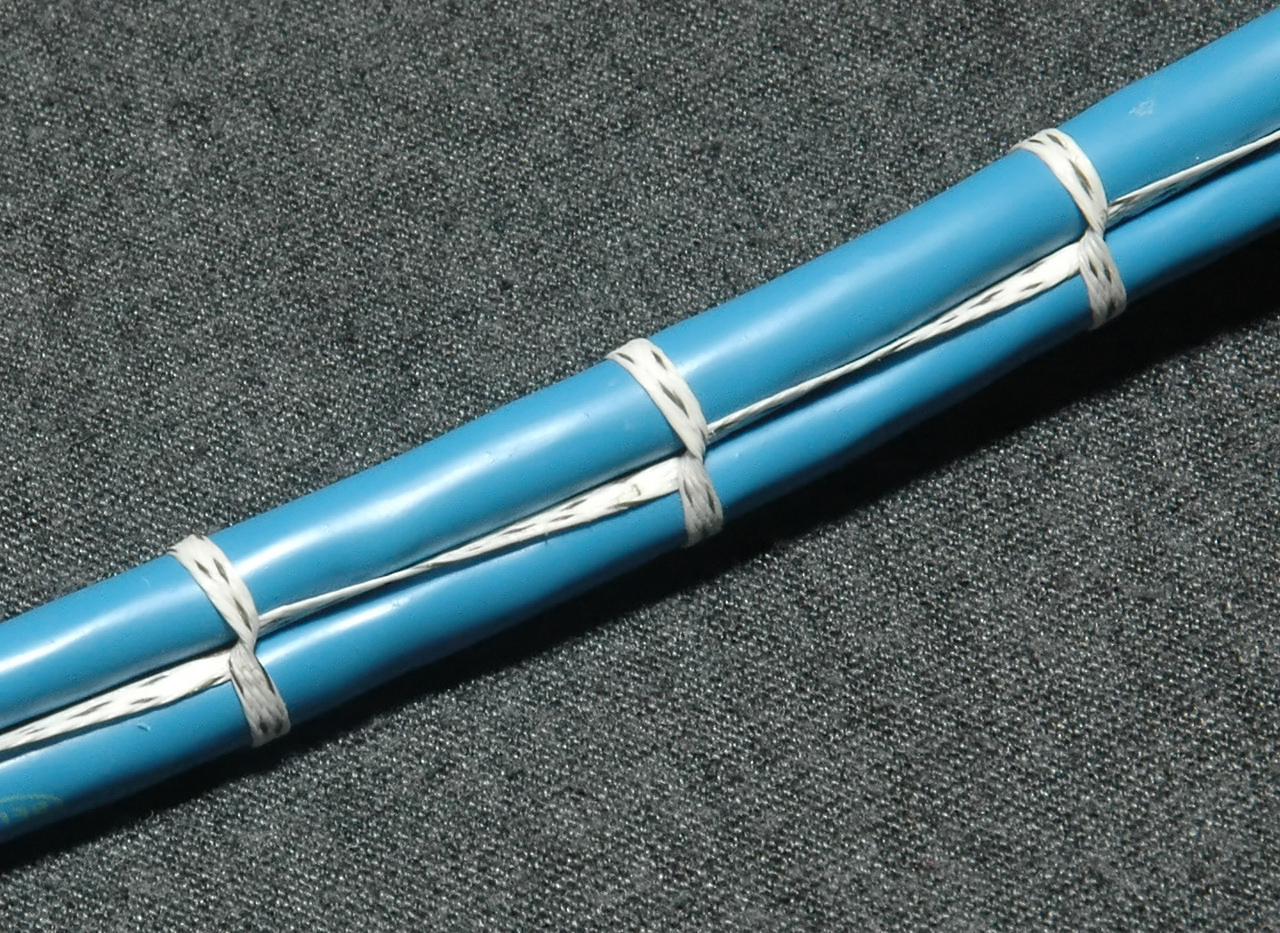
This style of continuous lacing, also called "marline hitching", is based on a series of overhand knots. A series of half-hitches, while visually similar, is not recommended for this application.

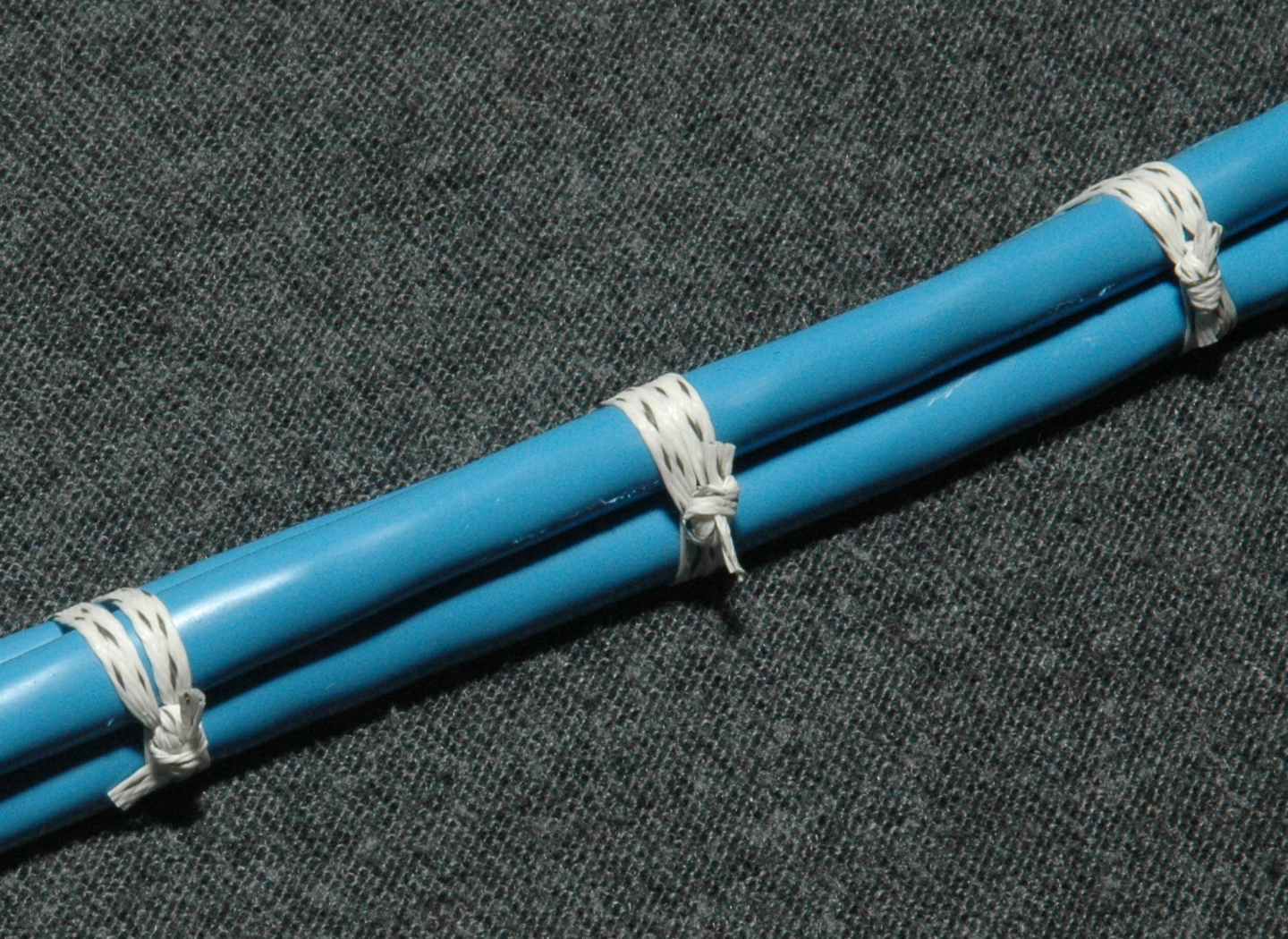
Spot ties formed with a clove hitch topped by a reef knot made in modern Nomex lacing tape. A surgeon's knot is an acceptable substitute for the reef knot.

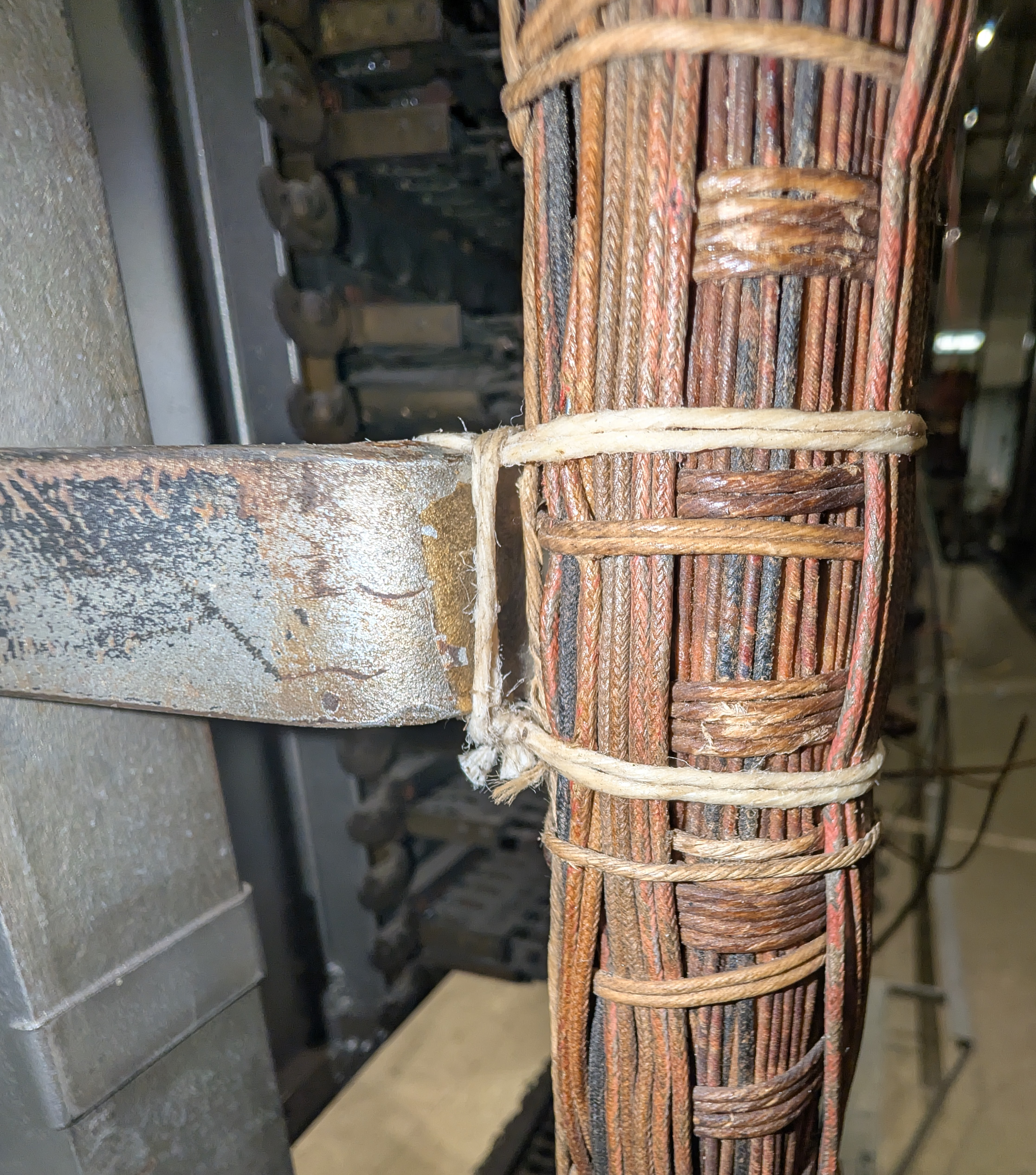
A box stitch used to secure a bundle of wires to a frame. The wires are bundled with a running stitch, and are secured to the frame with the box stitch.

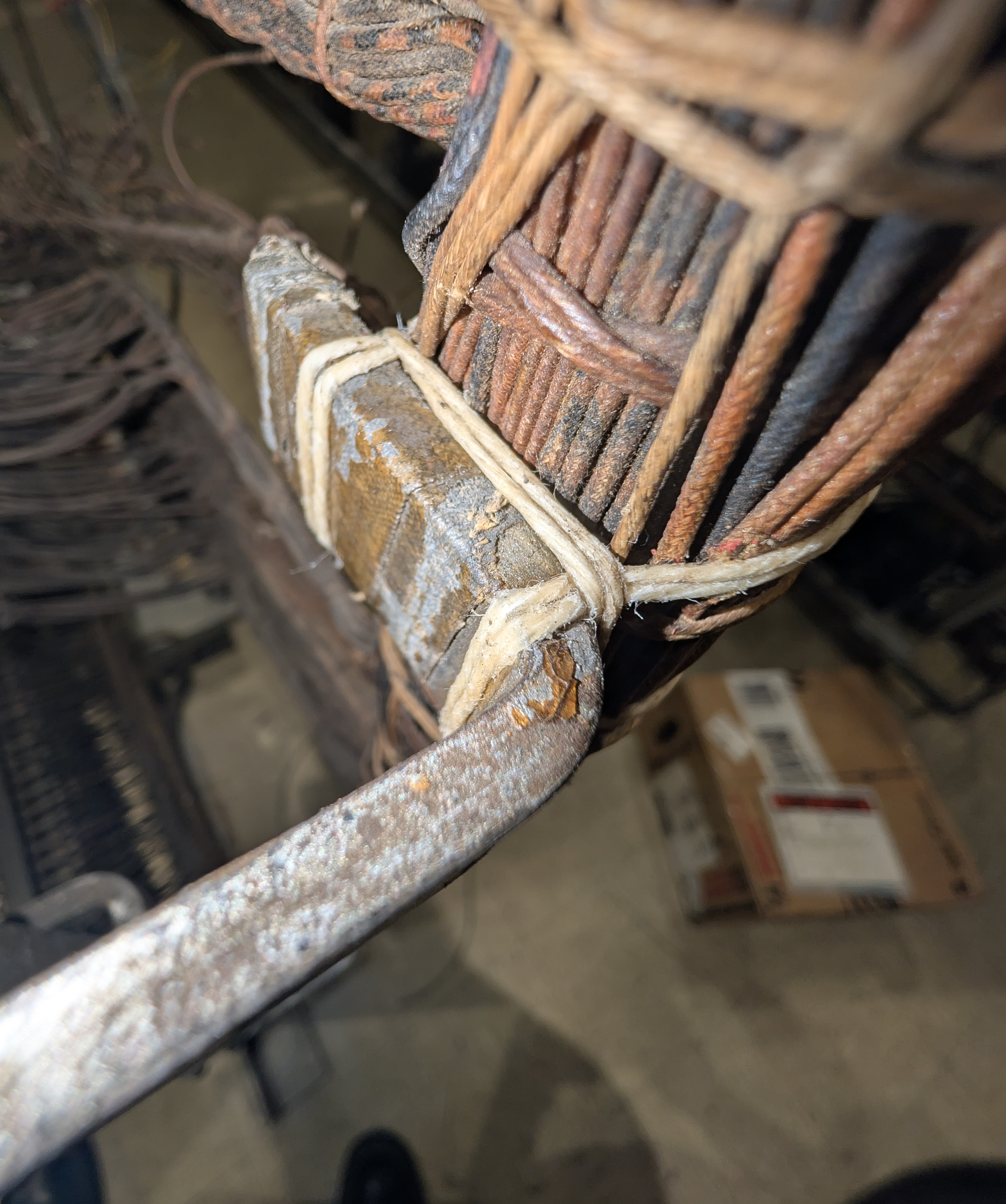
View of the box stitch showing how the cables are secured to the support.

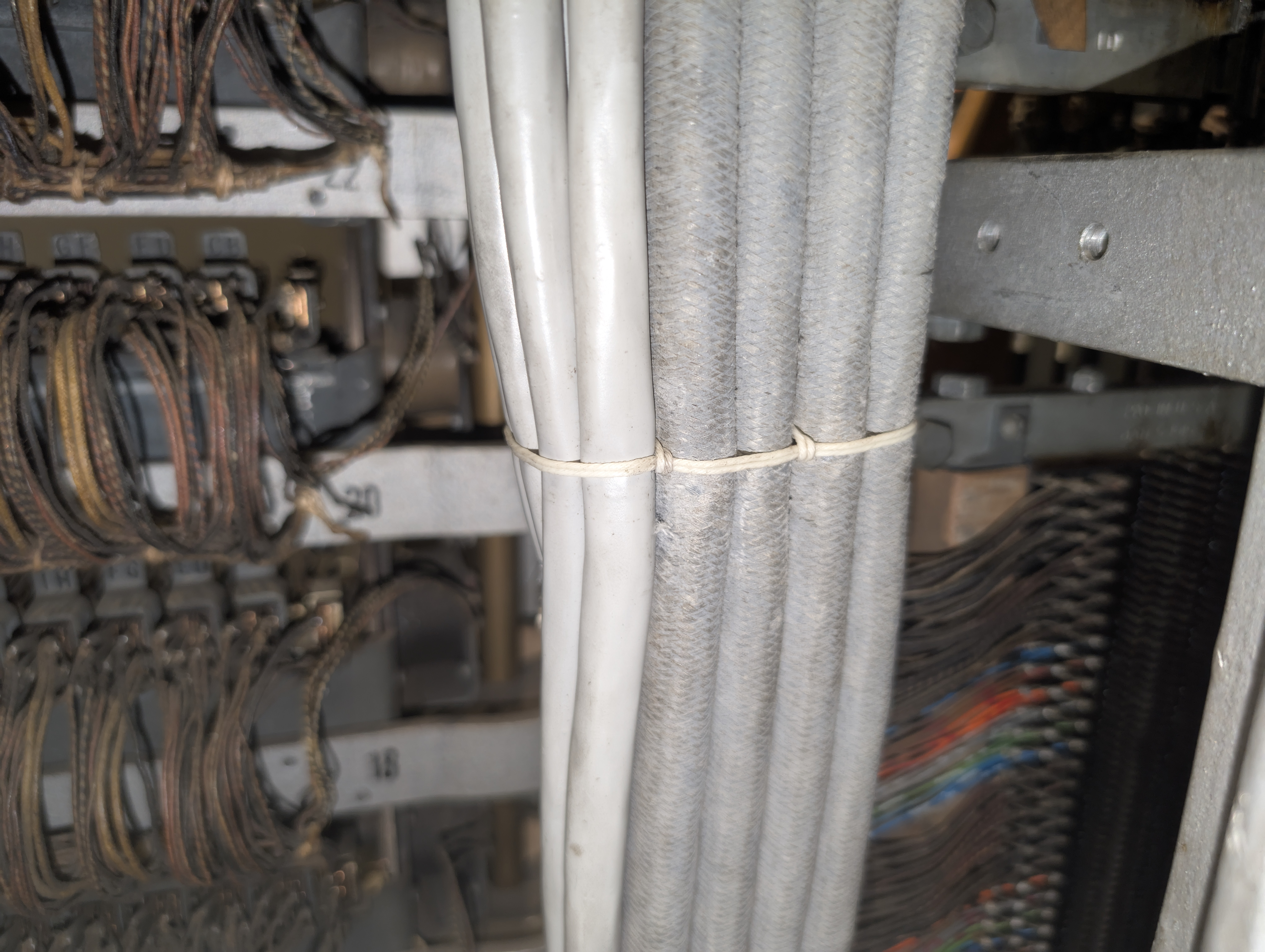
Cables laced together in a bundle using a Chicago stitch. In this case, the cables are not secured to a structure, but the cable lacing is used to keep them in a rectangular form in the riser.

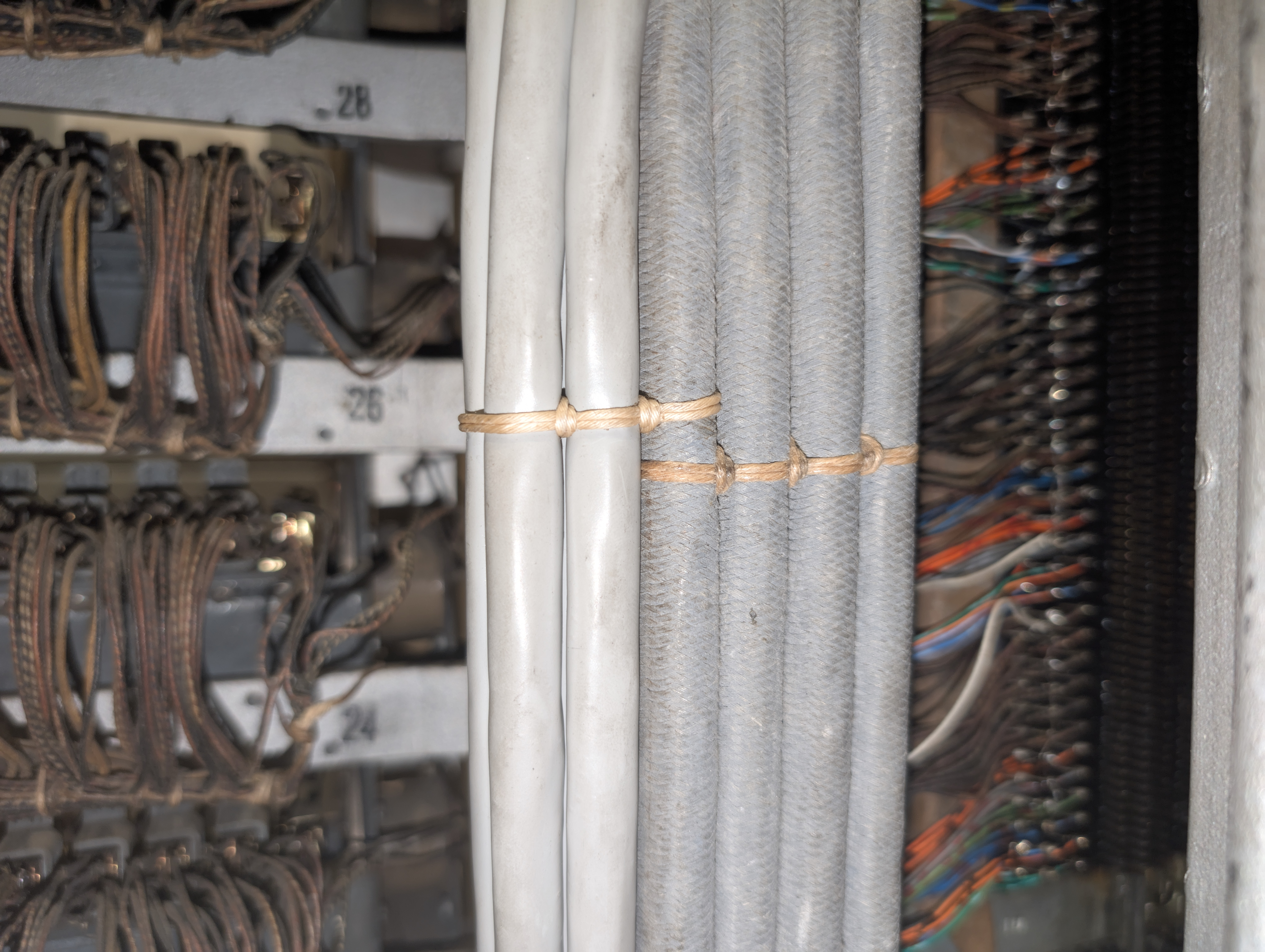
A Chicago stitch where some additional cables (grey plastic, left) have been added to an existing bundle (fabric cables, right).

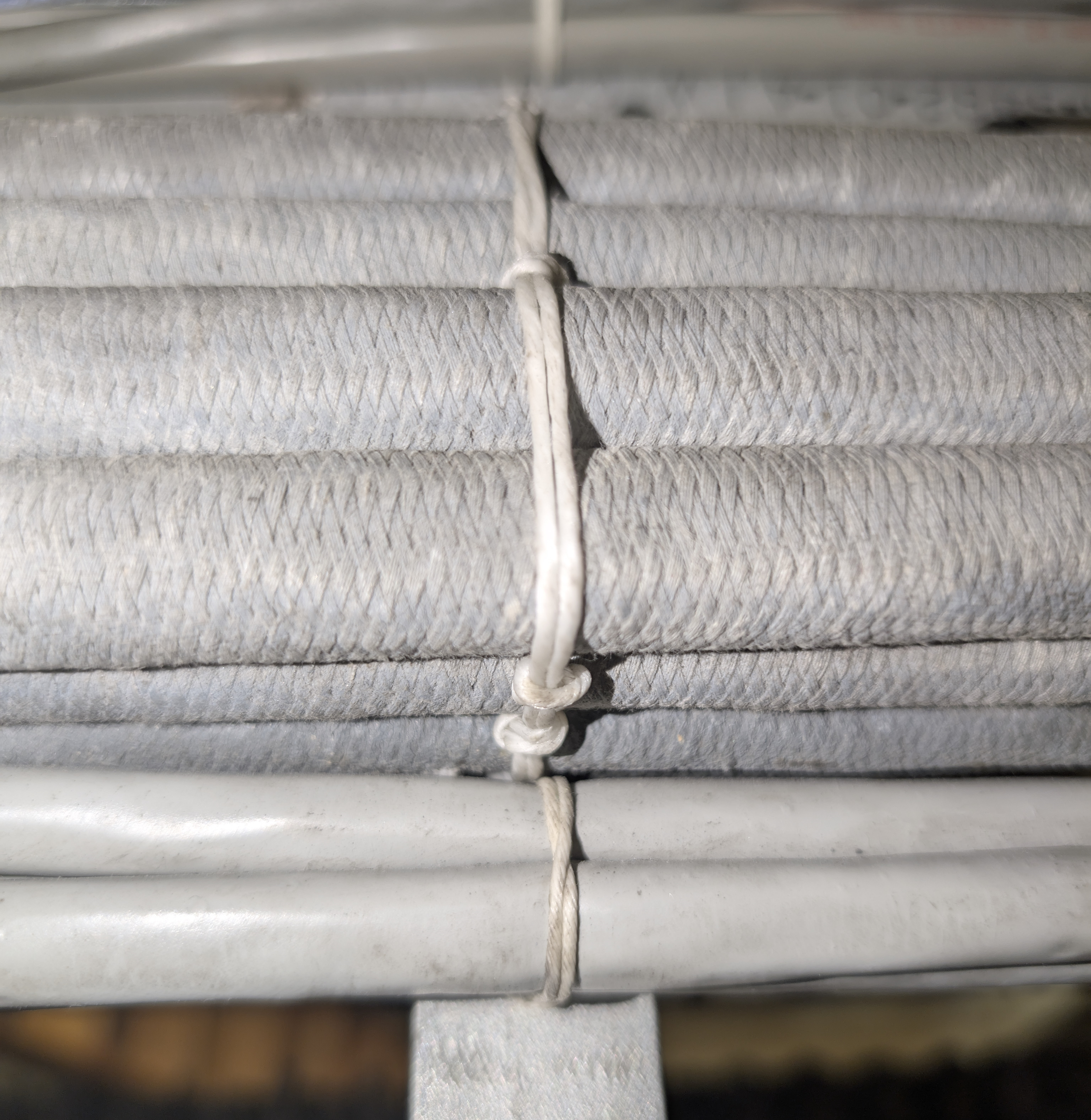
Cables laced together using a Kansas City stitch.

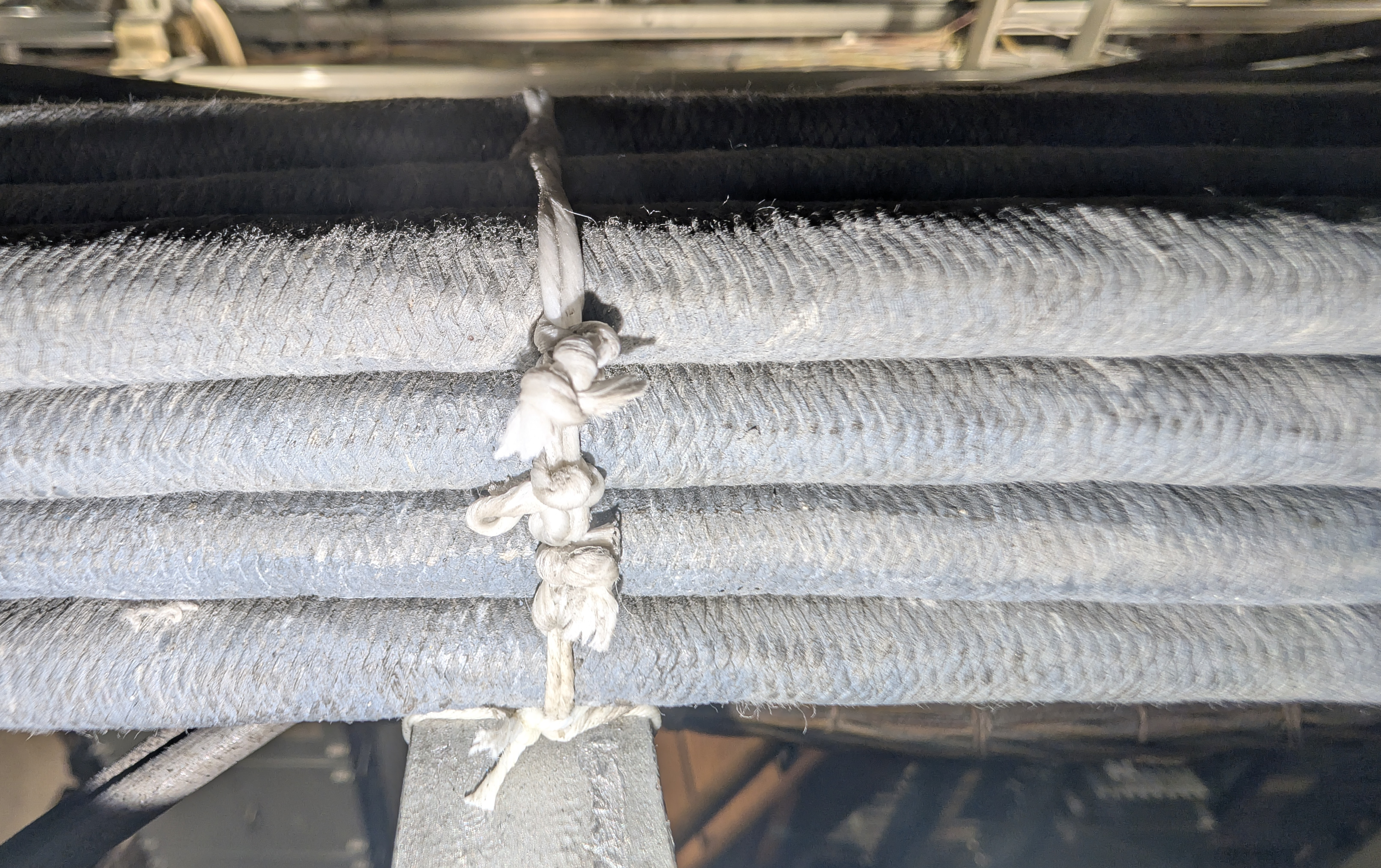
Side view of cables laced together and secured to a frame with a Kansas City stitch.

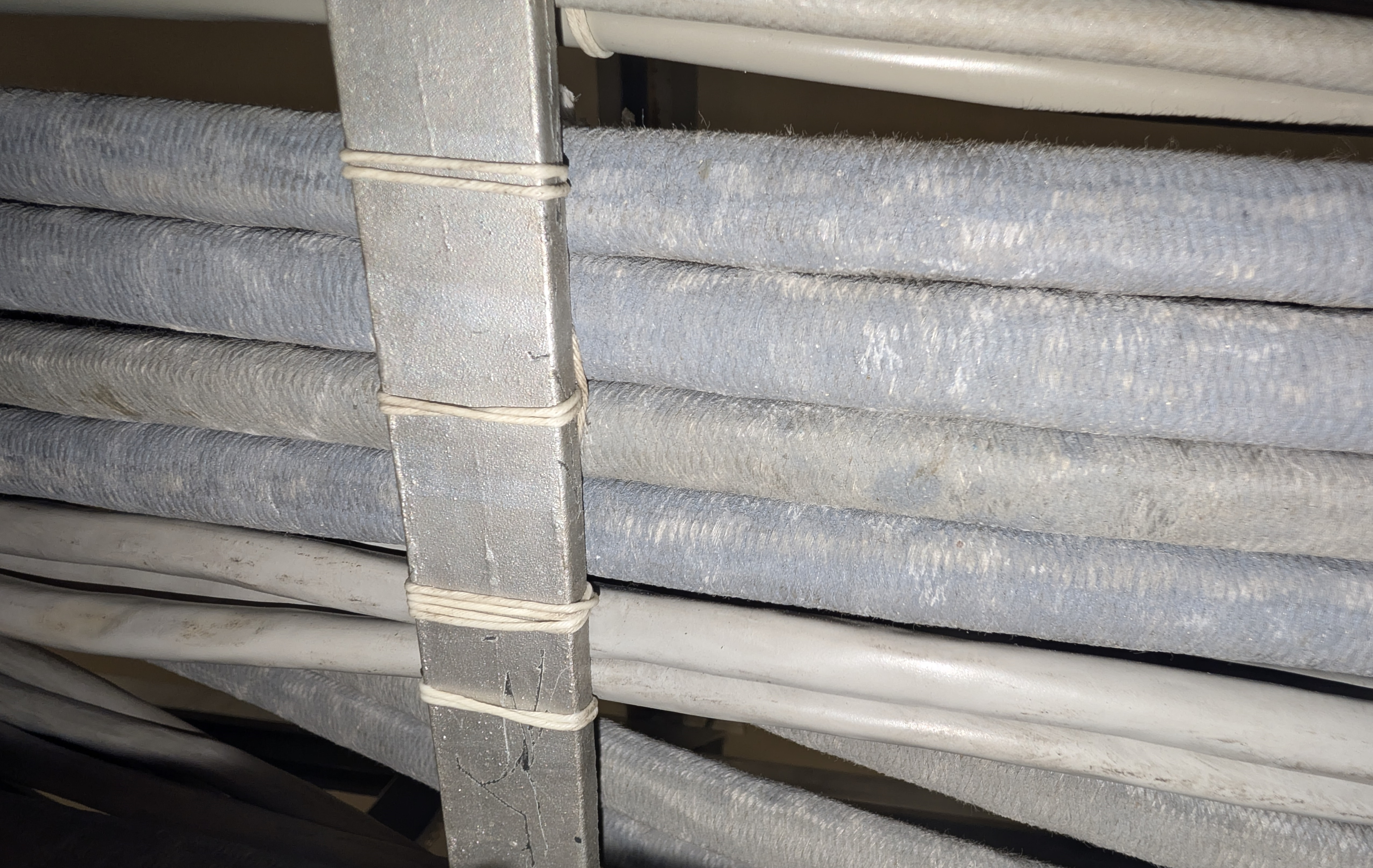
Back view of a bundle of cables secured to a frame with a Kansas City stitch. The bundle is stitched to the support in multiple places.

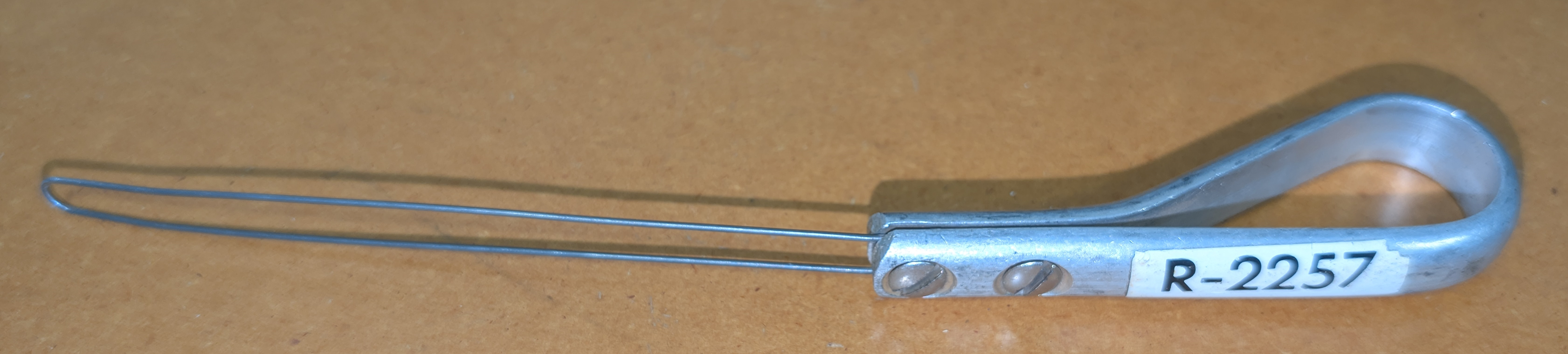
Jonard 2257 needle used to tie the Kansas City and Chicago stitches.
