= Cable carrier =

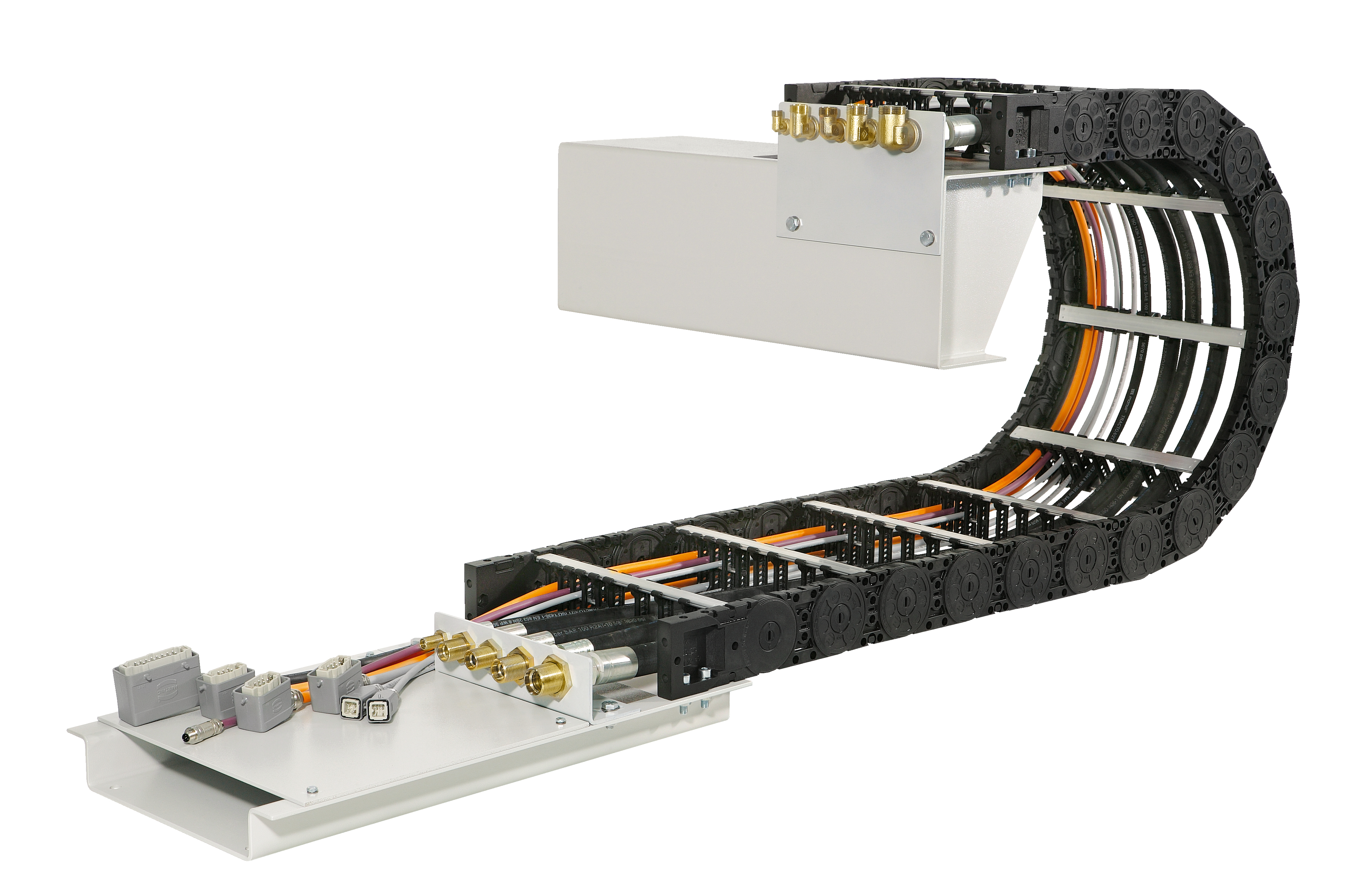
An example of a standard type chain with cables running through it

Cable carriers, also known as drag chains, energy chains, or cable chains depending on the manufacturer, are guides designed to surround and guide flexible electrical cables and hydraulic or pneumatic hoses connected to moving automated machinery. They reduce wear and stress on cables and hoses, prevent entanglement, and improve operator safety.

Cable carriers may be arranged to accommodate horizontal, vertical, rotary and three-dimensional movements.

== History ==
Steel carriers were introduced to the market for the first time in the 1950s. Their inventor Dr Gilbert Waninger and Dr Waldrich, the owner of the Kabelschlepp, recognized the great potential of these chains at an early stage.

Until then flexibles such as cables and hydraulic hoses had simply been allowed to hang loose from machines, resulting in damage and rapid wear. Nowadays, plastic (specifically, polypropylene or PP) cable carriers are also widely used.

== Structure ==
Most carriers have a rectangular cross section, inside which the cables lie. Cross bars along the length of the carrier can be opened from the outside, so that cables can be easily inserted and plugs connected. Internal separators in the carrier separate the cables. Cables can also be held in place with an integrated strain relief. Mounting brackets fix the ends of the carrier to the machine.

Besides only bending in one plane due to the rigid jointed structure, cable carriers also often only permit bending in one direction. In combination with rigid mounting of the ends of the carrier, this can entirely prevent the enclosed cables from flopping in undesired directions and becoming tangled or crushed.

== Variants ==
Today cable carriers are available in many different styles, sizes, prices and performance ranges. Some of the following variants are:

- open
- closed (protection from dirt and debris, such as woodchips or metal shavings)
- Steel or Stainless steel
- low noise
- cleanroom compliant (minimal wear)
- multi-axis movement
- high load resistant
- chemical, water and temperature resistant

== Cables ==
Cable carriers are often used with special highly flexible cables to extend the cables' service life.

== Application examples ==
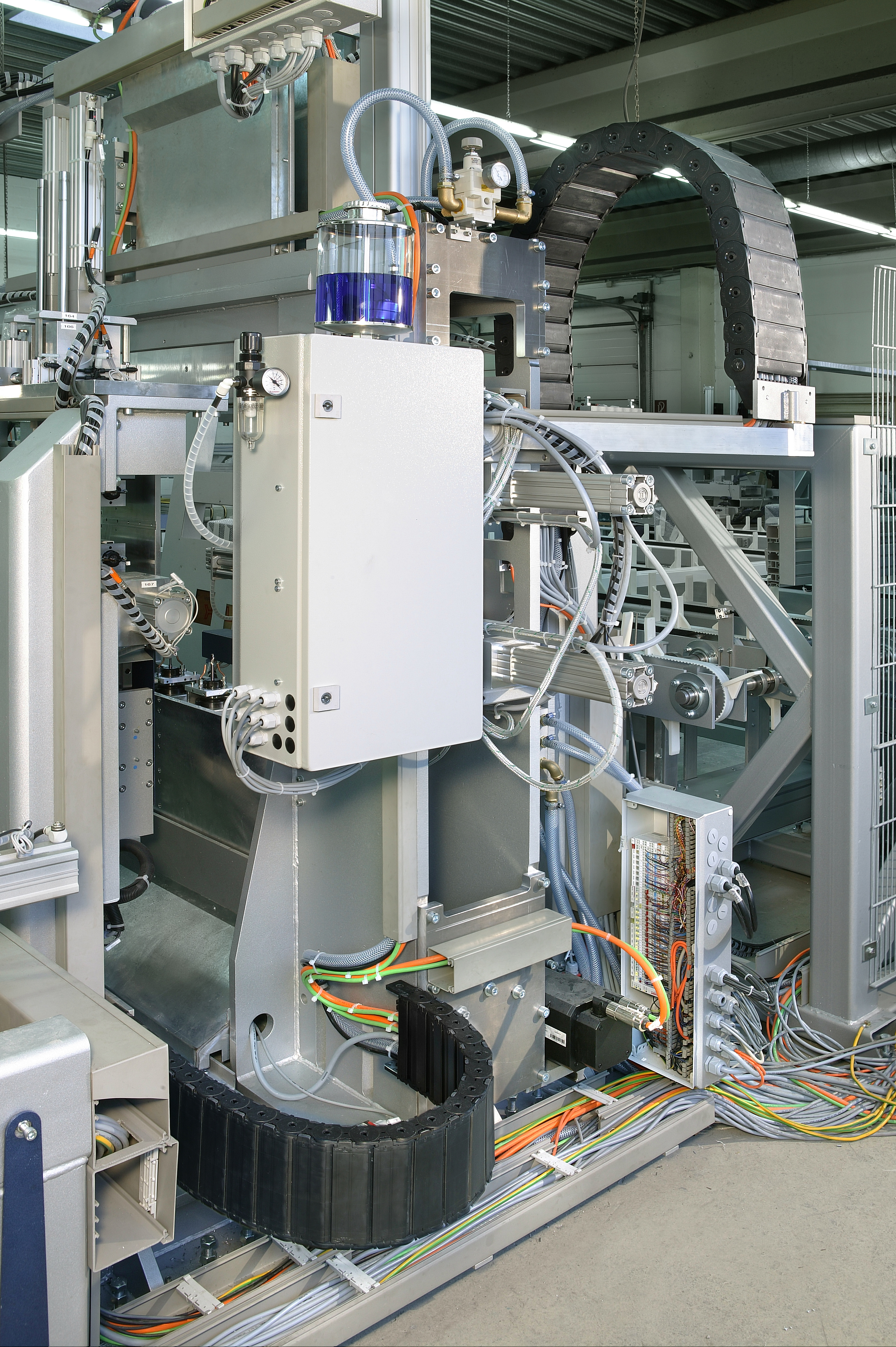
Example of cable carrier in use

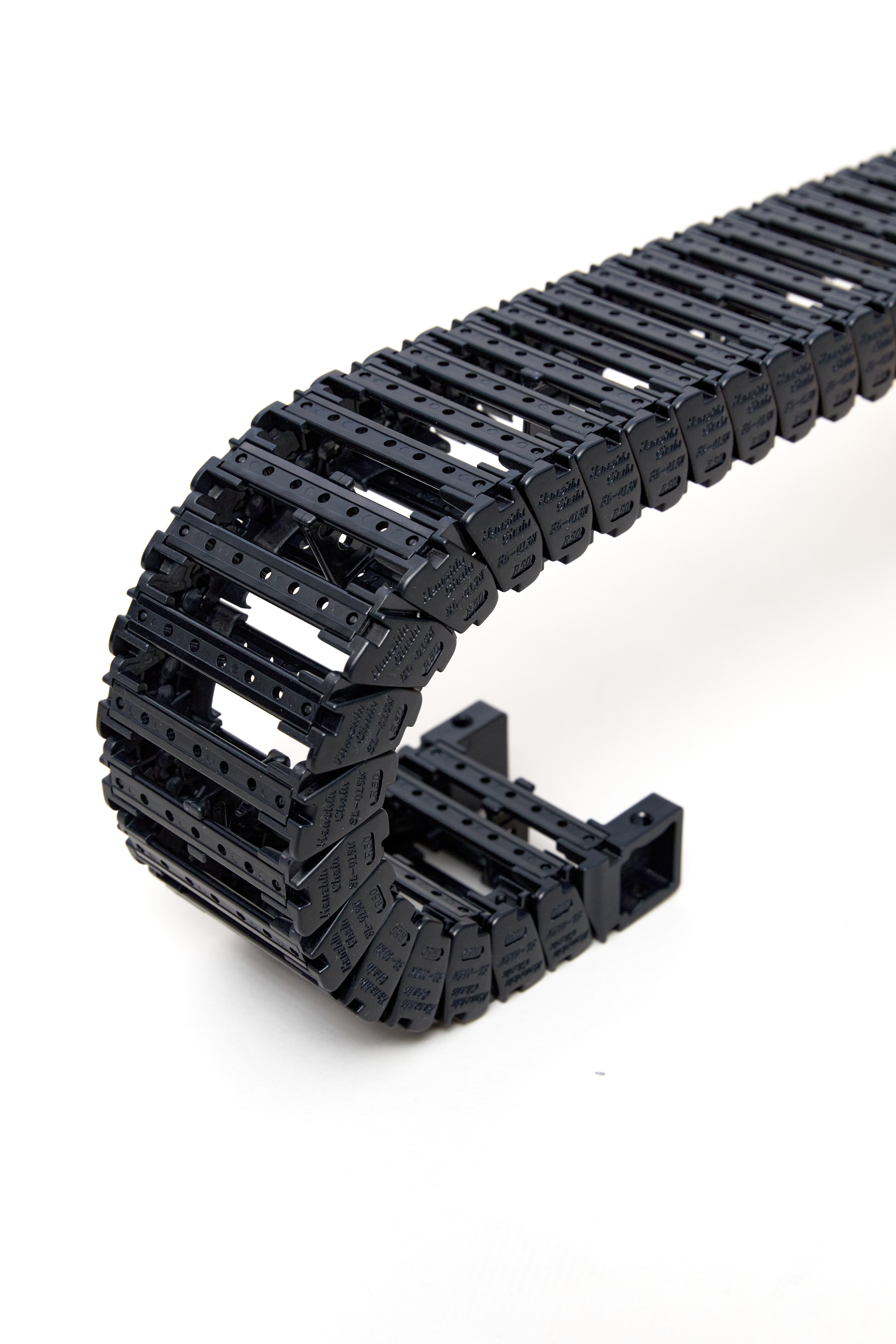
Example of cable carrier in use

Cable carriers are used anywhere where there is moving automation involving the transferral of energy, data, liquids or gases. Examples include machine tools, cranes, car washes, medical and laboratory equipment, automatic warehousing, forklifts, industrial robots, offshore oil rigs and stage technology.

== Heavy duty drag chains ==
While drag chains are used for several applications and made of different materials, heavy duty drag chains are often created using steel due to its durability. This type of drag chain is often utilised within the oil and gas industry for their offshore operations. A heavy duty drag chain is hardwearing due to the nature of the cabling and hoses that they protect.
