= Drop box =

Dropbox or drop box may refer to:

- Dropbox, a web-based file hosting service
- Drop box, or post box, a physical box for collection of outgoing mail
- Drop box (audio engineering), a device used to connect microphones to a multicore cable
- Drop box (stage lighting), a device used to connect multiple lights to one power source
- Drop box (weaving device), a device invented by Robert Kay for improved working of weaving looms
- The Drop Box, 2014 documentary film
- Dropbox (band), an American rock band
  - Dropbox (album), their 2004 album
