= Sharma speaker =

A Sharma D900 speaker

The Sharma speaker was a rotary speaker, similar in design to the Leslie speaker, that was manufactured in the UK by Keith Hitchcock during the 1960s and 1970s.

== History ==
The name "Sharma" came from Hitchcock's two children, Sharon and Mark.

The control panel on a Sharma 900 speaker. This speaker has been modified to include an external switch control.

Hitchcock designed the speaker to directly compete with the Leslie, and consequently it contains similar features, such as a rotating horn for treble frequencies, a drum for bass frequencies, and the same nine-pin amphenol connector interface as contemporary Leslies then in production. However, unlike a typical Leslie, it includes a treble and bass control, and a line level input.

Also, in the Leslie units the horn and bass rotor moved in opposite directions, with a fast and slow motor on each. In the Sharma units, they both rotate in the same direction, with just a fast and slow motor shared. A clutch allows the top and bottom rotors to accelerate at different rates.

The amplifier boards were made for Sharma by HH Electronics. Some of the early Sharma speakers had an eight-pin connector. Some models of speaker also contained rotary and stationary speakers, with separate power amplifiers, which were used on non-Hammond organs such as Lowrey or Wurlitzer.

Sharma speakers fell out of favour due to the introduction of low-cost electronics that could emulate the rotating speaker sound.
