= Audio multicore cable =

Thick cable for carrying many audio signals

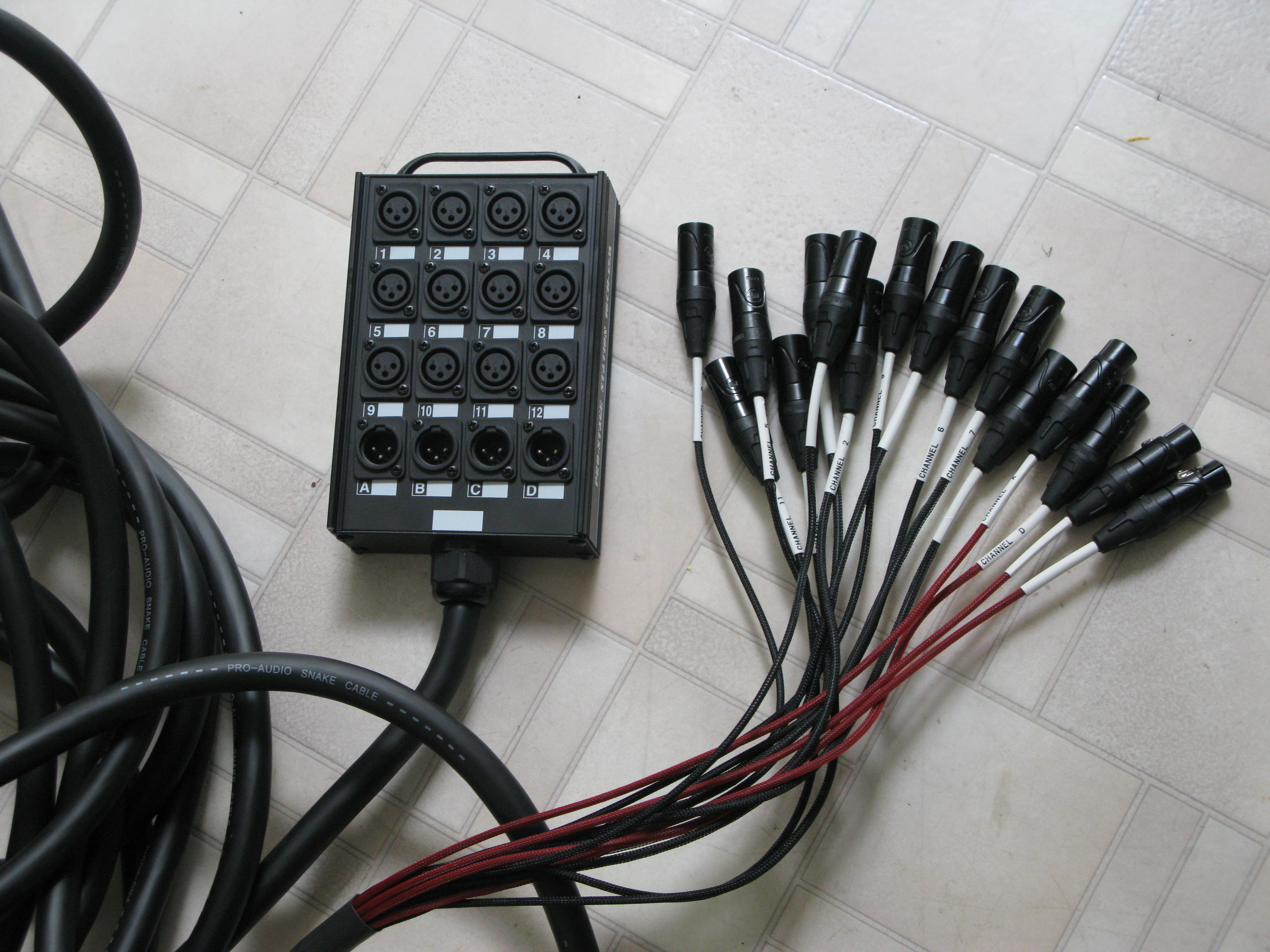
A standard analog multicore cable with 12 sends and 4 returns

An audio multicore cable (often colloquially referred to as a multicore, snake cable or snake) is a thick cable which usually contains 4–64 individual audio cables inside a common, sturdy outer jacket. Audio multicore cables are used to convey many audio signals between two locations, such as in audio recording, sound reinforcement, PA systems and broadcasting. Multicores often route many signals from microphones or musical instruments to a mixing console, and can also carry signals from a mixing console back to speakers.

In audio engineering, the term multicore may refer to the several things:

- an unterminated length of multicore cable intended for analog audio signals (a type of cable harness)
- a terminated cable, with a multipin connector or many individual connectors
- the entire assembly of a terminated multicore cable and stage box

== Applications ==
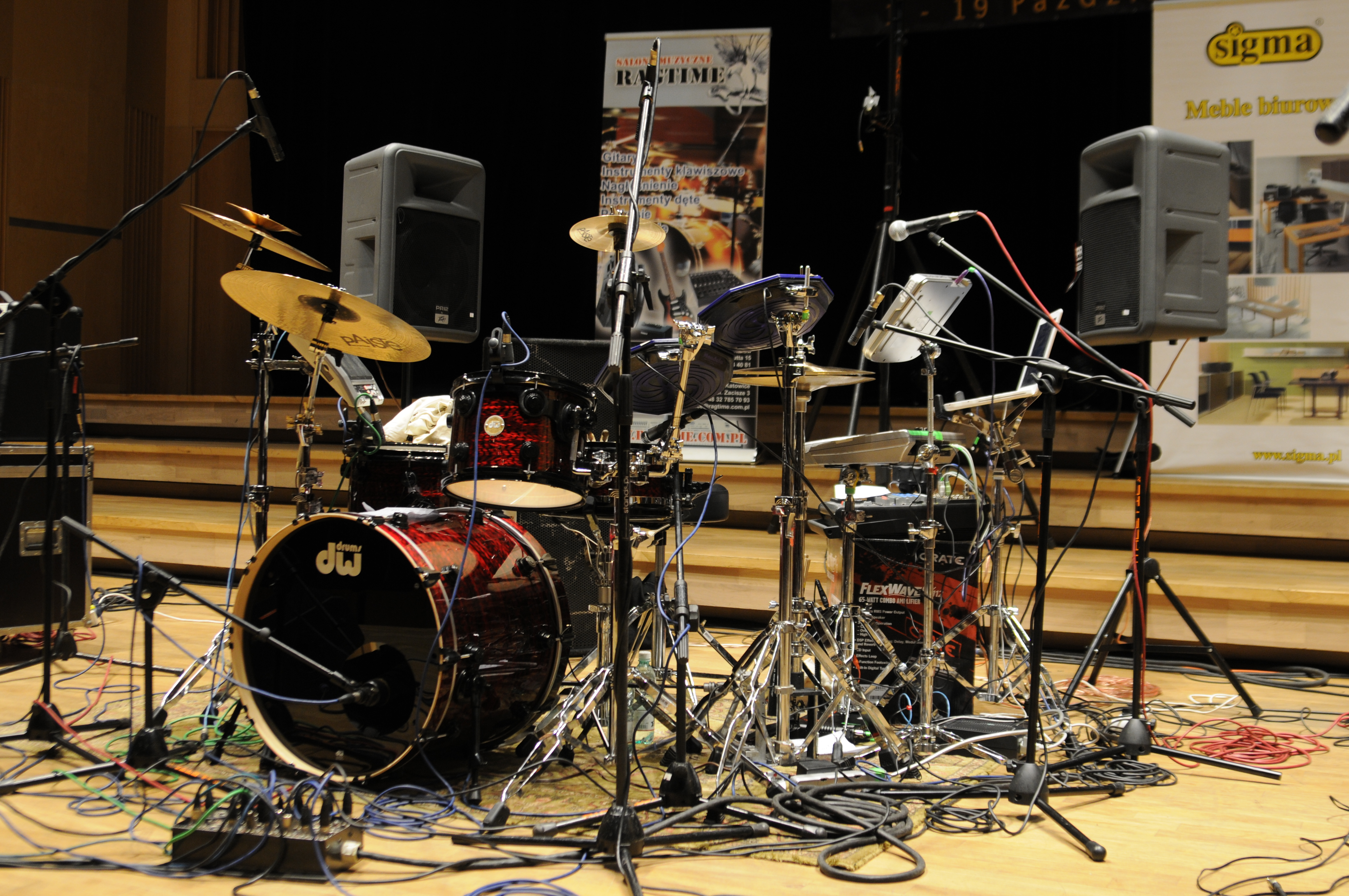
Typical live use of a multicore (thick cable on stage)

Multicores usually create a link between the stage and sound desk, or live room and control room. When used in sound reinforcement, the multicore cable runs from the stage box or microphone splitter to the front-of-house sound desk, where it connects to a mixing console. Portable multicore cables, stored loose or on a drum, enable sound systems to be set up at temporary outdoor locations such as music festivals. Permanent installations, especially recording studios, use stage boxes mounted in the floor or walls, with the multicore cable running through the ceiling or false floor.

Without a snake, a rock band performing onstage, for example, would require 20 or more individual microphone cables running from the stage to the mixing console (typically located at the rear of a venue). This would be harder to set up, would cause tangled cables, and it would be difficult to identify each cable.

== Varieties ==
=== Terminations ===
Different termination methods can be used on each end to suit the application. When individual connectors are used, three pin XLR connectors are most common, although 1/4 inch (6.35 mm) phone connectors are occasionally used. An end with many individual connectors fanning out is sometimes called a tail or fanout, and generally connects directly to a mixing console.

The number of connectors on a multicore is often specified by notation such as "8/4" or "8×4" for 8 sends and 4 returns. Sends usually connect a microphone to a mixing console, and returns connect a mixing console to speakers. A snake with only returns is often called a drive snake.

Some systems use large multipin connectors, colloquially called mults, which make it easier to join snakes together – for example, to connect subsnakes to a main stage box. This allows the system to be expanded by channel count or length. Connectors based on MIL-DTL-5015 (historically MIL-C-5015) are common. Alternatives include EDAC, Burndy, and DB-25 connectors.

Example balanced configurations
Sends/Returns	Channels	Conductors	MIL-DTL-5015
8/0	8	24	24 pin
8/4	12	36	37 pin
12/4	16	48	48 pin
20/4	24	72	85 pin

While the sound reinforcement industry often uses proprietary premade multicores, the television broadcasting industry uses a standardized 12-channel multicore, with a common 37-pin connector on each end known as DT12. Only 36 pins are used and sometimes the unused pin is omitted. DT12 snakes are commonly built into sports venues and stadiums for easy connection of outside broadcasting trucks.

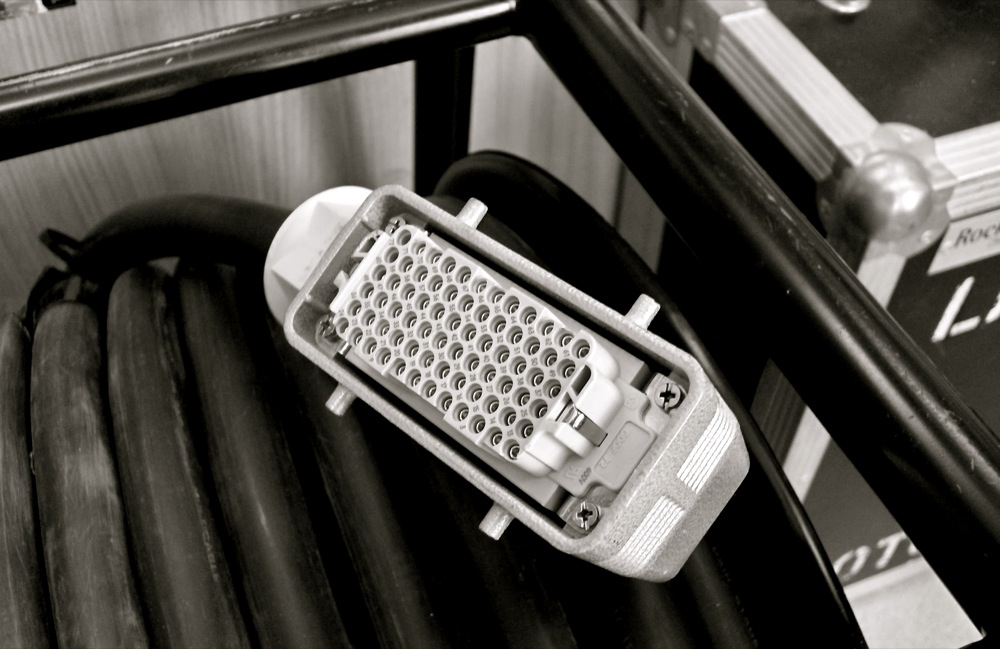
An analog multicore cable on a reel, showing its EDAC multipin connector.

=== Subsnakes ===
A subsnake usually refers to a smaller multicore cable, or one not connected directly to the mixing console. Subsnakes may be used to connect a few instruments from one side of the stage to the main snake, which is neater and allows for shorter patch cables. Subsnakes use smaller stage boxes called drop boxes.

=== Composite multicores ===
Composite multicores combine different types of signals in the one cable. They may contain coaxial cores for video, twisted pair for data or low voltage cores for mains power. Composite multicores are usually used to connect professional video cameras, but they are now gaining usage in live event support with the introduction of the Yamaha PM1D which uses a composite cable to connect it to the stage box.

=== Breakout cables ===
An audio multicore may also function as a type of breakout cable, sometimes referred to as a fan or some variation, if it has a compound (multipin) connector on one end and individual connectors on the other. This is more common in short multicores meant for in-studio connections, such as audio engines, analog-to-digital converters or digital mixing consoles. Multicore cables may also connect to either the front or back of patch panels, when the patch panel is used as an access point or breakout box for connecting external inputs and outputs.

== Cable construction ==
In this section, core refers to a single channel within a multicore cable, whilst conductor refers to a single wire.

=== Core conductor arrangement ===
The vast majority of audio multicore cables consist of a number of twisted-pair copper wires, suitable for balanced audio. To reduce noise, the shield of each channel is often isolated from the other shields. Balanced connections may use XLR connectors or 1/4 inch (6.35 mm) TRS phone connectors.

The broadcast industry tends to use audio multicores containing star quad cables, due to their increased rejection of radio-frequency interference. Some multicore cables designed for unbalanced audio are made, and they contain a number of single-core screened cables.

=== Core screening ===
The individual cables inside the multicore are usually screened independently. This reduces crosstalk between cables and also enables each cable to have a screen or ground that is isolated from other cables, significantly reducing the possibility of ground loops which can cause unwanted hum.

A foil-screen is typically used, comprising thin aluminium wrapped around the group of conductors. An uninsulated drain wire is contained inside the screen to facilitate ground connection. A less common construction is a lapped or braided screen comprising thin wires wrapped around the conductors. This gives improved flexibility, but less effective screening.

=== Core insulation ===
This describes the method used to isolate the screening between individual cores; two approaches are common. The first method has an extruded plastic sheath around each individual core, making the multicore appear like a number of individual audio cables bundled together inside an outer sheath. The second method dispenses with the individual sheath and typically wraps the screening with very thin plastic; in some cases this plastic is bonded to the foil sheath.

The individually sheathed construction has the advantage that individual cores can easily be terminated to individual connectors at the ends of the cable. Its disadvantage is that the size and weight of the cable are increased. When a cable without individual sheaths has to be terminated to multiple connectors, it is common practice to create individual sheaths using heat-shrinkable tubing.

=== Overall screening ===
A small number of multicore cables feature multiple twisted pairs with only a single overall screen. These are virtually obsolete and typically only found in older broadcast installations; the use of individual screens is now virtually standard. Some multicore cables do contain an overall braid screen in addition to the individual screens on each core. This also increases the mechanical durability of the cable.

=== Overall insulation ===
Multicore cables usually have a thick PVC or cross-linked polyethylene sheath protecting the bundle of individual cables. The PVC sheath is extruded around the inner cables, and solidifies to hold the cables in a tight group. This stops the cables from coming out of their tight braid (a phenomenon known as corkscrewing), and absorbs mechanical stress such as a person stepping on the cable. A typical 48 channel multicore has an outside diameter of 1 inch (25 mm).

=== Core identification ===
Different cable manufacturers use different methods of identification for the shielded pairs of cable. Belden have a sequenced color code and a number for each of the conductors in their products of up to 52 pair cables; for their plenum cables each pair is covered with their patented Beldfoil shield that is only conductive on the inner surface. For their portable cables they use a French braid. Canare, Mogami, Clark Wire & Cable and GEPCO mark numbers on the PVC insulation of the individual pairs.

== Digital alternatives ==
Whilst traditional analog multicore cables are common in sound engineering, the advent of digital mixing consoles have made so-called digital multicores favorable for many scenarios where multiple signals need to be run a long distance. Whilst not technically a multicore cable, this newer system performs the same function, but comprises a digital stage box connected directly to a mixing console through a single twisted pair or fiber-optic cable. The stage box converts between analog and digital signals with DA and AD converters.

This has the advantage of being much easier to set up and move, since only a single small cable needs to be run. Digital audio signals are also virtually insusceptible to electromagnetic interference, which is a great advantage in some applications such as long cable runs. Sometimes the only cable run between the stage and sound desk is a single digital cable, and all audio processing occurs in digital format at the mixing console and stage box.

Common protocols used for digital multicores include audio over Ethernet and AES10 (MADI).
