= Multi-strand cable =

Multi-strand cable may refer to:

- cable with stranded wire, whether single or multi-wire or -core
- multi-wire cable, though this somewhat common usage is technically inaccurate
  - multi-core cable, a multi-wire cable whose multiple conductors are arranged around separate cores – this too is technically inaccurate
