= Amphenol connector =

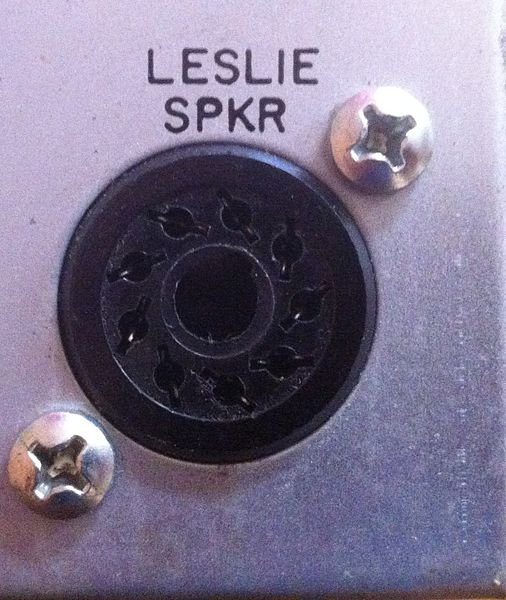
A 9 pin amphenol connector socket, used to connect a Leslie speaker

The term Amphenol connector refers to various electronics connectors that are introduced, or made primarily, by Amphenol Corp. Depending on the area of electronics concerned, it may refer specifically to:

- MIL-DTL-5015 / MIL-C-5015, a circular connector
- MIL-DTL-26482 / MIL-C-26482, a circular bayonet connector
- RJ21, used in aggregated telecommunications cabling
- Micro ribbon, used to connect a personal computer to printers or SCSI equipment
- ARINC 828, a repurposing of MIL-DTL-38999.
- UHF connector, a threaded RF coaxial connector
- A circular connector, usually consisting of 6, 9 or 11 pins, used to connect a Hammond organ to a Leslie speaker.

== See also ==
- MC4 connector
- Solar micro-inverter
