= Arthur J. Schmitt =

- Born: 14 June 1893; Chicago, Ilionis, US
- Died: 29 March 1971 (aged 77)
- Occupation: Businessman
- Known for: Founder of Amphenol Corporation, Fournier Institute of Technology, and Arthur J Schmitt Foundation

Arthur J. Schmitt (14 June 1893 – 29 March 1971) was an American engineer, inventor, entrepreneur and philanthropist. In 1932, he founded American Phenolic Corp (which became Amphenol) when he discovered that insulating plastic could effectively be used to produce tube sockets in a quicker and simpler method than using Bakelite or ceramic. Under his leadership, Amphenol developed and manufactured equipment for radios, military equipment during World War II, and various industrial uses after the war.

In 1941, the Arthur J. Schmitt Foundation purchased the property that would become the Fournier Institute of Technology in Lemont, Illinois. The former seminary was converted into a two-year high school and a four-year college, with the goal of training engineers for service in World War II. The Fournier Institute of Technology opened in 1943, and college-level classes commenced in 1947. Due to low enrollment and rising operating costs, the institute graduated its last high school class in 1951, and its last college class in 1955. DePaul University Special Collections and Archives holds a collection of historical and legal documents, correspondence, publications, and photographs related to the Fournier Institute of Technology, donated by the Arthur J. Schmitt Foundation. The Arthur J. Schmitt Foundation continues to provide scholarships and fellowships at numerous Catholic-based universities in the Chicago and surrounding Great Lakes area, such as DePaul University and Saint Xavier University and the graduate schools at Loyola University Chicago, University of Notre Dame, and Marquette University (Milwaukee, WI). The Foundation also supports scholarships at a handful of high schools.

Schmitt turned his financial success into significant philanthropic efforts that continue to propagate his moral and ethical values.
