= Leslie speaker =

Electric amplifier and loudspeaker

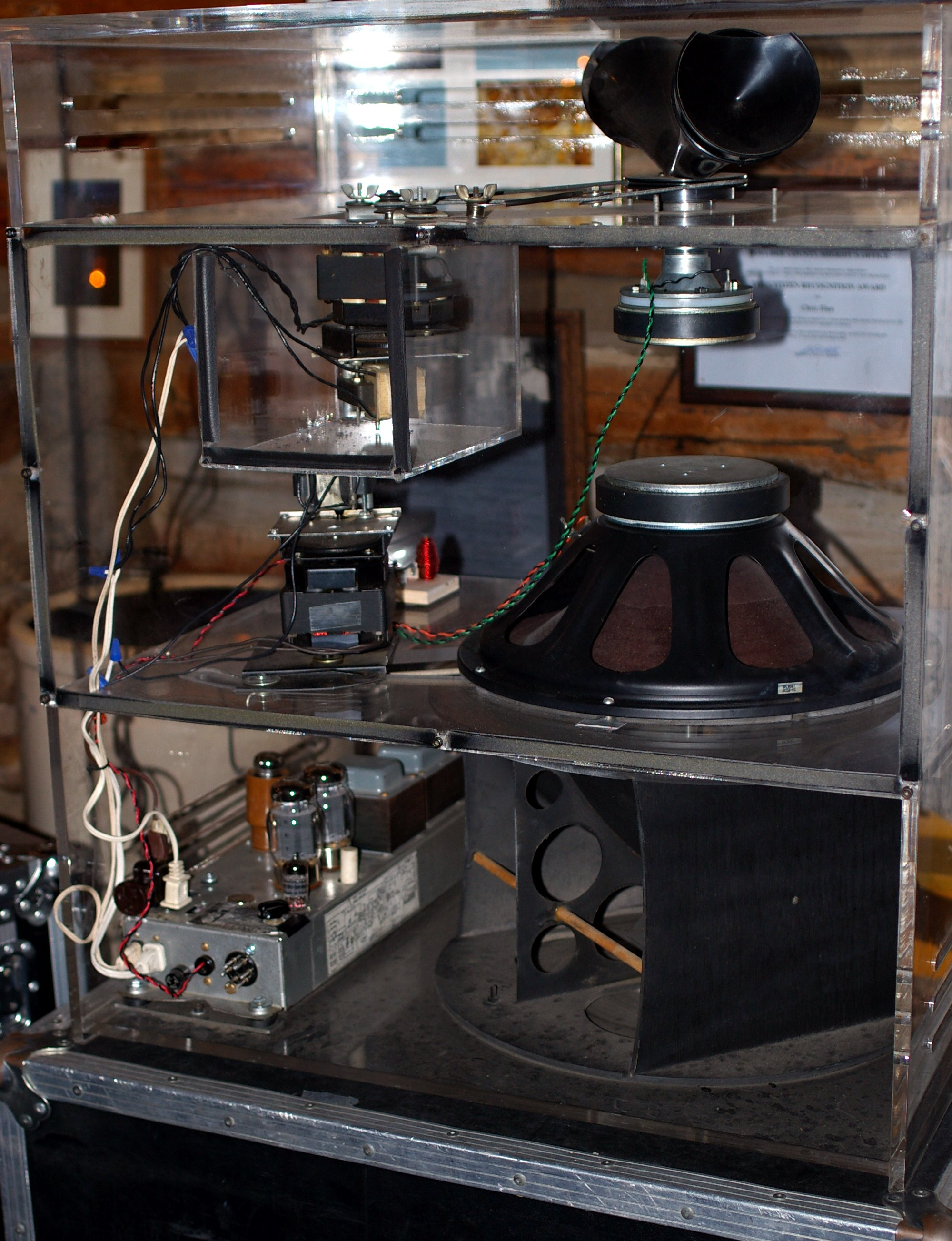
A Leslie speaker in a clear plastic cabinet

Leslie Sound
A chord is played on an organ while the Leslie speaker is switched from chorale to tremolo and back again

The Leslie speaker is a combined amplifier and loudspeaker that modifies the sound of an electric musical instrument by rotating a baffle chamber (drum) in front of the loudspeaker. A similar effect is provided by a rotating system of horns in front of the treble driver. It is most commonly associated with the electric Hammond organ, though it was later used for the electric guitar and other instruments. A typical Leslie speaker contains an amplifier, a treble horn and a bass speaker—though specific components depend upon the model. Some models have two speed settings, known as chorale and tremolo.

The speaker is named after its inventor, Donald Leslie, who began working in the late 1930s to get a speaker for a Hammond organ that better emulated a pipe or theatre organ, and discovered that baffles rotating along the axis of the speaker cone gave the best effect. Hammond was not interested in marketing or selling the speakers, so Leslie sold them himself as an add-on, targeting other organs as well as Hammond, beginning in 1941. The sound of the organ being played through his speaker received national radio exposure across the US, and it became a commercial and critical success, becoming popular with jazz organists. In 1965, Leslie sold his business to CBS who, in 1980, sold it to Hammond. Suzuki Musical Instrument Corporation subsequently acquired the Hammond and Leslie brands.

Because the Leslie is a sound modification device in its own right, various attempts have been made to simulate the effect using electronic effect units. These include the Uni-Vibe, the Neo Ventilator, and Hammond-Suzuki's own simulator in a box.

== History ==
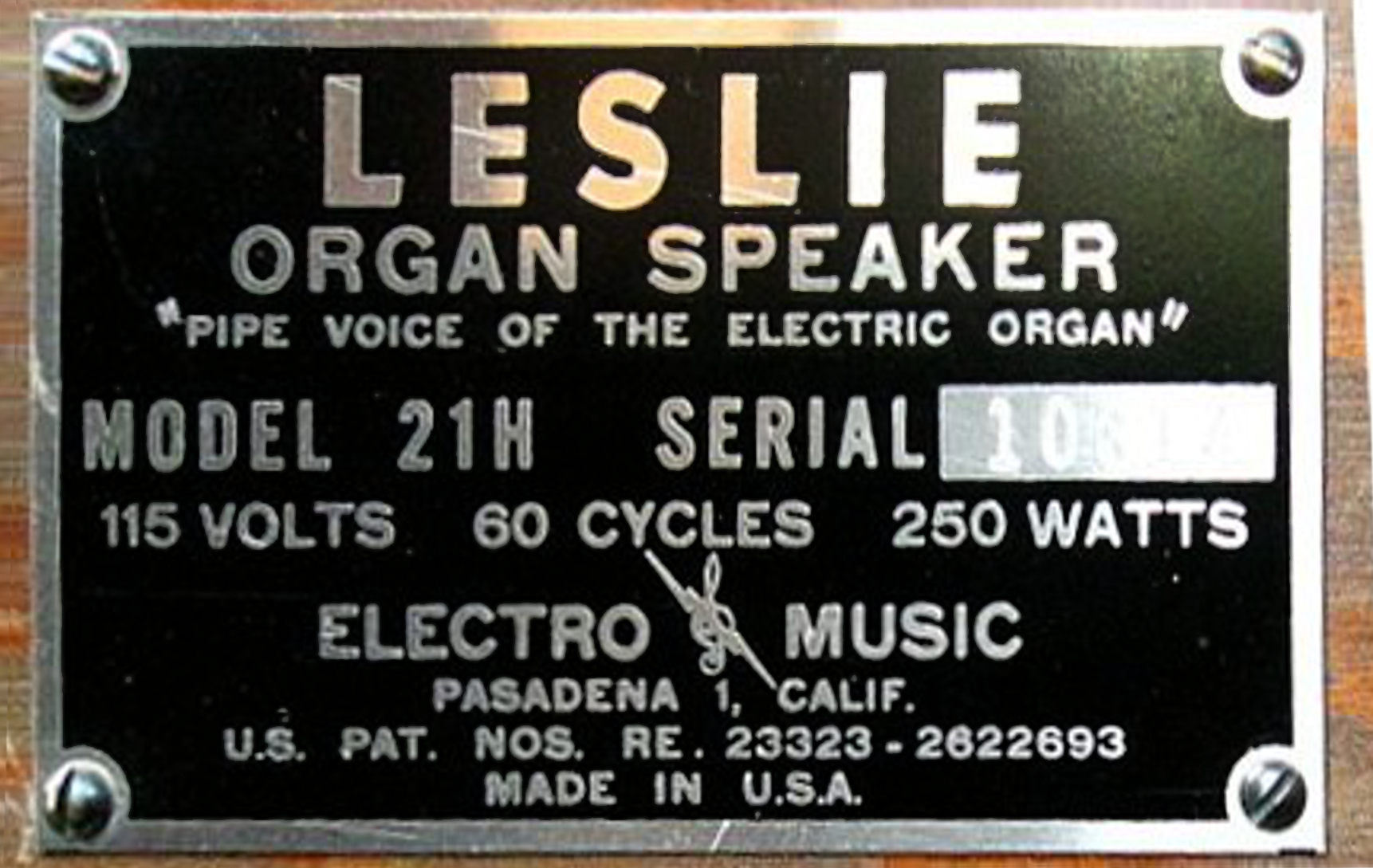
Identification plate with the slogan "Pipe Voice of the Electric Organ"

Donald Leslie worked as a radio service engineer at Barker Brothers Department Store in Los Angeles, which sold and repaired Hammond organs. He bought one in 1937, hoping it would be a suitable substitute for a pipe organ. He was disappointed, however, with the sound in his home compared to the large showroom where he originally heard it. Consequently, he attempted to design a speaker to overcome this. He initially tried making a cabinet similar to Hammond's, but soon concluded that pipe organs produced a spatially varied sound because of the different location of each pipe. He set out to emulate this by making a moving speaker. He tried various combinations of speakers and speeds, and discovered that a single one running at what's now known as the "tremolo" speed worked best. After further experimentation, he decided that splitting the signal into a rotating drum and horn helped accentuate bass and treble frequencies.

By 1940, Leslie decided his prototype was ready to market, and went to the Hammond Organ Company to demonstrate it. Laurens Hammond, however, was not impressed with Leslie's attempt to better his own organ design, and declined to market it. The company even changed the speaker interface on their organs to make them "Leslie-proof," though Leslie quickly worked around this. Leslie began manufacturing the speaker in 1941—initially under a variety of names, including Vibratone, Brittain Speakers, Hollywood Speakers, and Crawford Speakers. He returned to the name "Leslie Vibratone" in 1947. To counteract Hammond's slogan "Music's Most Glorious Voice," Leslie added a similar slogan, "Pipe Voice of the Electric Organ" to the plates. He eventually owned nearly 50 patents on the speaker.

Leslie manufactured the speaker to work with other organs besides Hammond, including Wurlitzer, Conn, Thomas and Baldwin. He never particularly liked Hammond organs, once remarking "I hate those damn things."

In 1965, Leslie sold his Electro Music company to CBS, which had also acquired the Fender guitar company. In 1980, the Hammond Corporation finally bought Electro Music and the Leslie name from CBS. After Hammond went out of business in 1986, a former engineer re-established Electro Music, licensing the name from Noel Crabbe, who had acquired the rights to Hammond. It was subsequently sold to Suzuki in 1992, who continue to manufacture the speaker.

== Features ==
A diagram showing the key components of a Leslie speaker

A Leslie speaker consists of a number of individual components. The audio signal enters the amplifier from the instrument. Once amplified, the signal travels to an audio crossover, which splits it into separate frequency bands that can be individually routed to each loudspeaker. Different models have different combinations of speakers, but the most common model, the 122, consists of a single 15" woofer for bass and a single compression driver and acoustic horn for treble. The audio emitted by the speakers is isolated inside an enclosure, aside from a number of outlets that lead towards either a rotating horn or drum. Electric motors rotate both horn and drum at variable speeds. The Leslie uses a dual horn; its symmetry is used for mechanical balance, however one of the horns is audibly blocked.

The only control common to all Leslie speakers is a dial that controls the master volume. This is normally set up once and then left, since the organ's expression pedal normally controls the volume. Leslie recommended playing the organ at full volume with all stops (drawbars) pulled out and adjusting the volume just before distortion occurs. However, the distorted sound of an overdriven vacuum tube amplifier can be a desirable sound, to the extent that modern Leslie simulators have an explicit "overdrive" setting.

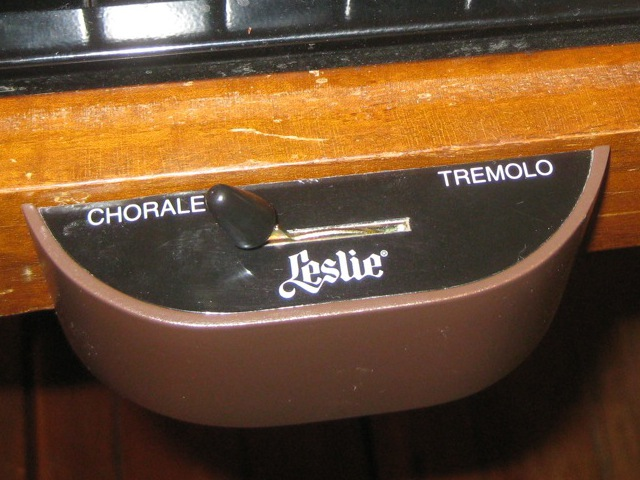
The half-moon switch on a Hammond organ that changes setting on the Leslie speaker between "chorale" and "tremolo"

The Leslie speaker' output is normally controlled by a switch mounted on the instrument featuring two settings, "chorale" and "tremolo". Some early models were limited to "off" and "tremolo", and some later models had all three settings. The switch can be used while notes are being played, and the sound of changing between the two settings is part of the characteristic sound. On both settings, the treble horn rotates slightly faster than the bass woofer; about 50 revolutions per minute (rpm) for "chorale" and 400 rpm for "tremolo", compared to the woofer's 40 rpm and 340 rpm respectively.

Unlike most popular music amplifiers, that use jack plugs to connect to instruments, Leslie speakers use an Amphenol connector to interface directly to an organ via a console connector. The type and design of the connector depends on the organ and model of Leslie speaker.

Older models that used tube power amplifiers use a variety of six-pin connectors, while later models use nine-pin connectors. In all cases, for a single organ–Leslie configuration, the AC power, audio and control signals are all carried on the connector, and the design of the pin layouts varies between organs and speakers. Care is taken when attempting to service them since an incorrectly or poorly wired cable can cause permanent damage to the organ or speaker, or result in electrocution. It is also possible to connect multiple Leslie speakers to a single organ, by using a power relay that provides the necessary AC current.

A separate device, known as the combo preamp, is necessary to connect a vintage Leslie to another instrument such as a guitar. This combines a separate AC input and line level input onto a single Amphenol connector, and provide a footswitch to select between the speeds of the Leslie. Modern products such as the Trek II UC-1A allow any instrument with a phone jack connection to use a variety of Leslie speakers.

Modern Leslie speakers have 11-pin interfaces that are safer to service, as AC power is carried separately using standard IEC connectors. The Hammond-Suzuki Leslie 2101 also includes line in and line out jacks, so a combo preamp is no longer required. Its settings can also be controlled via MIDI.

== Models ==
=== Single speed ===
The initial models of Leslie speakers did not have the "chorale" setting. The control switch was simply a choice between "off" and "tremolo". The first model of Leslie produced was the 30A. It emulated Hammond's DXR-20 tone cabinet, which used moving drums but only produced amplitude modulation, not frequency modulation. It contained a 15-inch (380 mm) drum and the power amplifier was housed in the top of the unit, to allow easy repair. This was superseded between 1947 and 1949 by the 31H, also known as the "Tall Boy". It was similar in appearance to the 30A, but contained additional louvres along the top of the cabinet. Also, reflectors were placed on the end of the horn, to allow the treble signal to exit the unit through the sides, rather than on the top.

The next models Leslie produced were the 21H and the 22H, which had a cabinet in a similar styling to the better known 122, with the same dimensions and louvres. They were powered by a 40 watt tube amplifier.

=== Dual speed ===
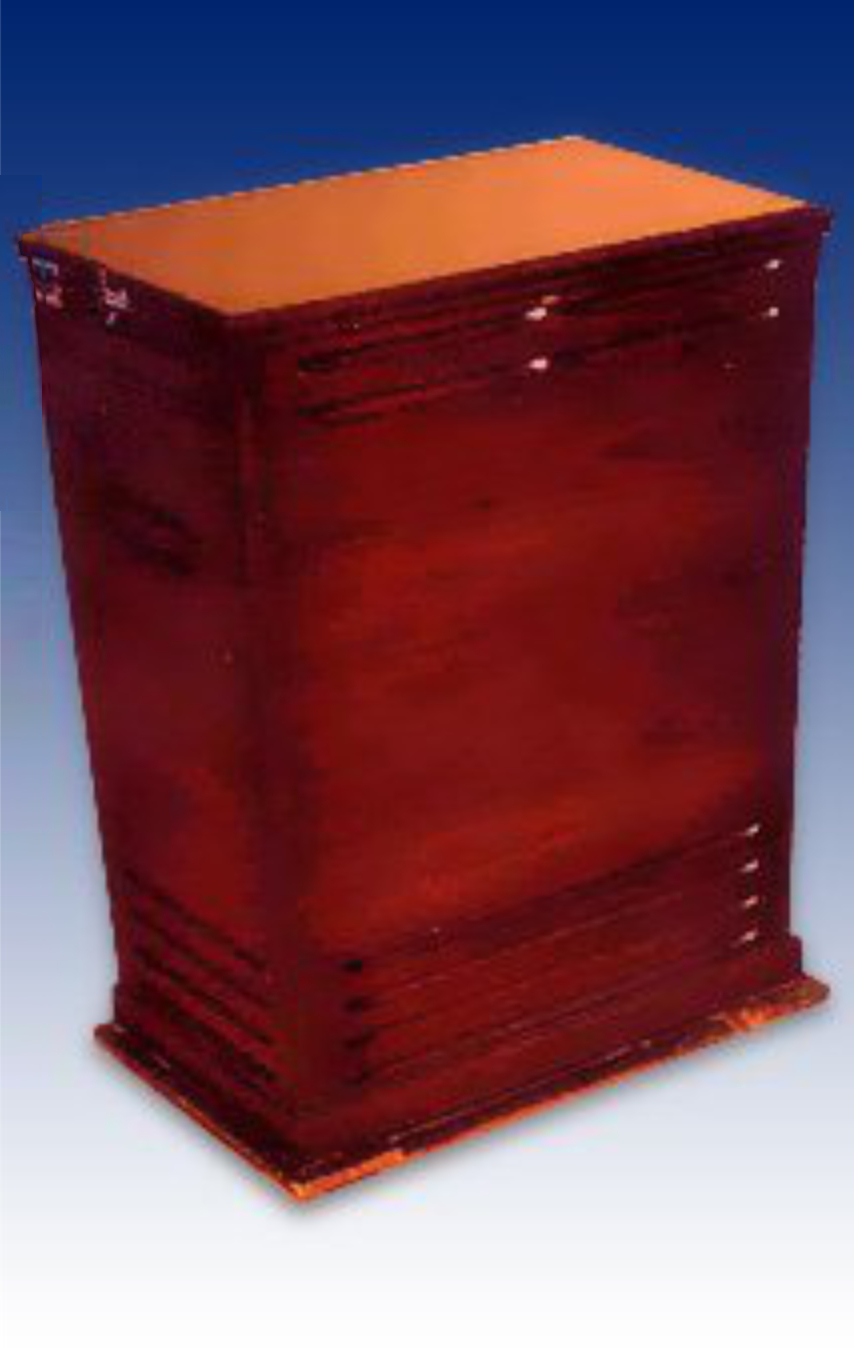
A Leslie 122 speaker

The 122 is the most popular Leslie. It was specifically designed for the Hammond organ and is the model most commonly identified with it. It is 41 inches (1,000 mm) high, offers two different speeds for chorale and tremolo, and has a 40 watt tube amplifier. The 122 is the most adaptable to being recorded, as it has a balanced signal which eliminates AC hum and other noise. The 122RV was the same model, but with an additional reverb amplifier, which fed through to a separate static speaker. A slightly smaller version, the 33-inch (840 mm) 142 was available. Hammond-Suzuki currently manufacture the 122A, a straight reissue of the 122, and the 122XB, which contains a modern 11-pin adapter, an IECC AC adaptor, line-in, and a jack socket for a footswitch to control the speed. This eliminates the need for a combo preamp.

The 147 is the "universal" version of the 122, designed for many organs, and has a different amplifier input and motor speed control, but is otherwise identical. The signal input is unbalanced, allowing a simpler connection to organs that have a built-in speaker system, such as the Hammond A100, or a Wurlitzer. The motor speed switching uses a separate AC signal, rather than the DC voltage control of the 122. In operation, the 122 has a lower susceptibility to induced noise, and a delay between operation of the speed control and the actual change in speed. As with the 122 and 142, the 145 is identical to the 147, except that it is housed in a 33-inch (840 mm) cabinet, and thus slightly easier to move. As with the 122, Hammond-Suzuki manufactures a modern replacement, the 147A. The model X-77, released in 1968, was designed to accompany Hammond's new tonewheel / transistor organ, the X-66. It contained seven different tab controls and six speakers. It has a completely different interface from other Leslies, using a 12-pin amphenol connector.

=== Pro-Line ===
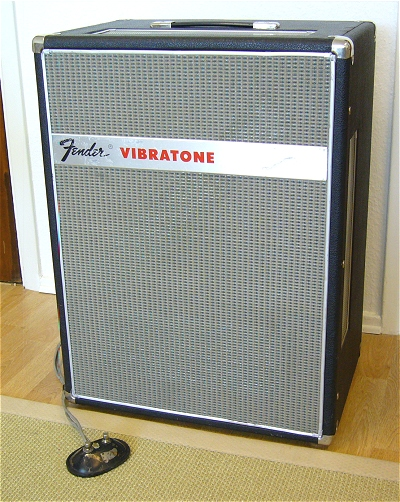
Fender Vibratone reissue of the Leslie 16

By the late 1960s, gigging musicians were finding that older Leslies like the 122 were not loud enough for large venues, which led to the introduction of the "Pro Line" series. These Leslies had louder solid-state power amplifiers, and were mounted on casters for ease of portability. The first models Leslie manufactured were the 900 and 910, which contained a 100 watt, three-channel power amplifier. Both could split into two sections. The most popular version of the Pro-Line series was the 760. It was a smaller version of the 900 and 910, and contained a 40 watt treble and 50 watt bass amplifier. A smaller, more portable version of the 760 is the 820. It is a solid-state cabinet like the 760, and it connects to the organ with a 9-pin connector as well. However, it is only 31 inches (790 mm) high and has only a single rotor with a full-range 12-inch speaker.

The Pro-Line series was durable and fault-tolerant, with many models lasting for years. However, because they used solid-state amplifiers, they are not as highly regarded as the older tube-based Leslies, because they lack the characteristic sound when the amp is overdriven.

The smallest Leslie is the Model 16, made in 1970. It has a Fender-like speaker body and a rotating foam dispersion block. It was built for guitarists, portable, and had "Leslie" written on the front. It contained just a single 10-inch speaker, and was designed to be powered by an external amplifier, and contained an additional output for an extension speaker. Control of the speaker was via two switches, one of which controlled the speed and one switched the rotors on and off. It was also released later as the Fender Vibratone.

=== Hammond-Suzuki ===
As well as the 122A and 147A reissues, as of 2005 Hammond-Suzuki made smaller and transportable Leslies using modern technology. The 2101 is 20 inches (520 mm) high and has a rotating horn as found on the 122 and 147, along with a pair of 2-inch (51 mm) compression drivers and two 5-inch (130 mm) woofers. The unit provides two separate inputs so different instruments can be plugged into the rotary and stationary components respectively. The 2121 is a 15-inch (380 mm) stationary speaker that uses digital signal processing to emulate the rotating drum found in older Leslies. The 3300 includes a 300 watt power amplifier.

== Sound generation ==
An animation showing the behavior of a Leslie speaker when running. 1 = Horn enclosure 2 = Compression driver 3 = Treble motor 4 = Crossover 5 = Bass motor 6 = Woofer 7 = Drum enclosure 8 = Drum 9 = Cabinet Amplifier not pictured

The Leslie is specifically designed, via reproduction of the Doppler effect, to alter or modify sound. As the sound source is rotated around a specific pivot point, it produces tremolo (the modulation of amplitude) and a variation in pitch. This produces a sequence of frequency modulated sidebands. To stop a Leslie's rotor, a special brake circuit was added to the Leslie motor controls, that incorporated an electronic relay by producing a half-wave of direct current.

Much of the Leslie's unique tone is due to the fact that the system is at least partially enclosed, whereby linear louvres along the sides and front of the unit can vent the sound from within the box after the sound has bounced around inside, mellowing it. The crossover is deliberately set to 800 Hz to give the optimum balance between the horn and the drum, and is considered an integral part of the speaker. The tone is also affected by the wood used. Tone differences, due to cost cutting using particle board for speaker and rotor shelves instead of the previous plywood, are evident in the Leslie's sound. The thinner ply of the top of the cabinet adds a certain resonance as well. Like an acoustic instrument, a Leslie's tone is uniquely defined by its cabinet design and construction, the amplifier, crossover and speakers used, and the motors—not merely by the spinning of rotors.

== Miking ==
Because a Leslie speaker modifies as well as amplifies the sound, the output cannot simply be connected to a larger PA system if the volume onstage from the built-in amplifier is inadequate. This is particularly problematic for an older Leslie like the 122 or 147, which only has a 40 watt RMS power amplifier. Instead, microphones are placed around the Leslie, and the output from these is connected to the PA. A typical setup for onstage miking is to use two microphones placed on opposite sides of the horn and a single microphone on the drum.

Miking a Leslie is also important in a recording studio, as the choice and positioning of microphones determines the overall recorded sound. A popular recommendation is two Shure SM57s on the horn and a Sennheiser MD 421 on the drum. Recording Magazine's Dave Martin suggests a similar setup, with various microphone models used as stereo pairs on the horn but using an Electro-Voice RE20 on the drum instead. Keith Emerson recorded his Leslie using a single mic each on the horn and the drum, but with the covers removed.

== Clones and simulations ==
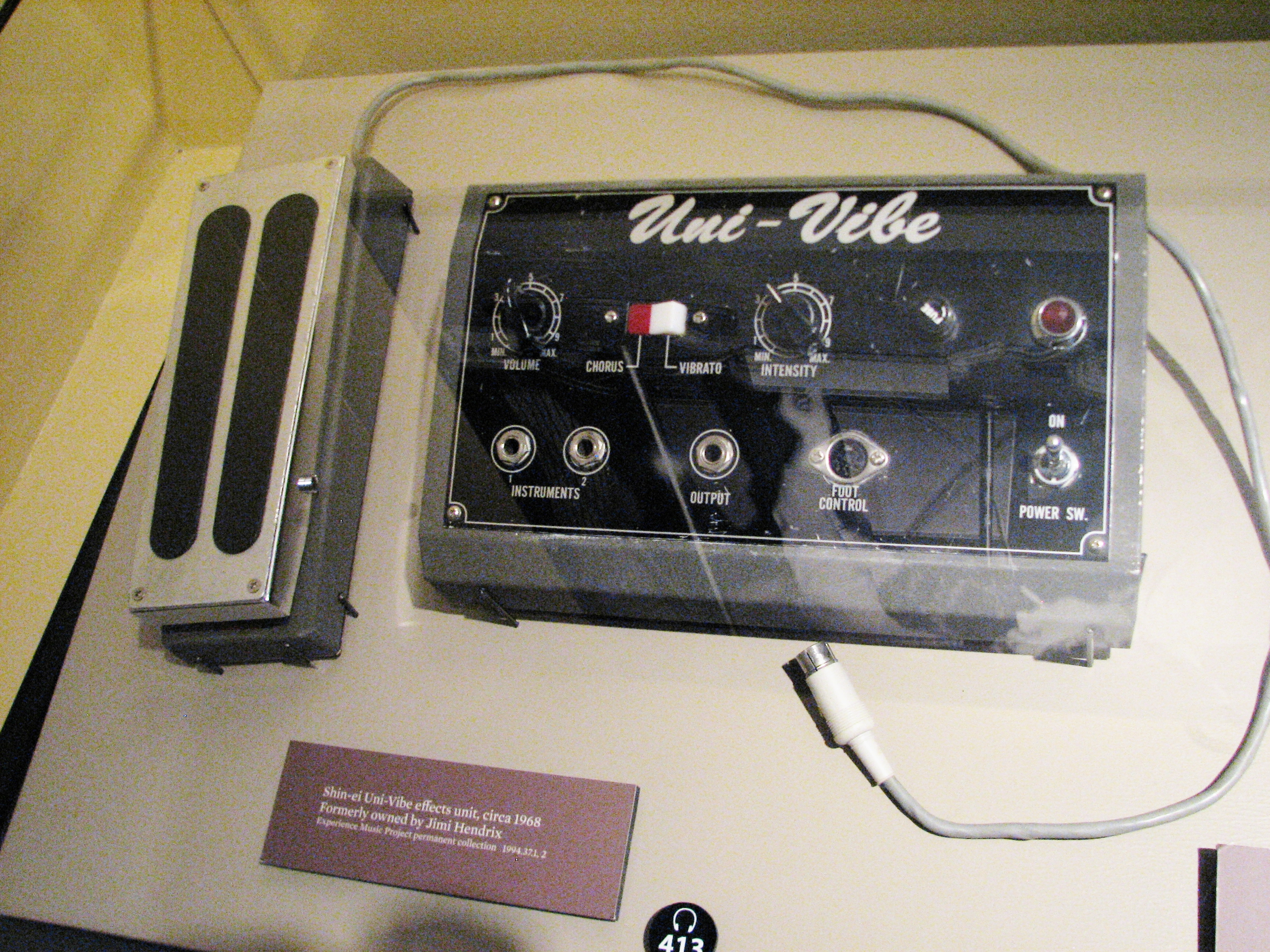
The Uni-Vibe was an early adaptation as an effects pedal. This model was once used by Jimi Hendrix.

While the Leslie speaker is still made and sold, similar effects can now be obtained via analogue electronic devices and digital emulation. Chorus and phase shifter devices can give an approximation of the sounds produced by a Leslie speaker. The Uni-Vibe, a four-stage phase shifter, was specifically marketed as a low-cost Leslie substitute for guitarists, and used a foot-operated fast/slow switch similar to the combo preamp. The pedal was popular, and notable users included Jimi Hendrix, David Gilmour and Robin Trower, but vintage units tend not to be in good condition now due to the degradation of capacitors in the unit. Although the sound of a Leslie speaker heard in person is quite distinct, digital clones have become increasingly better at emulating it.

Most modern keyboards that emulate the Hammond organ also include a Leslie simulator, including Hammond's own XK-3c and the Nord Electro. However, there is still a market for standalone simulators. Hughes & Kettner's Rotosphere has received good reviews for accurately producing the sound of a Leslie speaker with a tube amplifier. The Neo Ventilator has been particularly praised for its accuracy in emulating the sound of a Leslie. Sound on Sound's Mark Ashfield described it in 2011 as "quite simply the best Leslie speaker simulator to date", while a Keyboard Magazine reviewer was "blown away by how authentic the Ventilator sounds". In 2013, Hammond-Suzuki started manufacturing their own Leslie simulator in a stomp box.

== Notable users ==
=== Early adopters ===
Leslie never advertised his speakers. After demonstrating a prototype with Bob Mitchell, an organist with radio station KFI in Los Angeles, a contract was made to install another prototype in the station's studios, where Mitchell would be the only organist authorized to use it. Mitchell was so impressed that he tried to patent the speaker, but discovered that he could not. Soon afterwards, Mitchell became an organist with the Mutual Broadcasting System, and played a Hammond with the Leslie on its shows, ensuring national exposure for the sound. The Leslie was subsequently a standard component of several notable jazz organists, including Jimmy Smith, Jack McDuff, Jimmy McGriff and Shirley Scott. Graham Bond was the first notable British organist to play a Hammond through a Leslie.

=== Pioneering usages ===
Although the Beatles are often credited as such, they were not the first to experiment with processing other sounds through a Leslie speaker. Producer Lou Adler had been experimenting with the technique as early as 1963, and one of the first recordings to feature vocals recorded through a Leslie speaker was the 1964 single "She Rides with Me", written by Beach Boys leader Brian Wilson and performed by singer Paul Petersen. According to Petersen, "I got a call from Lou Adler on New Years Eve 1963 in Las Vegas. He asked me to come to LA right away to cut a Brian Wilson song. When I got to RCA's studio, the track had already been cut by Brian. The only people there were Lou and two engineers. Lou rigged up the Leslie organ sound for the vocals, and that was it." Adler also used the effect on the simultaneously released "He Don't Love Me" by Shelley Fabares. Wilson himself used the effect on the guitar sound for the Beach Boys' July 1965 song "You're So Good to Me".

Although "She Rides with Me" was not a hit record, Leslie-processed sounds soon became a prominent feature of psychedelic music. The Beatles first recorded with a Leslie in June 1965 when George Harrison was overdubbing one of his lead guitar parts on "It's Only Love". According to author Andy Babiuk, the band's "Tomorrow Never Knows" (1966) marked the first time that a vocal was recorded using a microphone wired directly into the input of a Leslie, after John Lennon had asked for his voice to sound "as though I'm the Dalai Lama singing from the highest mountain top". They went on to use a Leslie throughout the sessions for Revolver in 1966.

The Beatles inspired others to use the speaker. Harrison played through a Leslie in his guest appearance on Cream's song "Badge" (1969), and Richard Wright used a similar setup when recording with Pink Floyd.

== See also ==
- Sharma speaker
