= Gain stage =

Managing gain in audio engineering

In audio engineering, a gain stage is a point during an audio signal flow that the engineer can make adjustments to the level, such as a fader on a mixing console or in a DAW. Gain staging is the process of managing the relative levels in each step of an audio signal flow to prevent introduction of noise and distortion, feeding the inserts, such as equalizers and compressors with the right amount of signal, particularly in the analogue realm. Ideal gain staging occurs when each component in an audio signal flow is receiving and transmitting signal in the optimum region of its dynamic range.

In an audio system containing both microphones and loudspeakers, the total amount of gain in the system can exceed 100 dB. This is usually broken up into a number of smaller steps, called gain stages, where the signal is amplified or attenuated as needed before reaching the loudspeaker.

In a signal flow beginning with an acoustic sound source (such as a musical instrument or singer), the Microphone preamplifier is typically the first electronically adjustable gain stage, where the signal is amplified by as much as 95 dB in exceptional cases. Before reaching the microphone, the sound source is subject to the Inverse-square law, which states that sound intensity diminishes as distance between the sound source and the microphone increases. This means that (1) moving the microphone closer to the sound source increases the signal level produced by the microphone, and (2) moving the microphone further away from undesirable noise sources will diminish the amount of noise in the microphone signal. Microphone placement is therefore an important aspect of gain staging.

Following microphone placement and the microphone preamplifier, the audio signal has been amplified to Line level, and can be processed by a device capable of accepting a line-level signal.
