= Stage box =

Interface device used in sound reinforcement

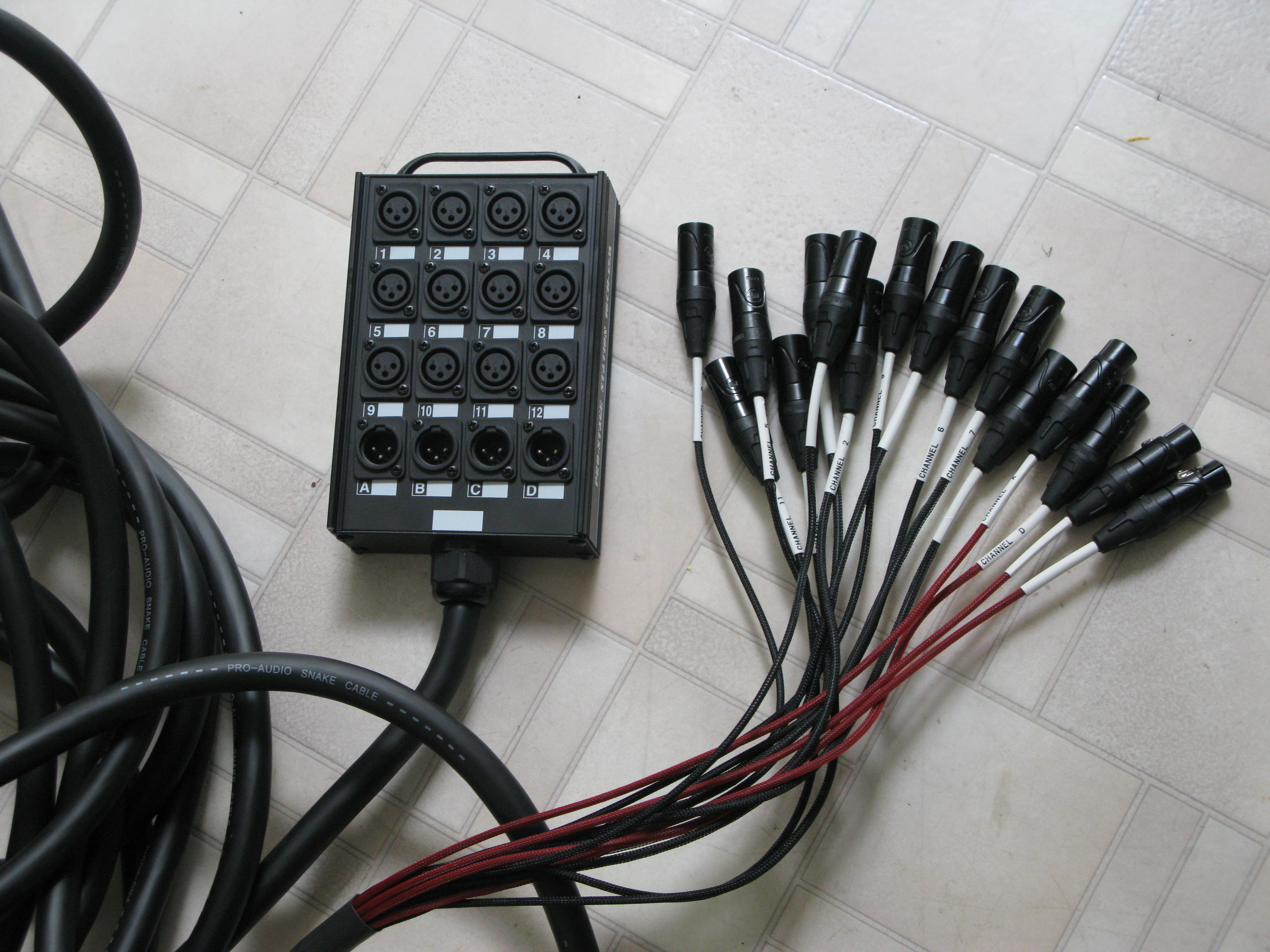
A typical analog stage box connected to a multicore cable (corresponding terminated wires are also visible)

A stage box is an interface device used in sound reinforcement and recording studios to connect equipment to a mixing console. It provides a central location to connect microphones, instruments, and speakers to a multicore cable (snake), which allows the sound desk to be further from the stage and simplifies setup.

Stage boxes typically consist of a rugged metal enclosure, with XLR connectors on the front whose signals are routed through a snake. In the traditional sense, a stage box is effectively a simple termination box at the end of an analog multicore cable. However, many modern stage boxes convert between analog and digital, using a single twisted pair cable instead of an analog multicore.

== Design ==
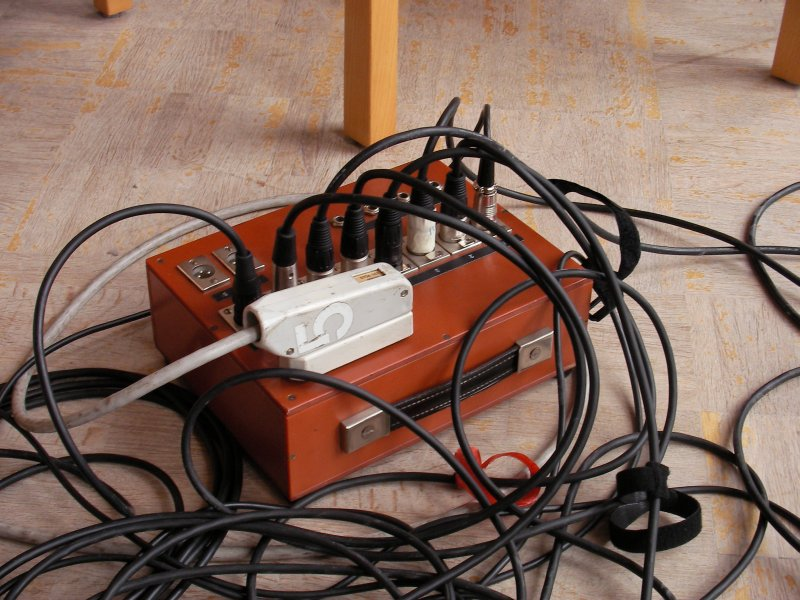
Analog stage box with integrated DI units.

Stage boxes typically house 16–32 female XLR connectors and 4–8 male connectors, but occasionally 1/4 inch (6.35 mm) phone connectors are used instead. These connections to the mixer are often called sends (inputs) and returns (outputs). The connector configuration depends on the number of conductors in the multicore cable (for analog signals), or the bandwidth (for digital signals). Some stage boxes are rack-mountable which allows them to be mounted in either a road case or equipment rack. Smaller stage boxes use compact metal cases which may sit on a stage inconspicuously. Labels on the stage box make it easier to identify cables for troubleshooting and setup.

Many stage boxes, especially digital ones, include microphone preamps. This is intended to amplify the signal as early as possible in the signal flow in order to minimize interference in the cabling. However, this is unfavorable for some sound engineers who prefer the tone of a specific preamp. Another feature of some stage boxes is integrated DI interfaces for direct connection of instruments.

== Digital stage boxes ==
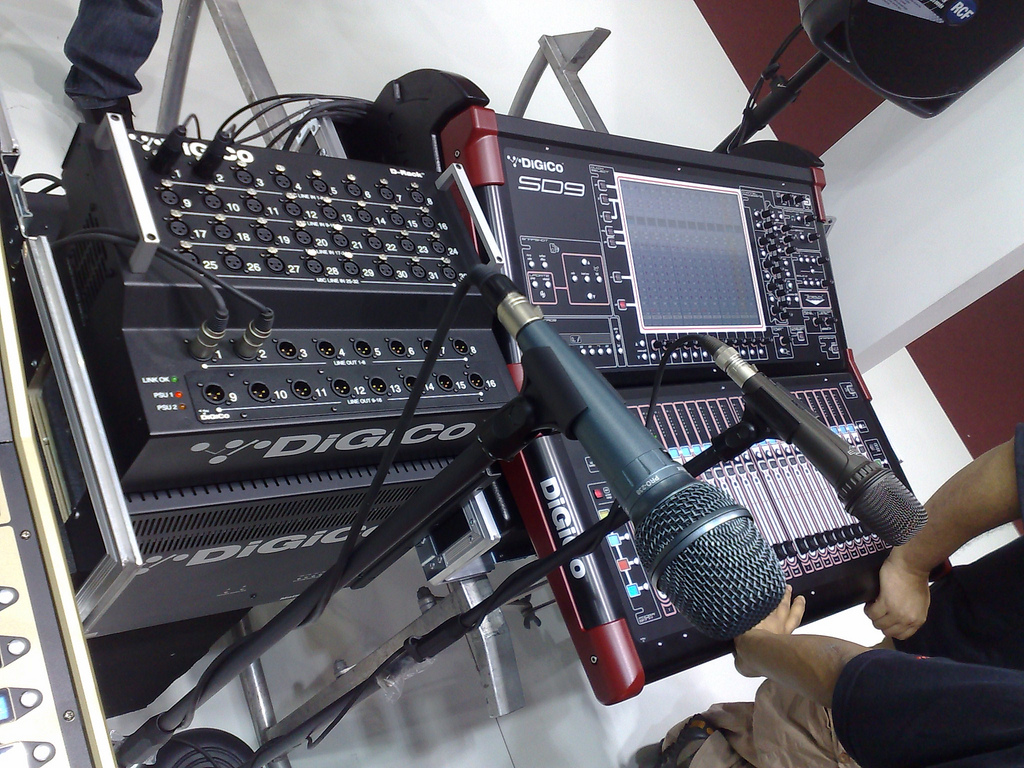
DiGiCo D-Rack digital stage box next to a SD9 mixer

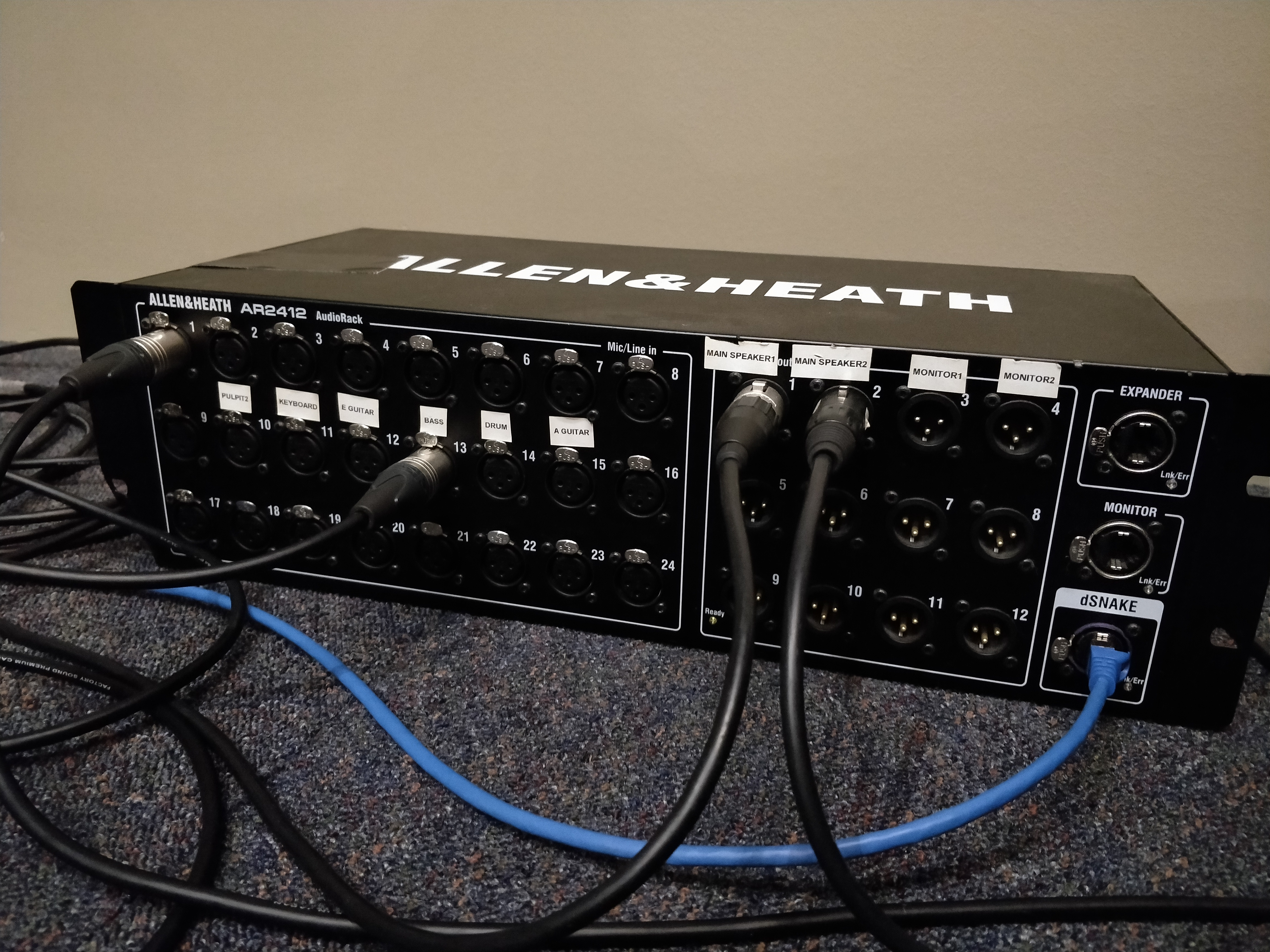
Allen & Heath AR2412 digital stage box, with a Cat 7 cable carrying digital audio to the mixing console

Digital mixing consoles inherently introduce conversion between analog and digital signals. Since digital signals are practically immune to noise, it is preferable to use them for long cable runs. As a result, many modern stage boxes contain an array of DACs and ADCs. This allows all the signals to be transmitted over a single twisted pair cable rather than a bulkier and more expensive analog multicore. Digital stage boxes are typically easier to set up and more reliable than their analog counterparts, and their cables are much more compact. Some digital stage boxes are designed for use with analog mixers, and this type include a corresponding converter box which is located at the mixing console. This converts the input signals back to analog to feed in the mixer. Others are intended for use with a digital mixer, and a cable can be connected directly from the stage box to the mixer, or through an Ethernet switch in some cases.

One of the main disadvantages of digital stage boxes, and digital audio systems in general, is their latency which is introduced in the analog-to-digital and digital-to-analog conversion processes. Latency is cumulative through all devices in the signal flow, so more complex networks, especially Ethernet-based ones, can experience latency significant enough to cause an audible delay. This was originally a major drawback of digital stage boxes, but recent systems have lowered latency to insignificant levels – typically 2–3 ms.

Common cables used for digital stage boxes are Cat 5e, Cat 6, Cat 7, and fiber-optic cable. The EtherCON locking connector is commonly used for twisted pair cables. Whilst these cables may be informally referred to as "ethernet", they do not necessarily use the Ethernet protocol, merely the same cables. Many manufacturers use proprietary standards for the transmission of digital audio, for example Behringer's ULTRANET, Digigram's EtherSound or Allen & Heath's dSNAKE. Open standards such as AES10 (used by DiGiCo, Soundcraft, Yamaha etc.) and AES50 (used by Midas, Behringer, Klark Teknik) also exist.

== Usage ==
In a live setting, all of the microphones and musical instruments on stage connect to the stage box, which then connects to the mixing console with a single cable. This is usually more practical than running many individual cables between the stage and the mixer, especially for touring systems. Stage boxes are sometimes also used to connect speakers to a mixer – either foldbacks or front-of-house speakers. Some sound engineers connect wireless microphone receivers to the stage box and position them in the same rack next to the stage.

In recording studios, stage boxes are used to connect the control room and the live room. They are commonly rack-mounted or mounted on walls in studios, in contrast to the portable method of installation used for live sound.

== Drop boxes ==
Smaller stage boxes (typically with 2 or 4 connectors) with shorter multicore cables are called drop boxes. These are typically used to carry microphone signals from one side of the stage to the other, or as an extension cable for a few channels on a larger stage box. The multicore cable attached to a drop box is often called a subsnake, although this may also refer to the entire assembly of drop box and multicore cable.
