= Multicore cable =

Combines multiple signals into a single jacketed cable

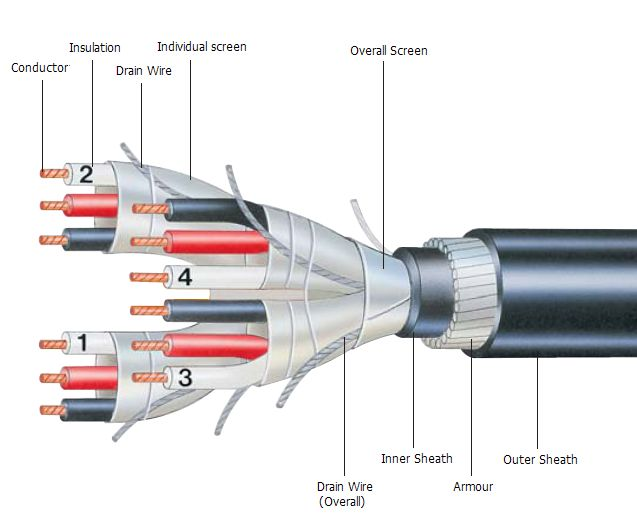
Cutaway diagram of a shielded multicore cable with four cores each with three individual conductors

A multicore cable is a type of electrical cable that combines multiple signals or power feeds into a single jacketed cable. The term is normally only used in relation to a cable that has more cores than commonly encountered. Not all cables with multiple insulated conductors are called multicore cables – the core in multicore refers to the number of usable connections made, not the number of conductors or wires. In most cases, a "usable connection" requires multiple conductors, such as the positive and negative conductors used for DC power.

For example, a standard three-conductor mains cable is never referred to as multicore, but a cable comprising four coaxial cables in a single sheath would be considered multicore. Confusingly, the term multicore is occasionally used to refer to the number of individual conductors rather than the number of connections, especially in Europe. A cable with multiple conductors, but not a multicore cable, is usually called a multi-conductor or multi-wire cable.

== Construction ==
By definition, multicore cables have an outer sheath which surrounds all of the inner conductors. This is usually in the form of an extruded PVC or cross-linked polyethylene jacket, often combined with an aluminium sheath under the surface for electromagnetic shielding. In many applications, this jacket adds significant mechanical protection, making the cable much more rugged. Sometimes each individual connection or channel also has its own jacket to aid mechanical or electromagnetic protection.

Some multicore cables terminate in a multipin connector, often circular. Others split the cores into separate cables at the ends, terminating in a mass of connectors. This type of end is often called a fan or tail.

== Applications ==
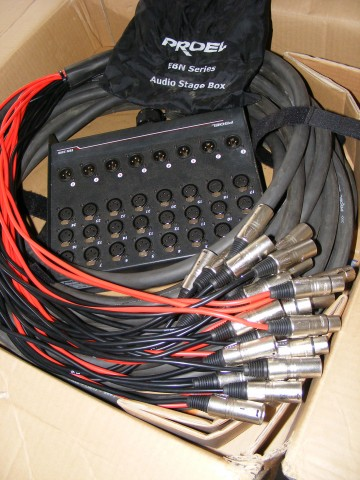
An audio multicore cable and accompanying stage box

Multicore cables can be used for analog and digital signals as well as power distribution. They are often used to simplify the physical setup of a system and provide a neater connection between two pieces of equipment. For example, in sound reinforcement, a multicore cable is often used to connect all the microphones on stage to the mixing console. This is much easier than running many individual cables, which can become messy and time consuming.

Some multicore cables combine different types of connections, such as a siamese cable which typically consists of power and coaxial conductors. This type of multicore is often advantageous in home wiring as it minimizes the number of cables run through the subfloor or ceiling cavity of a building.

Some common applications of multicore cables are:

- In audio engineering multicore cables are often called snake cables, and are used to transmit analog audio signals between equipment.
- Multicore cables are used with professional video cameras. In television studios, 26-pin cables are used to connect cameras to camera control units.
- In computer networking, multi-pair unshielded twisted pair cables are available, which contain more than four pairs (the number of pairs in a normal Ethernet cable). These cables are also called backbone, bundled, or feeder cables.
- Coaxial cables are often joined with power cables for CCTV use, meaning that only one cable has to be run to provide a both video and power connections.
- Twisted pair cables such as Ethernet cables are sometimes combined with fiber-optic cables. A common configuration is a four-pair Category 5 cable with two strands of multimode fiber optic cable.
- The Xbox 360 used a "hybrid cable" to connect the console to either composite or component video inputs.

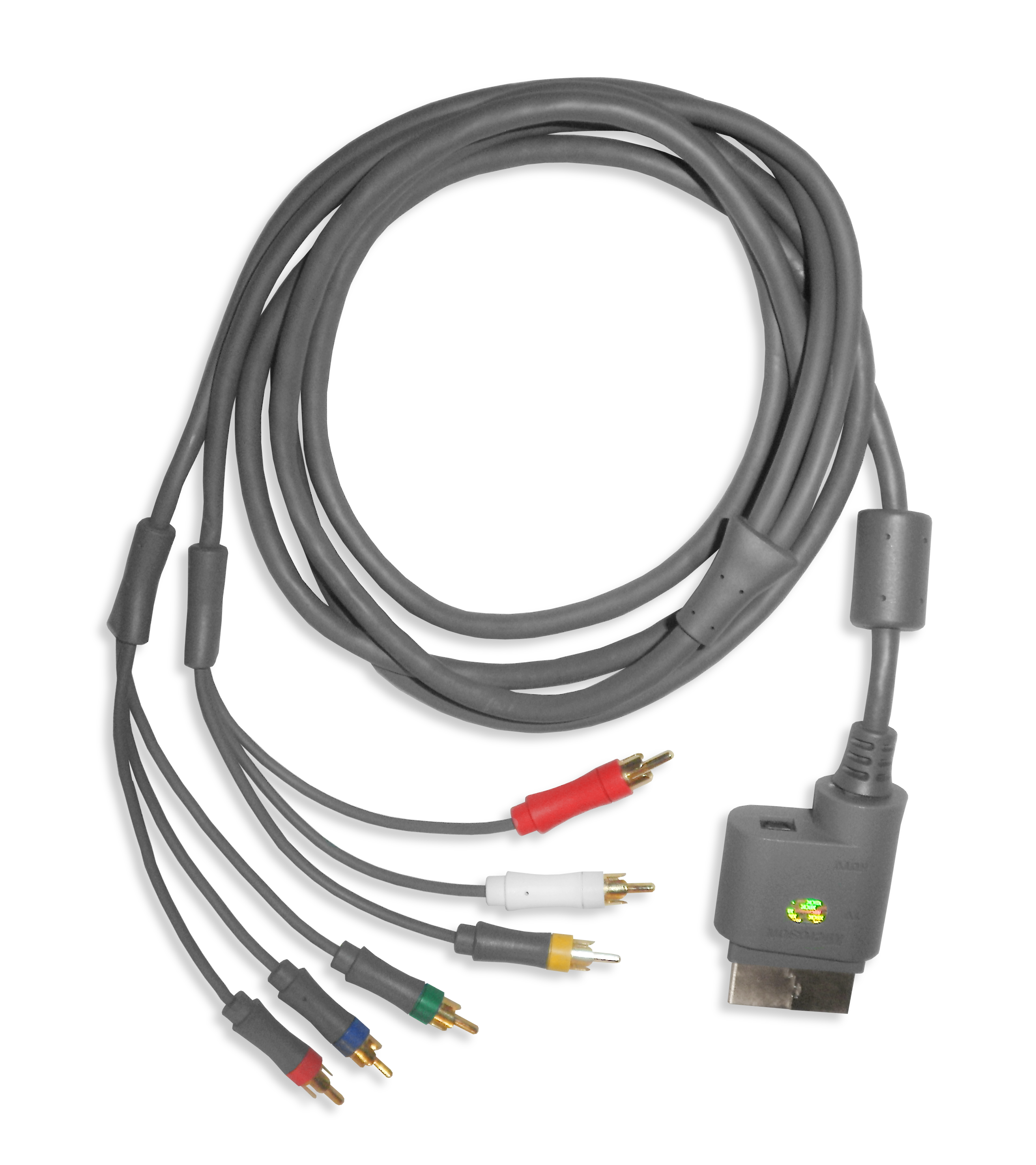
The "hybrid cable" used for the Xbox 360 carries composite, component and audio signals

== See also ==
- Audio multicore cable
- Cable harness
- Electrical connector
