= Audio signal flow =

Path an audio signal takes from source to output

Audio signal flow is the path an audio signal takes from source to output. The concept of audio signal flow is closely related to the concept of audio gain staging; each component in the signal flow can be thought of as a gain stage.

In typical home stereo systems, the signal flow is usually short and simple, with only a few components. However, in recording studios and performance venues, the signal flow can often be quite complicated, with a large number of components, each of which may cause the signal to fail to reach its desired output. Knowing each component in the signal flow becomes increasingly difficult and important as system size and complexity increases.

== Feedback ==
Feedback, also called "Howl-Round," occurs when the output of a device is accidentally connected to its input. If the device is amplifying the signal, then the amplified output will be fed back into the input, where it will be amplified again and sent to the output, where it will return to the input, be amplified again, and sent to the output, ad infinitum. An understanding of signal flow is important in preventing feedback.

== CD playback example ==
The following example will trace the signal flow of a typical home stereo system while playing back an audio CD.

The first component in the signal flow is the CD player, which produces the signal. The output of the CD player is connected to an input on a receiver. In a typical home stereo system, this connection will be analog and unbalanced at consumer line-level of -10dBV using RCA connectors. By selecting the proper input on the receiver, the signal is routed internally to an amplifier which boosts the signal voltage from line-level to the voltage required by the speakers. The output of the amplifier is then connected to speakers, which convert the electrical signal into acoustical sound.

== Single vocalist recording signal flow example ==
The exact series of elements in a signal flow will vary from system to system. The following example depicts a typical signal flow for recording a vocalist in a recording studio.

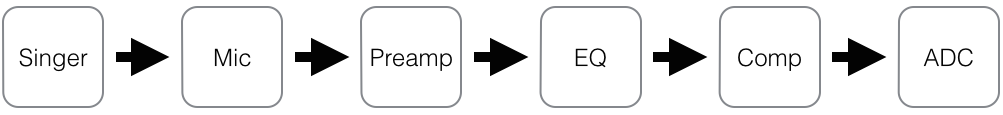
Singer Signal Flow Example

The first element in the signal flow is the vocalist, which produces the signal. This signal propagates acoustically to the microphone according to the Inverse-square law, where it is converted by a transducer into an electrical signal. Other objects may also produce sound in the acoustical environment, such as HVAC systems, computer fans, traffic noise, elevators, plumbing, etc. These noise sources can also be picked up by the microphone. It is therefore important to optimize the acoustical signal/noise ratio at the microphone. This can be accomplished by reducing the amplitude of unwanted noise (for example, turning off the HVAC system while recording), or by taking advantage of the inverse-square law; by moving the microphone closer to the signal source and farther away from any noise sources, the signal/noise ratio is increased.

After the microphone, the signal passes down a cable to the microphone preamplifier, which amplifies the microphone signal to line level. This is important because a line-level signal is necessary to drive the input circuitry of any further processing equipment down the chain, which will generally not be able to accept the extremely low-voltage signal produced by a typical microphone.

For the purposes of this example, the output of the microphone preamplifier is then sent to an EQ, where the timbre of the sound may be manipulated for artistic or technical purposes. Examples of artistic purposes include making the singer sound "brighter," "darker," "more forward," "less nasal," etc. Examples of technical purposes include reducing unwanted low-frequency rumble from HVAC systems, compensating for high-frequency loss caused by distant microphone placement, etc.

The output of the EQ will then be sent to a compressor, which is a device that manipulates the dynamic range of a signal for either artistic or technical reasons.

The output of the compressor is then sent to an analog-to-digital converter, which converts the signal to a digital format, allowing the signal to be sent to a digital recording device, such as a computer.

== Vocalist live sound signal flow example ==
The following example traces the signal flow of a vocalist performing in a church.

The signal flow begins as in the previous example; singer, microphone, microphone preamplifier, EQ, and compressor. For this example, this signal then flows into a mixing board, which allows the signal to be routed to various outputs. The mixing board includes facilities for a main mix bus, which we will send to the house sound system, a monitor mix bus, which we will use to create a monitor mix for the singer, and an auxiliary mix bus, which we will use to create a second mix to be sent to the lobby and nursery.

== Band signal flow example ==
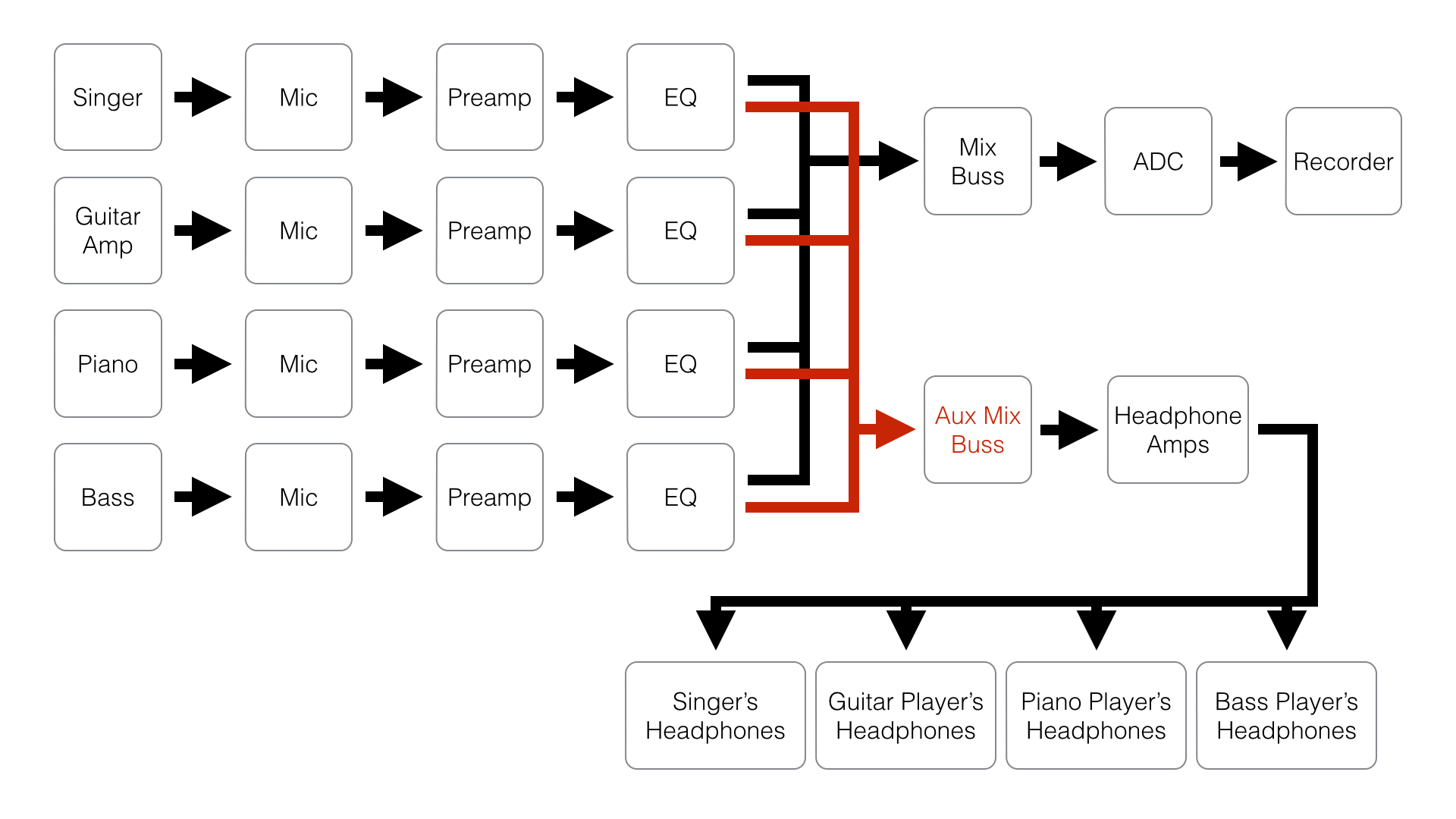
A diagram of a typical signal flow for a band

== Broadcast performance signal flow example ==
In this example, we will explore the signal flow of a hypothetical rock concert. For our example, this concert not only has a live audience, it is also being broadcast on live TV, and it is being recorded, with copies of the recording being sold to the public immediately after the concert is over. The signal from each microphone is therefore being sent to five places; the house sound system, the in-ear monitor system for the performers, the broadcast system, the recording system, and to the lobby, restrooms, and backstage areas so that people can hear the performance while outside the performance area.

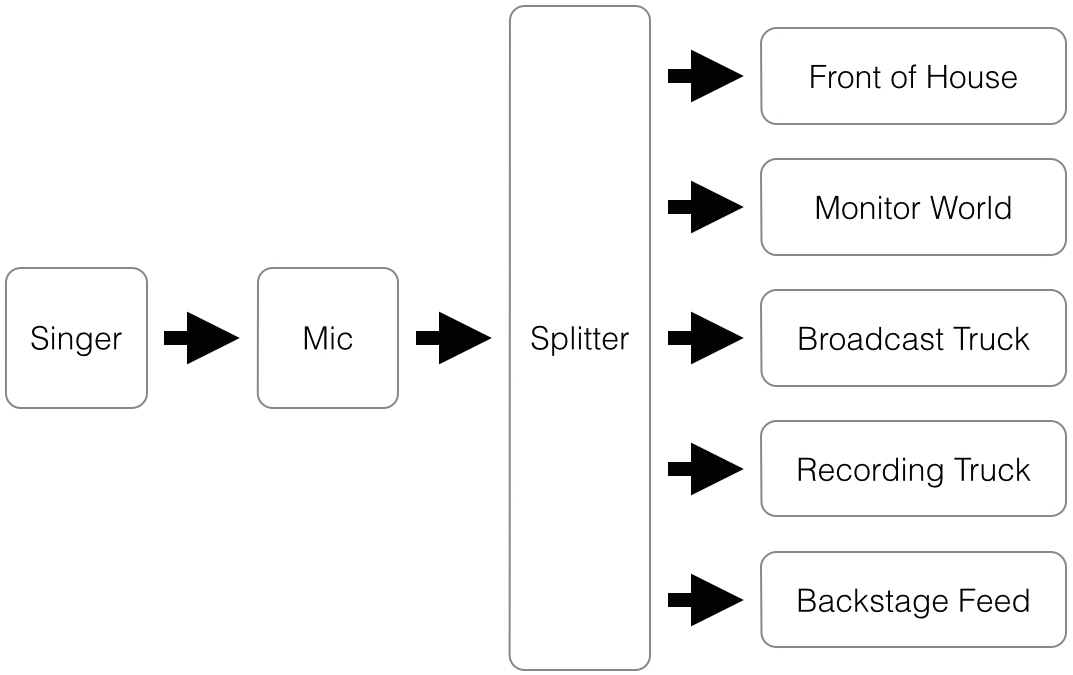
Overview diagram of Signal Flow for this example.

The house sound system will be controlled from the "Front of House" position, also called the "Mix position." This position is usually located behind the audience.

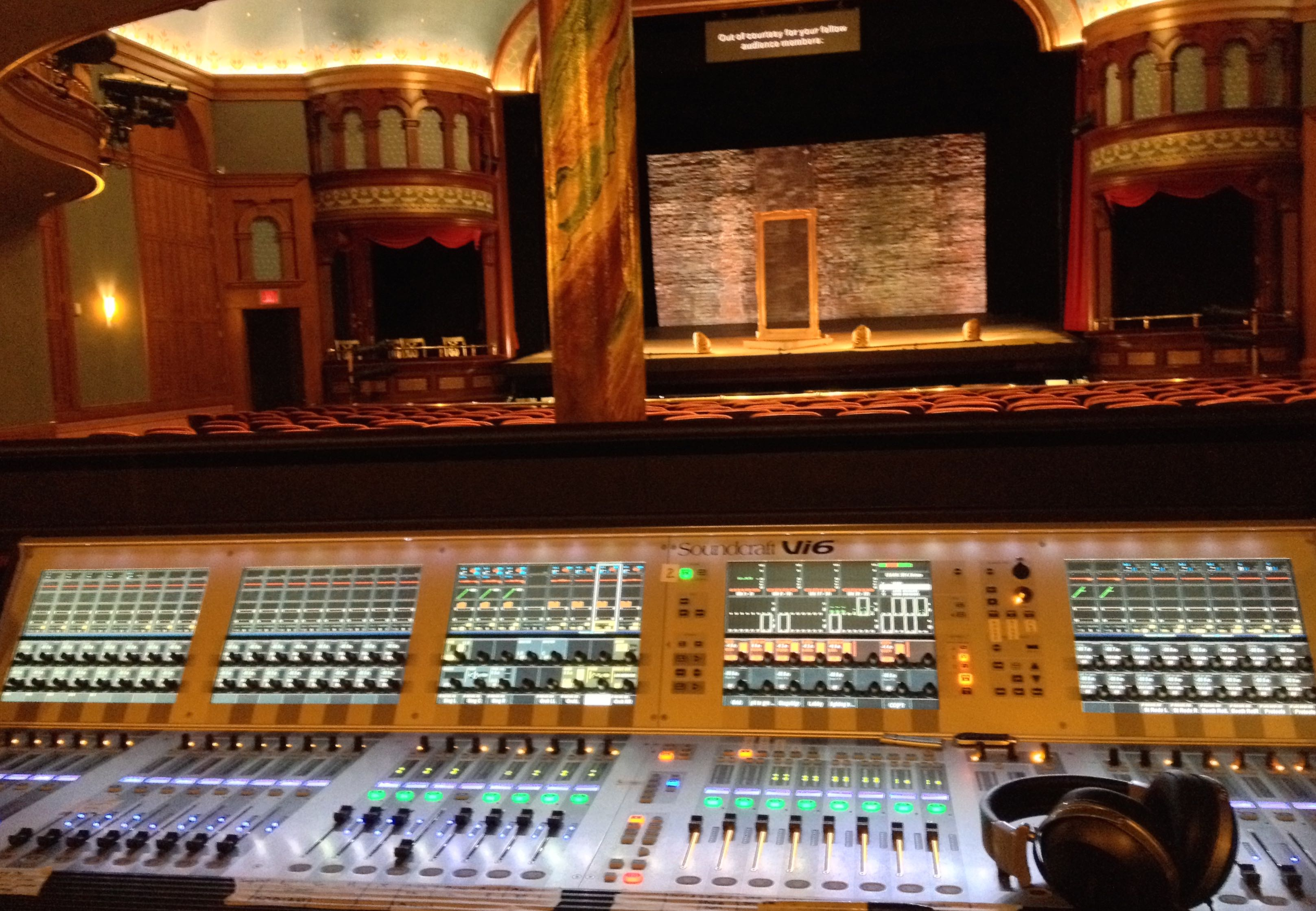
The view from the Front of House Position.

The in-ear monitor system will be controlled by a monitor mix engineer located in the wing on one side of the stage. It is necessary that the monitor mix engineer be able to communicate with the performers, so being in close proximity to them is essential. The monitor mix position is often called "monitor world."

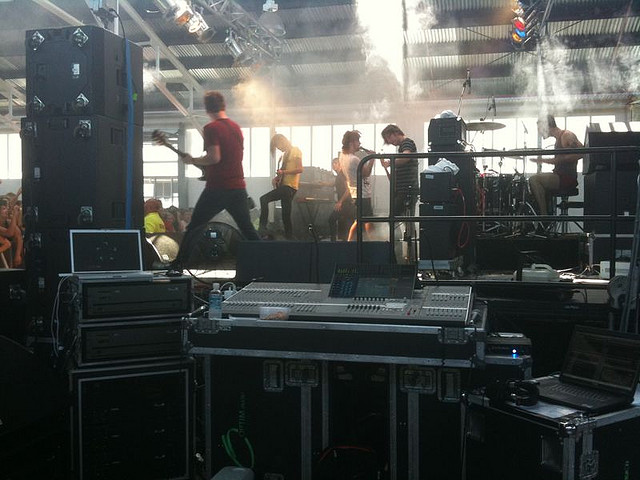
An example of a monitor mix position

The broadcast mix will be controlled from a broadcast truck, located in the parking lot behind the performance venue.

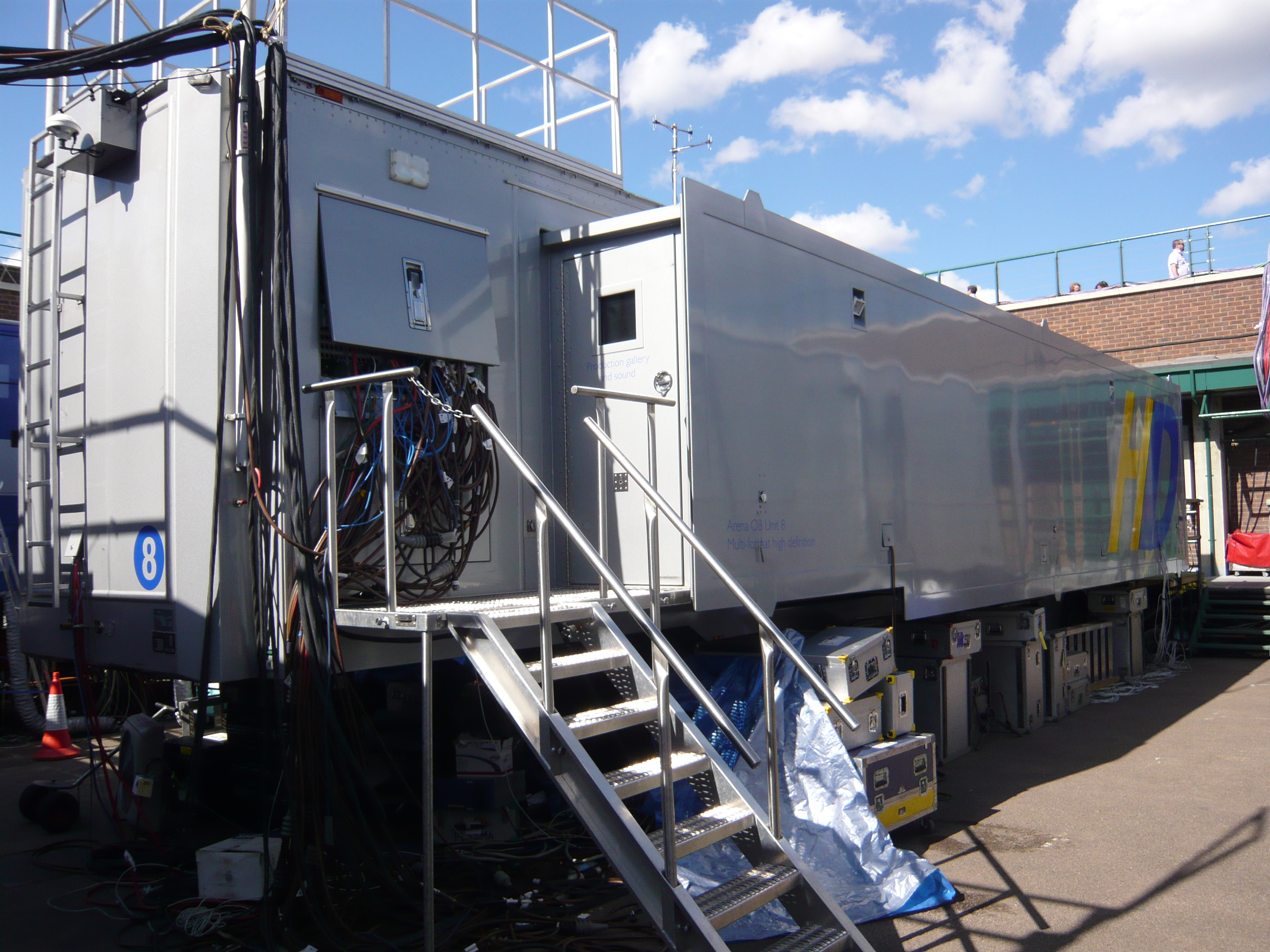
Arena Television OB8 working for the BBC at Wimbledon Tennis Championships, UK

The recording system will be located in another truck, located next to the broadcast truck.

For this example, the lobby, restroom, and backstage mix will be controlled by an assistant stage manager from backstage.

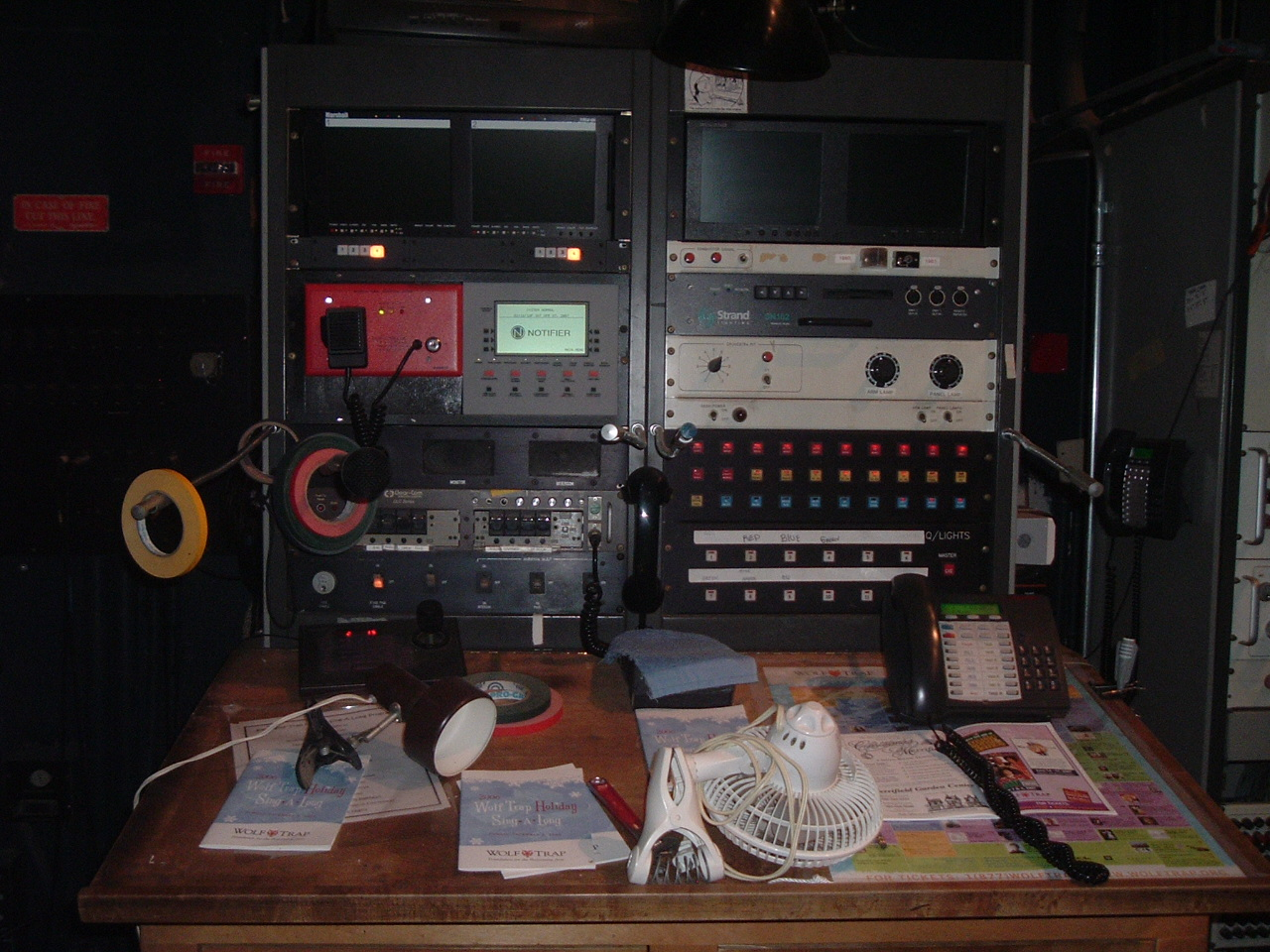
Stage managers panel

To facilitate this 5-way split, a device called a microphone splitter will be used. The microphone splitter serves several purposes; it will split the signal 5-ways, provide phantom power for condenser microphones and active DI boxes, and it will provide isolation between the 5 outputs, preventing ground loops. Preventing ground loops is an extremely important function, as the severity of ground loops typically increases with distance. In a large network of interconnected sound systems, such as the one in this example, ground loops could become dangerously severe. Isolation to prevent ground loops is therefore vitally important.

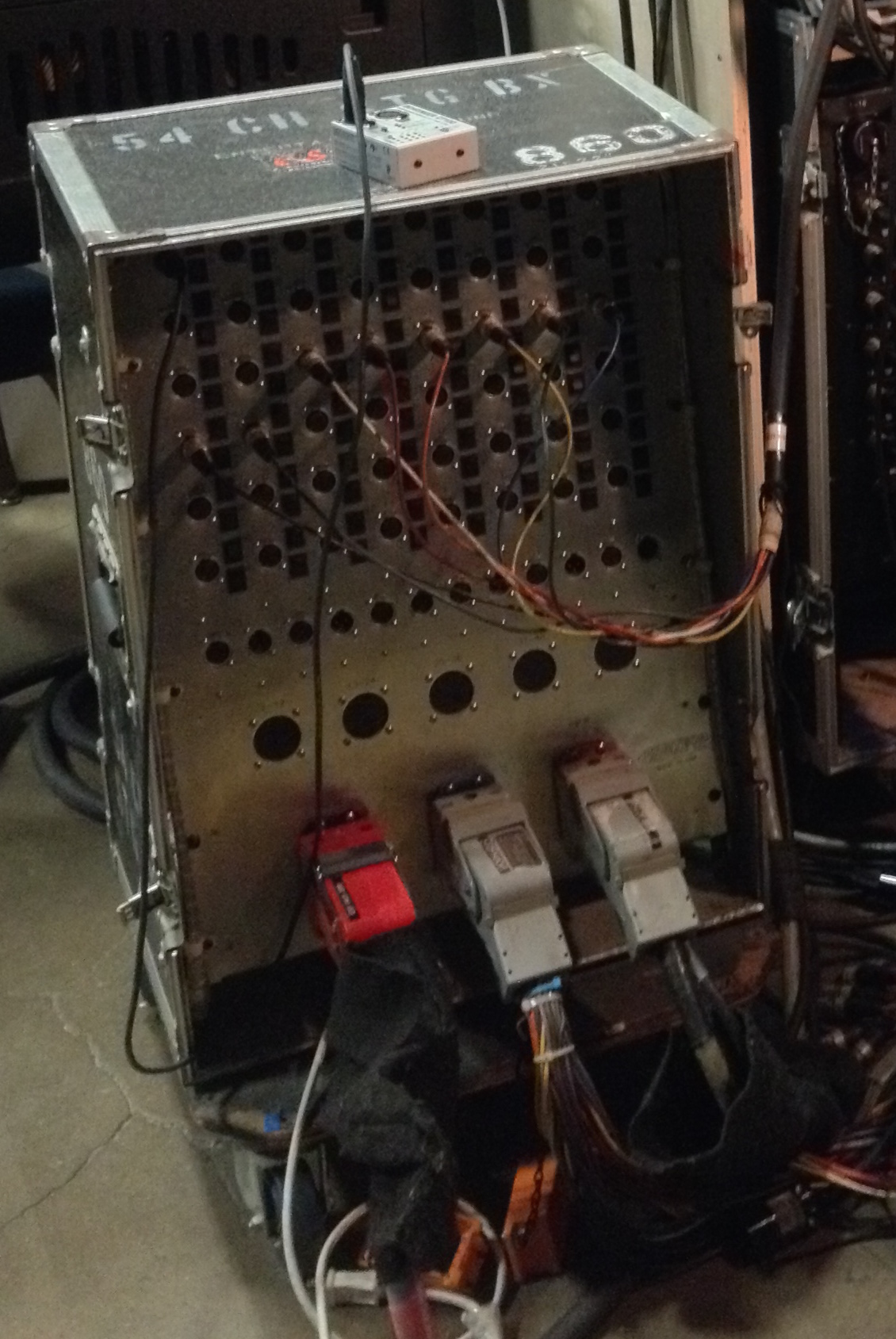
An example of a microphone splitter

Let's begin by tracing the signal path from the splitter to the audience. The signal leaves the splitter, typically via an Audio multicore cable, and travels to the Front of House position. Here, the still-mic-level signal enters into a microphone preamplifier, which boosts the signal voltage to line level. For this example, the microphone preamplifier is built into a mixing board. It is typical for a mixing board to include a line trim after the preamplifier. This allows the amplitude of the now line-level signal to be adjusted. This may be done for artistic or technical reasons. A typical application for the line trim is attenuating signals that were intentionally amplified too much by the microphone preamplifier. Over amplifying the signal can cause the preamplifier to distort, which can under certain circumstances produce a desirable sound.

After the line trim, the signal is processed by the mixing board's EQ, filter, compressor, limiter, de-esser, delay, reverb, and any other signal processing features the mixing board has available and that the mix engineer chooses to use. The processed signal is then sent to the mix bus, where it is combined with all the other signals coming from the stage. The balance of signals is controlled by faders.

The mix is then routed to one of the mixing boards outputs, and flows into a loudspeaker controller. This device processes the signal to optimize it for the sound system installed in the performance venue. It then flows into a rack of amplifiers, and then to the speakers.
