= Amphenol =

American manufacturer of electrical connectors

Amphenol Corporation
- Type: Public
- Traded as: NYSE: APH (Class A); S&P 500 component
- Industry: Electronics
- Founded: 1932; 94 years ago
- Founder: Arthur J Schmitt
- Headquarters: Wallingford, Connecticut, United States
- Key people: R. Adam Norwitt, President and CEO; Craig A. Lampo, CFO
- Products: Coaxial cables; Connectors
- Revenue: ▲US$23.094 billion (2025)
- Operating income: ▲US$5.868 billion (2025)
- Net income: ▲US$4.270 billion (2025)
- Total assets: ▲US$36.236 billion (2025)
- Total equity: ▲US$13.500 billion (2025)
- Number of employees: c. 170,000 (2025)
- Website: amphenol.com

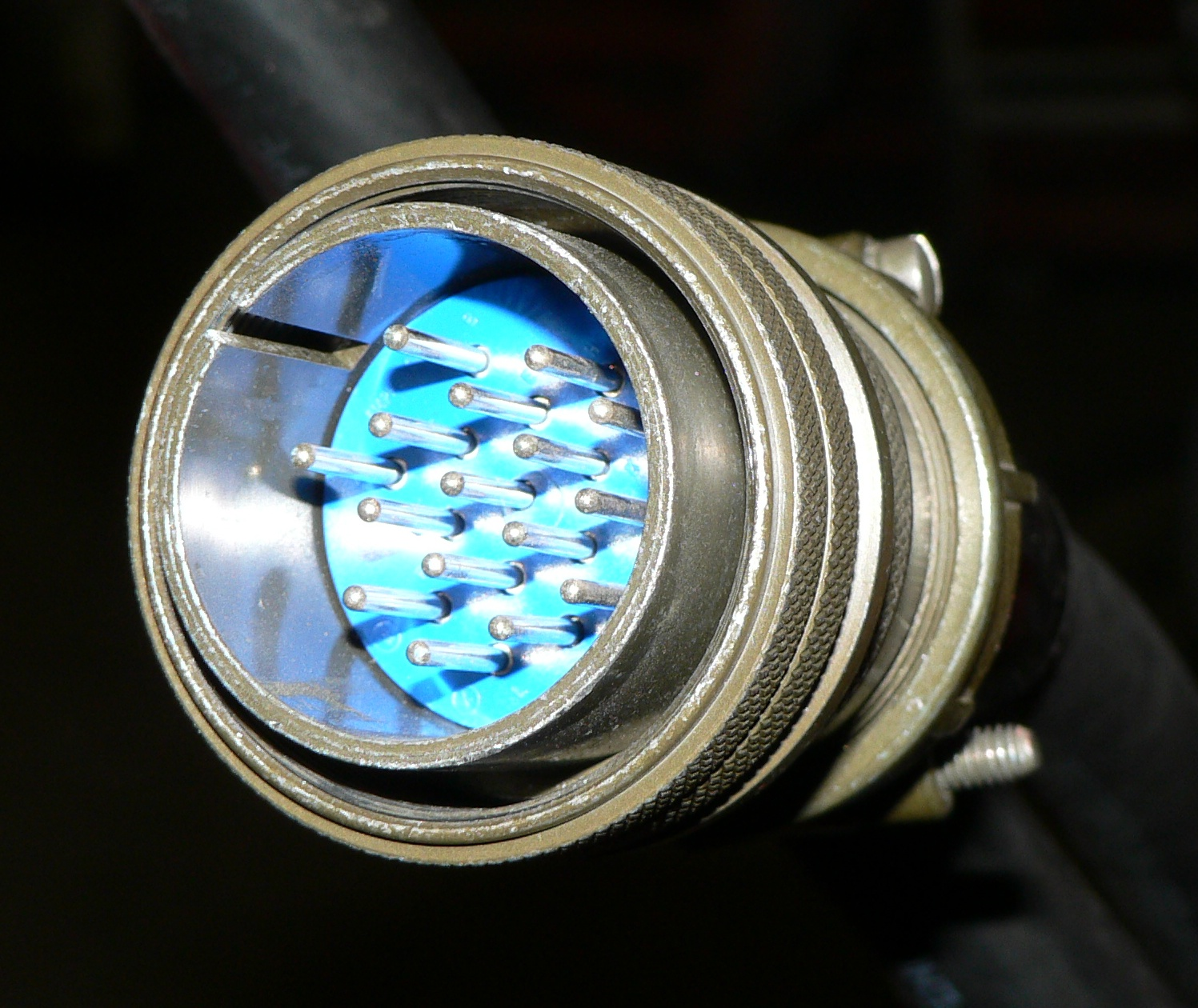
16-pin male MIL-DTL-5015 connector manufactured by Amphenol

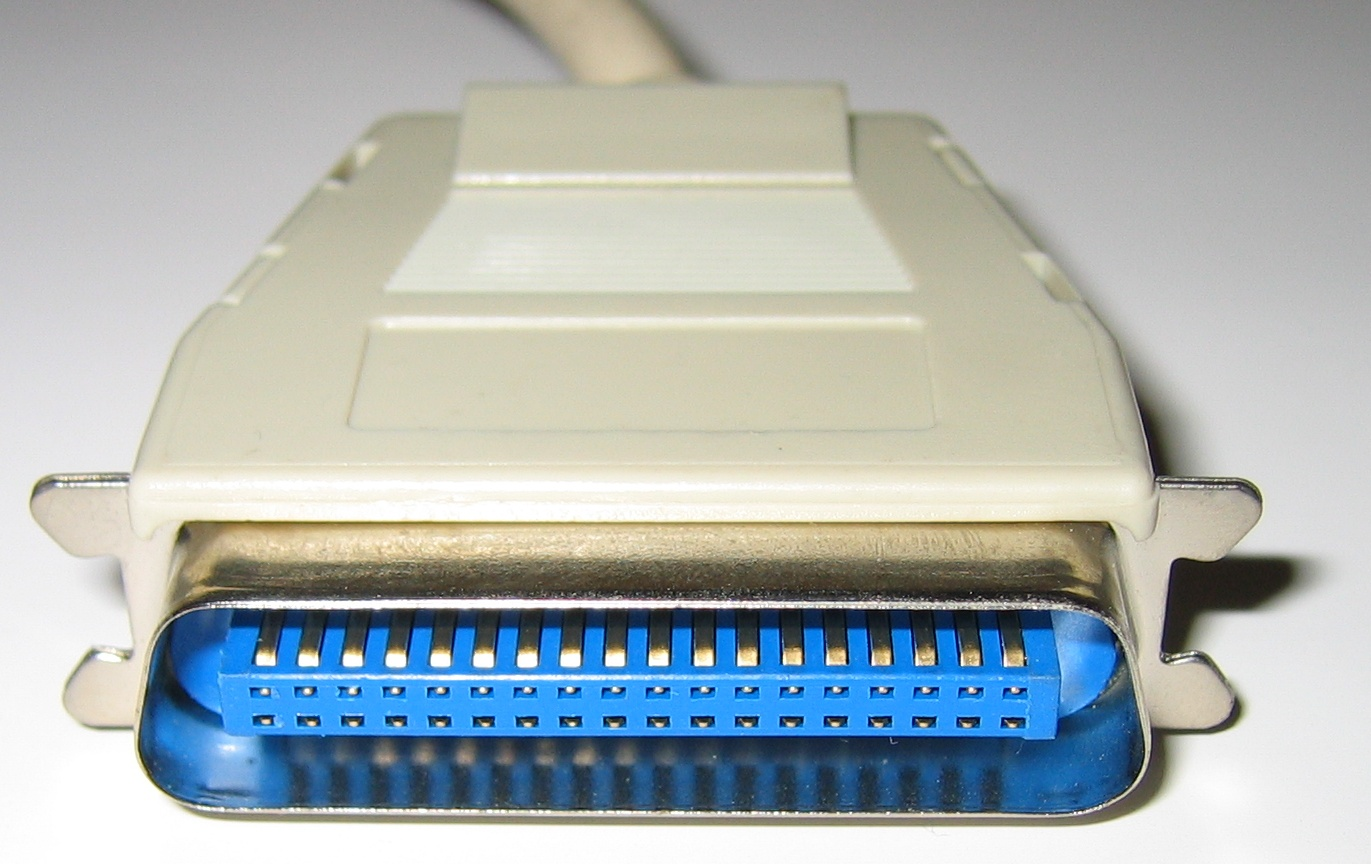
36-pin micro ribbon connector (micro ribbon was an Amphenol invention though this sample may not have been manufactured by Amphenol)

Wordmark during its ownership under Bunker Ramo

Amphenol Corporation, headquartered in Wallingford, Connecticut, is one of the largest designers, manufacturers and marketers of electrical, electronic and fiber optic connectors and interconnect systems, antennas, sensors and sensor-based products and coaxial, high-speed, fiber optic, and specialty cable.

The company's products are used for data centers and information technology (36% of 2025 revenues), industry (19% of 2025 revenues), automobiles (15% of 2025 revenues), communications networks (10% of 2025 revenues), defense (9% of 2025 revenues), mobile devices (6% of 2025 revenues), and aerospace (5% of 2025 revenues). The company name is a portmanteau of its predecessor, American Phenolic Corporation. The company is ranked the 198th on the Fortune 500 and 308th on the Forbes Global 2000.

== History ==
Amphenol was founded as American Phenolic Corporation Chicago in 1932 by Arthur J. Schmitt, whose first product was a tube socket for radio tubes (valveholder bases). In 1942, the company was renamed Amphenol Electronics Corporation. Amphenol expanded significantly during World War II, when the company became the primary manufacturer of connectors used in military hardware, including airplanes and radios.

In 1951, Amphenol engineers, including Paul Neill and Carl Concelman, developed the BNC connector, which became a standard in radio frequency applications. In 1957, the company became a public company via an initial public offering. That year, the company acquired Gas Purification and Chemical Company. In 1958, the company acquired George W. Borg Corp. and was renamed Amphenol-Borg Electronics Corp.

In May 1961, the company acquired FXR, Inc. In 1967, Bunker Ramo acquired the company and Amphenol operated as a subsidiary. In 1981, Allied Corporation acquired Bunker-Ramo for $358 million, including the Amphenol division. In 1983, Allied Corporation acquired Bendix Corporation and merged it into Amphenol. In 1984, the company opened a factory in Nogales, Sonora, Mexico. In 1986, Amphenol acquired Socapex for FF340 million, including FF120 million in new investment in the company. In 1987, in a leveraged buyout, LPL Investment acquired Amphenol for $430 million in cash. Sales declined during the early 1990s recession.

In 1991, the company once again became a public company via an initial public offering. In 1992, LPL acquired and merged Times Fiber Communications, a major manufacturer of coaxial cable and related products, into Amphenol. In 1993, Amphenol Fiber Systems was founded. In October 1995, the company had a one-week strike action organized by the International Association of Machinists and Aerospace Workers affecting 1,000 workers at its factory in Sidney, New York.

In 2001, the company bought the aerospace and defense connector business of Teradyne. Amphenol Cables on Demand was launched in 2006. In May 2005, Amphenol acquired SV Microwave. In October 2005, Amphenol acquired the connector business of Teradyne for $390 million. In February 2008, Amphenol acquired Sefee. In February 2009, the company acquired Jaybeam Wireless.

In November 2013, Amphenol acquired the Advanced Sensors Business of General Electric for $318 million. In January 2014, Amphenol acquired Tecvox OEM Solutions LLC. In January 2016, Amphenol acquired FCI Asia from affiliates of Bain Capital for $1.275 billion. In July 2016, Amphenol acquired AUXELFTG (AUXEL).

In January 2017, Amphenol acquired Phitek, which supplies noise cancellation and audio enhancement equipment such as aircraft in-flight entertainment interconnect products for the commercial aerospace industry, for $60 million. In June 2017, Amphenol acquired Meggitt, Wilcoxon, Piezo Technologies, and Piher Sensors and Controls from Meggitt PLC for £82 million. In September 2019, Amphenol acquired XGiga Communication Technology, which designs and manufactures active fiber optic interconnect components and optical transceivers for data centers and communications infrastructure markets.

In January 2020, Amphenol acquired Exa Thermometrics, an NTC thermistor based sensing solutions company based in Bangalore, India. In April 2021, Amphenol acquired MTS Systems Corporation for $1.7 billion. In December 2021, Amphenol acquired Halo Technology Group and its subsidiary Skylane Optics, for $715 million. In January 2024, Amphenol acquired TPC Wire & Cable for an undisclosed amount, expanding its specialty cable offerings with ruggedized designs for harsh environments like automotive manufacturing, shipyards, steel mills, and utility providers. This acquisition also brought custom-designed cable storage and deployment trailer offerings into their product portfolio. In May 2024, Amphenol acquired Carlisle Interconnect Technology from Carlisle Companies for $2 billion.

In February 2025, Amphenol acquired the Outdoor Wireless Networks and Distributed Antenna Systems businesses of CommScope, including its subsidiary Andrew Corporation, for $2.1 billion in cash. In January 2026, Amphenol acquired the connectivity and cable business unit of CommScope for $10.5 billion.
