= MIL-DTL-5015 =

U.S. Military Standard for electrical connectors

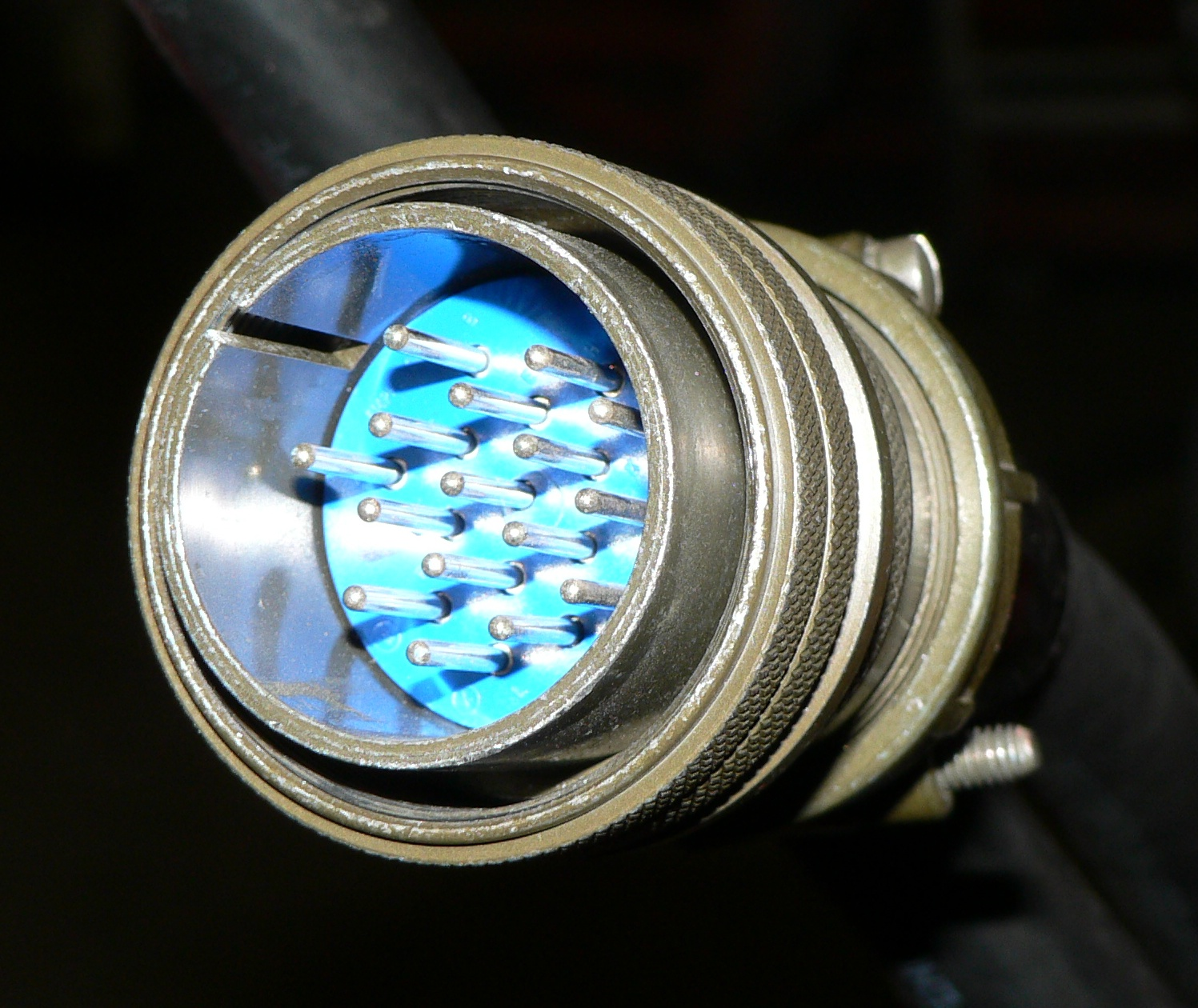
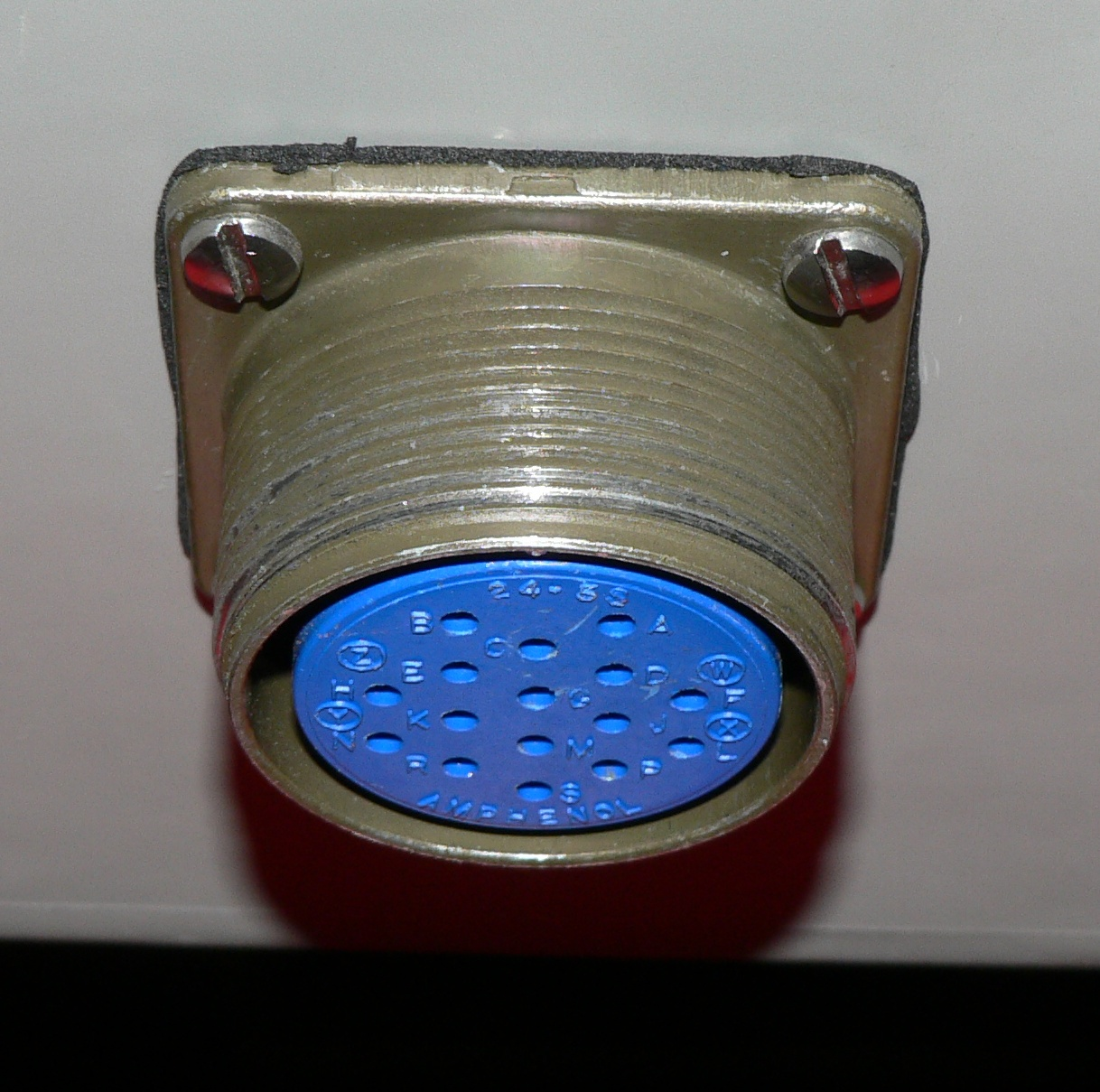
Male and female variants of a 16-pin MIL-DTL-5015 connector manufactured by Amphenol

MIL-DTL-5015 is a United States Military Standard which covers heavy-duty circular electrical connectors with soldered or crimped contacts. They are used for both digital and analog signals, as well as power distribution, and are common in various fields, including defense, aerospace, and industrial machinery. The connectors are particularly versatile and reliable, and due to their prevalence, relatively inexpensive.

Many manufacturers have created connectors based on MIL-DTL-5015 and MIL-C-5015, for example Radiall-Van System. These connectors are available as off-the-shelf products for end users, as well as "mil-COTS" products for railway and military use.

== History ==
In the early 1930s, Cannon (now ITT Interconnect Solutions) was contracted by Douglas Aircraft Company to develop electrical circular connectors for use on the DC-1 and on the subsequent DC-2 and DC-3 aircraft platforms. This led to the release of the original AN9534 standard in 1939, which was the precursor to MIL-C-5015 (subsequently MIL-DTL-5015). During the late 1930s, Cannon's Type AN (Army-Navy) series set the standard for modern circular connectors, and eventually in 1949, MIL-C-5015 was specified. It was revised in 1958, 1971, and 1976. The final revision, released in March 1994, was MIL-C-5015G.

In May 2000, MIL-C-5015G was superseded by MIL-DTL-5015H, six years after its publication.

In December 2009, MIL-DTL-5015 was superseded by SAE-AS50151, pursuant to the general United States Department of Defense goal to reduce the number of military standards in favor of industry technical standards supported by standards organizations. Whilst the original military standard is no longer in use officially, the family of connectors continues to be called MIL-DTL-5015 or MIL-C-5015 by manufacturers and users.

== Applications ==
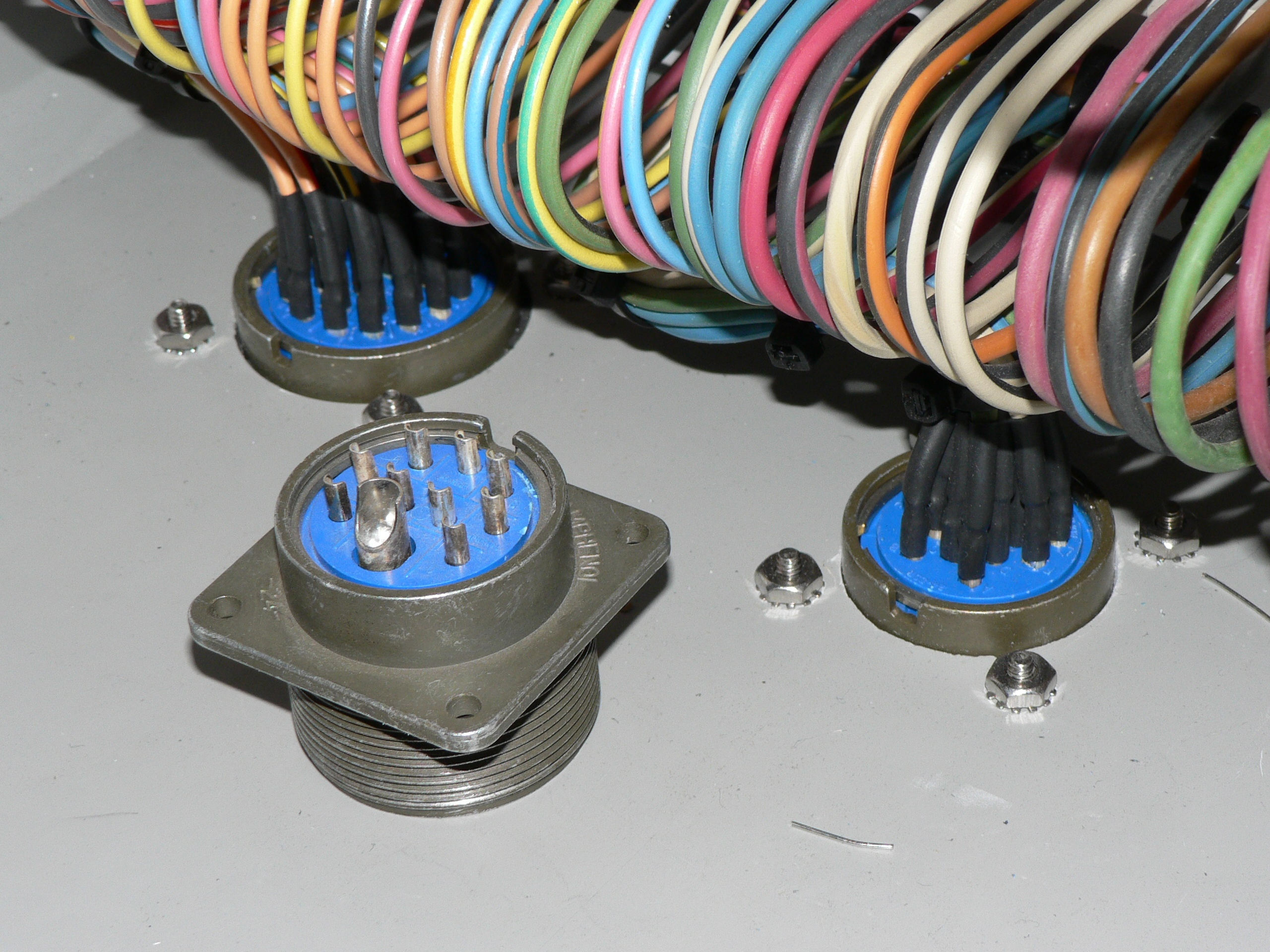
Rear solder contacts of MIL-DTL-5015 connectors, installed and uninstalled

MIL-DTL-5015 connectors are used for many situations where mechanical and electrical reliability is important. This includes civil applications (aerospace, oil and gas, salt water, petrochemical, mining, earthmoving, telecommunication, generators, machining tools, rail), as well as military applications (communications, aircraft, ground vehicles).

== Physical specifications ==
The main advantages of MIL-DTL-5015 connectors are as follows:

- Ease of engagement and disengagement
- Compatibility different types and numbers of contacts, allowing power and signal lines in one connector
- Wide range of allowable contact voltages and currents (up to 225 A for Series I)
- Rugged mechanical performance under harsh environmental conditions
- Variety of materials and finishes (stainless steel, aluminum, zinc)
- Wide temperature range of –55 °C up to 200 °C, depending upon the class of the connector
- Resistance to vibration and mechanical shock (anti-decoupling springs)
- Relatively low price
- Interlock and captive nut to prevent inadvertent disassembly
- Several shell styles (straight, right angle, wall receptacle, box receptacle, cable plug)

One significant drawback is the inefficient use of panel surface area when used in arrays, compared to rectangular connector housings. The fine thread is also prone to mechanical damage and can be time-consuming to tighten.

Another disadvantage to MIL-DTL-5015 connectors is that they have only one keyway, unlike some later connector specifications, such as MIL-DTL-38999. This limits the connectors' ability to be polarized to prevent mis-mating of same-shell-size connectors in an area where multiple sets of plugs and receptacles exist. Limited polarization is available in certain insert configurations, which relies on the pins bottoming out on the opposing connector face to prevent engagement. Connectors with multiple keyways can be polarized so that the shells prevent engagement of the pins on mis-mated connectors entirely.

There are 19 shell sizes (specified as size 08 through 40) with about 160 approved insert arrangements incorporating 1-85 contacts. The circular connectors are available with a choice of wall mount, box mount, cable connecting and jam-nut receptacles, as well as standard or self-locking plugs.

MIL-C-5015 specifies four discrete product categories known as series. Connectors from each of the first three series are compatible, however, their individual components differ:

Series	Category	Standard military PIN	Corresponding SAE standard
I	Solder contact connectors	MS3100	SAE-AS31001B
II	Front release, crimp contact connectors	MS3400	SAE-AS39029/44D
III	Rear release, crimp contact connectors	MS3450	SAE-AS39029/29C
IV	Connector accessories	(various)	SAE-AS85049/31B

It also refers to classes of connectors, which specify products in more detail:

Class	Crimp contacts	Solder contacts	Features
A	No	Yes	Solid shell
B	No	Yes	Split shell
C	No	Yes	For pressurized equipment
D	Yes	Yes	For high-impact conditions
DJ	Yes	Yes	For high-impact conditions; with backshell
E	No	Yes	Environment resistant
F	No	Yes	Environment resistant; with clamp
H	No	Yes	Hermetically sealed
K	Yes	Yes	For firewalls
L	Yes	No	Fluid resistant
P	Yes	No	Environment resistant; potted solder contacts
R	Yes	Yes	Grommet-sealed without clamp
U	Yes	No	Fluid resistant
W	Yes	No	General purpose

== Commercial products ==
Several manufacturers have created derivative circular connectors that intermate with the military versions designed to MIL-C-5015 and/or MIL-DTL-5015. Commercial variants and military-style connectors are sometimes called Type AN connectors, MS connectors, or Amphenol connectors.

Similar connectors with different contact arrangements and bayonet coupling rings are also available to military specifications. A wide range of MIL-DTL-5015 connectors are available on the market, with specifications and drawings commonly supplied.

In 1998, the AMP Incorporated brand-owned manufacturing plant was acquired by Amphenol and listed under the Amphenol-Aerospace Group. The plant continues to produce upgraded MIL-C-5015 connectors with crimp contacts with rear contact removal.
