= Plug-in box (stage lighting) =

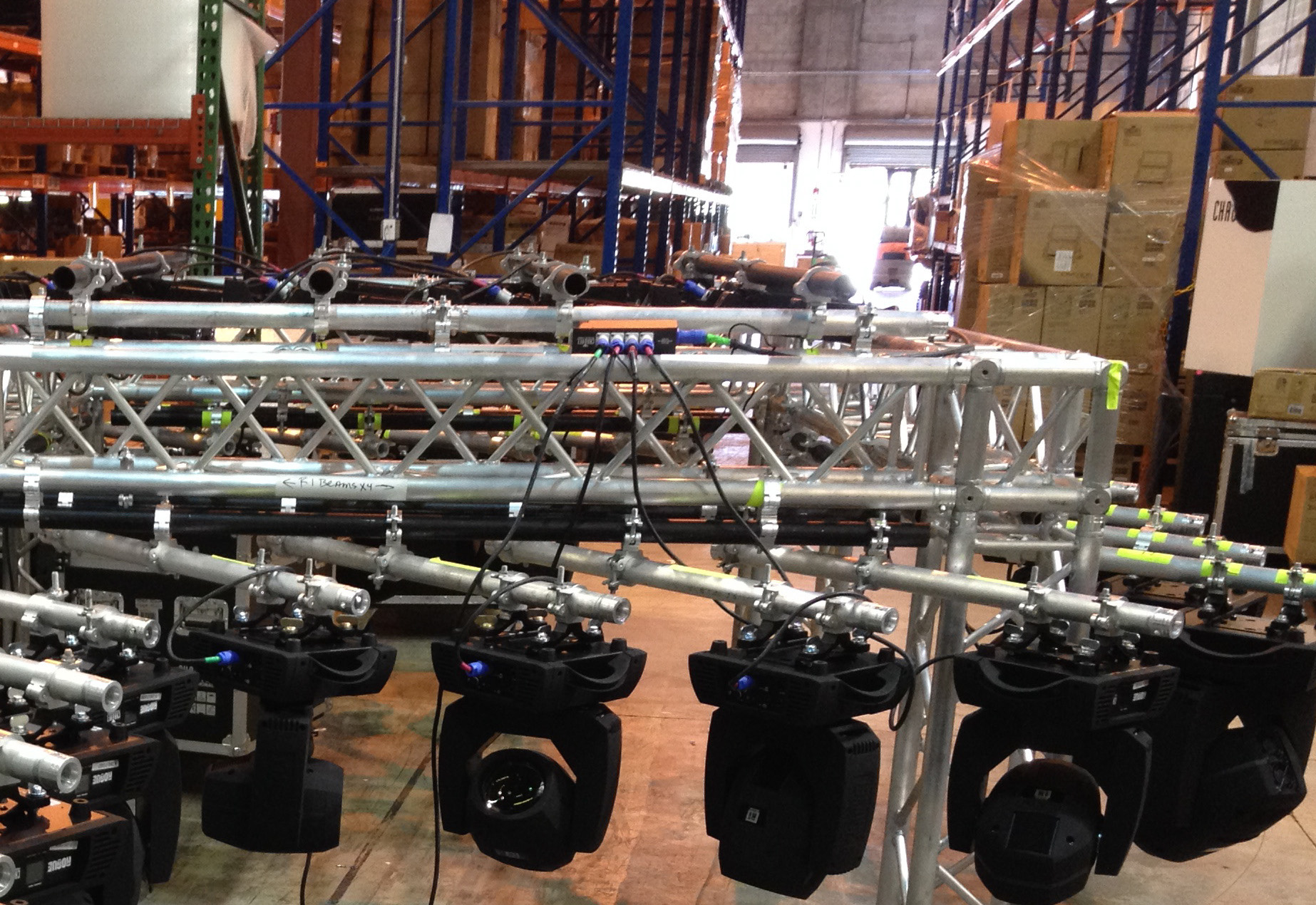
Moving heads connected to a plug-in box (center)

In stage lighting, a plug-in box, plug box or drop box is a device, similar to a power strip, to distribute power to multiple lighting instruments, consisting of an inlet (either detachable or hard-wired), and multiple female outlet connectors or pigtails. The electrical components are housed in or on a metal box which can be mounted to a floor, wall, or structure such as a lighting truss. Plug-in boxes often have multiple circuit breakers, and may be supplied power from a dimmer.
