= Jerry Harvey (inventor) =

American sound engineer (born 1961)

- Born: 1961 (age 64–65); St. Louis, Missouri, US
- Other names: Jerry J. Harvey, Jr.
- Employer: JH Audio
- Known for: founding Ultimate Ears and JH Audio, creating customized in-ear monitors
- Website: http://www.jhaudio.com/

Jerry Harvey (born 1961) is an American sound engineer best known for inventing, along with Karl Cartwright, a series of customized dual-speaker in-ear monitors in 1995. He founded Ultimate Ears that same year, and in 2007, founded JH Audio. He has served as the sound engineer for artists as varied as Van Halen, Kiss, Morrissey, the Cult, the Knack, David Lee Roth, Mötley Crüe, k.d. lang, and Linkin Park.

== Early life ==
Jerry Harvey was born in 1961 and raised in St. Louis, Missouri. His first break in the music business occurred in 1980, when the Gland Slam Superjam rock tour starring April Wine, Judas Priest, and Sammy Hagar performed at the St. Louis Busch Stadium. While Harvey was tinkering on his 1978 red Pontiac Trans Am, Hagar's people approached him on the street and asked to borrow his car in exchange for free tickets. They then used Harvey's car to drive on stage during Hagar's anthem "Trans Am (Highway Wonderland)."

The show's promoter gave Harvey a job as a gofer, which led to Harvey working as a roadie for the local band The Agents. He soon became the light, and ultimately, the sound guy for the band, even though he was still underage at most of their venues. Harvey soon began traveling the world mixing sound for performers such as Kiss, Morrissey and The Cult.

In 1986 Harvey met David Lee Roth at a bar, and soon began mixing sound for Roth, and then Van Halen, on tour. According to Inc. magazine, "From his perch on the left side of the stage behind a black drop, Harvey's job, essentially, was to make sure the band members liked what they heard (as opposed to the person behind the big board out in the crowd, who only has to please the drunken audience)."

== Ultimate Ears ==
=== Invention ===
In 1995, Alex Van Halen told Harvey during the band's rehearsals for their Balance tour that the noise on stage was too much. The massive volume from the stage monitors and speakers were damaging his ears and making it difficult for the band members to hear one another. Harvey began tinkering and looking for components to solve the problem; in Japan he found tiny electrical components, and in the United States he found a tiny speaker designed for a pacemaker. He created a tiny in-ear speaker system that connected to a small receiver on Alex's belt via thin cables. The receiver then picked up the wireless signal from Harvey's mixing board. The in-ear monitors had two small speakers to separate output volume into low and high frequencies for bass and treble, and they fit into shells that were impressions of Alex's ears. The in-ear monitors also blocked out ambient noise, and according to Alex Van Halen, "It was like night and day."

=== Founding ===
Sebastian Bach and other members of Skid Row, who were opening for Van Halen on tour, soon wanted their own monitors, and paid $3000 cash for six pairs. After his third client Engelbert Humperdinck requested one, Harvey decided to create the company Ultimate Ears, and word began spreading through the rock community. His former wife Mindy left her job working as a sales manager for an office equipment supplier in St. Louis to handle the new business, as Harvey himself had no interest in leaving his job as a touring sound mixer. That year the couple amicably separated, and they both separately moved to Las Vegas to run Ultimate Ears out of Mindy's house.

Harvey continued to tour, finishing up the Balance tour with Van Halen and then mixing for k.d. lang on the All You Can Eat tour and Mötley Crüe on their Generation Swine tour. He marketed Ultimate Ears while doing so, though he often had to convince artists that they wouldn't look like hearing aids on stage. A custom pair went for $700 to $900.

=== Westone ===
Ultimate Ears contracted Westone, a Colorado Springs manufacturer of custom-fit earpieces, to create the shell casings for the musicians' commissions. Westone also began assembling the monitors.

Profits jumped in 1998 when Harvey introduced the fifth-generation model the UE-5. By 2000, Ultimate Ears was becoming a fixture among rock artists, and Harvey's pieces were used by the Rolling Stones, Faith Hill, Enrique Iglesias, and the Red Hot Chili Peppers. Near the end of 2001 Ultimate Ears had added some 200 artists including Cirque du Soleil, the Late Show with David Letterman, and various megachurches.

In 2001, however, the relationship with Ultimate Ears and Westone began to fall apart. While on tour Harvey heard from sources that Westone was claiming ownership to his custom designs, as well as trying to set up a separate European distribution. An attorney informed Mindy that Westone owned all the trademarks and patents associated with Ultimate Ears, and that Harvey had no patent protection. Harvey decided to retake control of the business. However, while he had designed the interior circuitry of the monitors, he didn't know how to make the acrylic shells. Westone also had all the rock star ear impressions.

=== Expansion ===
Harvey decided to travel to Florida to research hearing aid manufacturing so they could create their own manufacturing lab. While at a two-week hearing aid course in Orlando, he befriended instructor Chomphorn "Noy" Soudaly, a hearing aid technician from Laos. He hired Noy at double his own salary to help create the lab he planned on setting up in Las Vegas. Noy and Harvey spent "100 days of hell" in research and development on a new upgrade to ship by April 4, 2002.

With Ultimate Ears again running, Harvey eventually settled with Westone out of court with the brand intact. Ultimate Ears had to recollect ear impressions from their long-term customers, and about 90% remained loyal to Harvey over Westone. By 2003 Ultimate Ears had five employees and about a million dollars in revenue, and the company estimated it had about 80% of the professional market. Noy handled the lab and Harvey continued to work on custom model design.

With the company stabilized, in 2003 Harvey went back on tour, this time mixing for Linkin Park. However, after a member of the band's production staff introduced Harvey to the iPod, he left the tour early to begin designing a less expensive version of Ultimate Ears. By January 2004 he debuted the UE-5c model at $550, which featured dual drivers tuned for digital devices. The model was a success and doubled company revenue.

In 2005 Harvey moved the company to Irvine, California. In order to secure outside capital to develop lower-cost custom earpieces, Harvey contacted Bob Allison of the investment holding company Innovate Partners. Allison convinced Harvey to create a Super.fi line of Ultimate Ears for the mass consumer market for $250, and helped them open a manufacturing operation in China. The Super.fi 5 Pro was released in April 2005, and by 2006 revenue was in excess of $10 million.

Allison became CEO of Ultimate Ears, with Mindy as president and Harvey as Chief Technical Officer. By June 2007 the company had 30 employees. After the launch of the UE-11 model, and in August 2007, Ultimate Ears was acquired by Logitech International for $34 million. Harvey left Ultimate Ears ten months prior to the acquisition.

== JH Audio ==
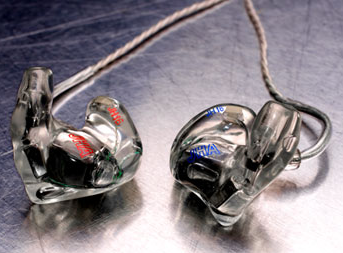
JH16 Pro in-ear monitor

In 2007 Harvey and his wife Brittany moved to Lake of the Ozarks, where they discovered their newborn daughter Katie had a rare genetic disease. They relocated to Harvey's hometown to be close to the local children's hospital, and then in 2008 to Orlando, in order to find trained hearing aid technicians to assist in manufacturing new products he had designed for aviators.

Harvey was not allowed to return immediately to the pro audio business because of a signed non-compete clause, and stated "I knew I couldn’t live on my old products, I had to come out and push the technology forward."

In late 2007 Harvey and his wife Brittany co-founded Jerry Harvey Audio LLC, or JH Audio, and began marketing and manufacturing custom aviation headsets. The company made $300,000 its first year of operation. By mid-2009, however, Harvey began supplementing the income by launching the JH Audio music line, including the JH13 Pro model, which features dual lows, mids, and highs joined by an integrated 3-way crossover. Previously Harvey's inventions were prone to reverse engineering by competitors, but Harvey has stated about his new models that "They can mimic them, but they can’t get the components. We’re the only ones who have access to them."

By May of that year he had 300 custom orders after an audio show in Los Angeles, and in ten days there was more than $250,000 worth of orders. The company, which is based in Apopka, Florida, had a revenue of $1 million in 2009. Though Harvey is a pilot, the aviation headset department was discontinued in January 2011. Harvey's wife, Brittany, was president and CEO in 2011. The company had 16 employees, and Harvey's daughter Jaime Harvey was chief operating officer.

Harvey continues to mix live concert sound about eight to twelve weeks a year, partly to beta test new models under real stage conditions. In January 2013, Steve Thomas was promoted from CFO to CEO of JH Audio.

Harvey divorced again, and at end of 2013 he became sole owner of JHAudio. Harvey hired veteran roadie and sales executive Andy Regan to serve as president in 2014. JHAudio launched a line of universal earphones for consumers.

In May 2025 JH Audio was acquired by Sound Devices, a subsidiary of Audiotonix.

== Personal life ==
Harvey's first marriage to Shelley Harvey produced a daughter, Jaime Harvey. He and Shelley divorced. Harvey married Melinda L. "Mindy" Harvey, who became his business partner with Ultimate Ears. Their divorce became final in June 1996. After meeting Brittany Gale at a David Lee Roth concert, Harvey married her in 2003; they had two children, Katie Harvey and Jerry Junior Harvey III. They divorced in 2013. Jerry married Amy Thomas in 2016. He divorced Amy in 2020.
