= Westone =

American audio equipment manufacturer

- Headquarters: Colorado Springs, Colorado, USA

Westone is an American manufacturer of custom earpieces for the hearing healthcare market, hearing protection products, custom communications earpieces, clinical and audiological supplies, musicians hearing protection and in-ear monitors for professional musicians and audiophiles.

== History ==
Westone Laboratories, Inc. was established in 1959 by Ron Morgan Sr. outside of Divide, Colorado, USA. The company was later headed by Ron Morgan's son, Randy Morgan. It is headquartered in Colorado Springs, Colorado and currently led by Dan McCoy, President and CEO.

Westone Music Products invented the first in-ear musicians' monitor. The company originally designed and manufactured the E1 and E5 for Shure, another manufacturer of audio equipment. Westone also co-developed and manufactured the early Ultimate Ears brand by Jerry Harvey, and custom-fitted in-ear musicians’ monitors.

Westone was purchased by HealthEdge Investment Partners in 2017. In 2020, Westone's music division, Westone Audio was purchased by Lucid Audio.

== Products ==
The company's earpieces are used for hearing healthcare, recreation, industrial and military applications. Its core business is custom earpieces for hearing healthcare (i.e., used in conjunction with hearing aids), but it also caters to the professional musician and audiophile market.

== Earphones and in-ear musicians' monitors ==
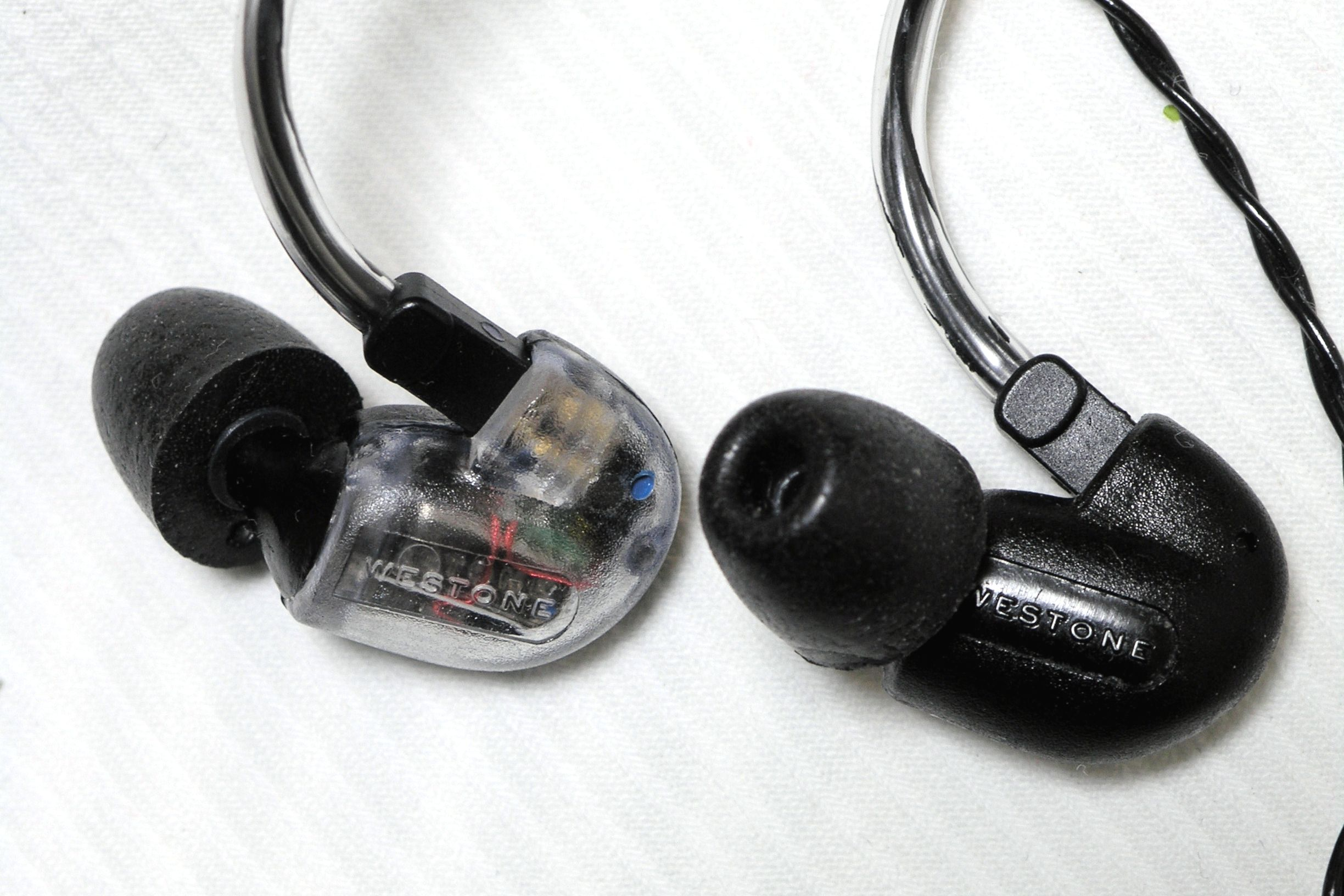
UM3X Removable Cable

Westone Audio manufactures both custom-fit and universal-fit products for personal listening for consumers, in-ear musicians’ monitors for professional musicians and audiophiles, as well as hearing protection for musicians and concert goers.

Westone Audio currently has five different product families of in-ear musicians’ monitors and earphones: the Universal Series (UM Pro 10, UM Pro 20, UM Pro 30, UM Pro 50) in-ear musicians’ monitors, the W Series (W10, W10, W30, W40, W50, W60) earphones for personal listening, the custom Elite Series (ES10, ES20, ES30, ES50, ES60), the custom Consumer Recreational (CR10), custom Musician's monitors (AC10 and AC20) and custom earpieces (Style #7 and UM56) for adapting to universal-fit earbuds and earphones.

The single driver UM Pro 10, dual driver UM Pro 20, triple driver UM Pro 30, and 5 driver UM Pro 50 are designed to provide frequency efficiencies using a universal-fit for on-stage monitoring. While the W10, W20, W30, W40, W50, and W60 also provide a universal-fit, they are specifically designed for the personal listener.

The Elite Series, namely the ES10, ES20, ES30, ES50, and ES60 are custom fit earphones and in-ear musicians’ monitors. This line was originally targeted to provide custom-fit in-ear musicians’ monitors for professional musicians for on-stage monitoring.

Custom fit is an upgrade in personal listening and in-ear musicians’ monitors. Custom-fit designs fit the shape of the ear and ear canal. Headphones typically are noise cancellation products, providing background noise in addition to the music/sound the headphone drivers deliver. Custom-fit products isolate external noise and sound by creating a seal, which aims to enhance the sound quality delivered, and to provide a better sound performance level than headphones and ear buds.

W Series	Driver
All W series monitors feature removable cables, and include 1 braided cable, and 1 Apple Certified Microphone Cable	-
W10	Balanced armature, full range, single driver.
W20	Dual balanced armatures, 1 low & 1 mid/high frequency.
W30	Three balanced armature drivers with a passive three-way crossover.
W40	Four balanced armature drivers with a passive three-way crossover (2 low, 1 mid, 1 high)
W50	Five balanced armature drivers with a passive three-way crossover (1 low, 2 mid, 2 high)
W60	Six balanced armature drivers with a passive three-way crossover (2 low, 2 mid, 2 high)
W80	Eight balanced armature drivers with a passive three-way crossover (2 low, 2 mid, 4 high)

Universal In-Ear Musicians’ Monitors	Driver
All UM Pro series monitors feature removable cables
UM Pro 10	Balanced armature, full range, single driver
UM Pro 20	Dual balanced armatures with a passive crossover;
UM Pro 30	Three balanced armature drivers with a passive three-way crossover
UM Pro 50	Five balanced armature drivers with a passive three-way crossover (1 low, 2 mid, 2 high)

Custom Monitors/Earphones	Driver
CR10	Balanced armature, full range, single driver
AC10	Balanced armature, full range, single driver
AC20	Dual balanced armatures with a passive crossover
ES10	Balanced armature, full range, single driver
ES20	Dual balanced armatures with a passive crossover
ES30	Three balanced armature drivers with a passive three-way crossover
ES50	Five balanced armature drivers with a passive three-way crossover (1 low, 2 mid, 2 high)
ES60	Six balanced armature drivers with a passive three-way crossover (2 low, 2 mid, 2 high)
ES80	Eight balanced armature drivers with a passive three-way crossover (2 low, 2 mid, 4 high)

Earpieces	Descriptions
Style 49	Typically considered hearing protection, this product is designed for the wearer to hear accurately, but at a safer volume. The design fits into the ear canal with a 9, 15, or 25 dB filter.
Style #7	Also known as Westone iCustoms[TM]. This product is designed for a custom-fit with standard earbuds.
UM 56	This product allows UM product line users to upgrade their universal-fit to a custom-fit. These earpieces are canal-style similar to the size of a universal tip.
