= SoundGrid =

Professional audio platform

SoundGrid is a networking and processing platform audio application made by Waves Audio and developed in cooperation with DiGiCo.

It consists of a Linux-based server that runs the SoundGrid environment, compatible plug-ins, a Mac or Windows control computer, and an audio interface for input/output (I/O). It provides a low-latency environment for audio processing on certain hardware audio mixing consoles, e.g., DiGiCo, Allen & Heath, and Yamaha.

== Audio ==
SoundGrid is a proprietary Ethernet Layer 2 protocol and EtherType. It routes audio between networked I/O devices and processes it on plugin servers connected to the same network. The I/O device converts SoundGrid packets to standard audio protocols. It splits output to record on a standard digital audio workstation (DAW).

Using native processing, SoundGrid runs on standard CPUs under a modified Linux operating system (OS). Waves Audio says this provides "predictability, stability, and low latency," previously exclusive to dedicated DSP-based systems.

Separate computers provide SoundGrid processing:

- One or more SoundGrid servers are dedicated to audio processing in a customized Linux OS optimized for audio processing.
- A Windows or Mac computer runs SoundGrid Host, the host application, and the user interface.

Audio interfaces with SoundGrid by integrating a SoundGrid-programmed FPGA (Xilinx Spartan 3) into a mixing console's I/O ports. The FPGA receives I2S or other audio signal formats and converts them to the SoundGrid format. The FPGA also transfers control external messages between control nodes.

== Control software ==
SoundGrid audio processing, system configuration, and monitoring are controlled by the SuperRack (previously MultiRack) SoundGrid control application, which runs on Windows and Mac computers, including embedded systems. SuperRack SoundGrid displays rows of virtual plugin chains, named Racks, each of which chains up to eight Waves plugins. A Rack processes audio from a user-selected input and sends the processed output to a user-selected output. SuperRack SoundGrid offers remote parameter control and navigation over MIDI or an inter-application API by integrating with the console's host application.

== Scalability ==
Users can configure SoundGrid systems and expand them by adding I/O or processing devices.

== See also ==
- Audio over Ethernet
