= DiGiCo =

British audio equipment manufacturer

- Company type: Subsidiary
- Industry: Professional audio
- Founded: 2002; 24 years ago, in the United Kingdom
- Founder: James Gordon
- Headquarters: Chessington, England
- Parent: Audiotonix
- Website: www.digico.biz

DiGiCo is a British company based in Chessington, England that designs, markets, and manufactures digital mixing consoles and other audio technologies for the live sound, musical theatre, broadcast, and installed sound markets. Originally founded from console manufacturer Soundtracs, DiGiCo is part of the Audiotonix Group.

== History ==
DiGiCo was founded in 2002 with the purchase of Soundtracs, a British company known for early innovations in digital mixing consoles. In 2002 DiGiCo released their first console, the D5 Live, followed by the DS00 for the broadcast and post-production market, the D5T, specifically designed for the musical theatre market, and the D1 for the live sound market.

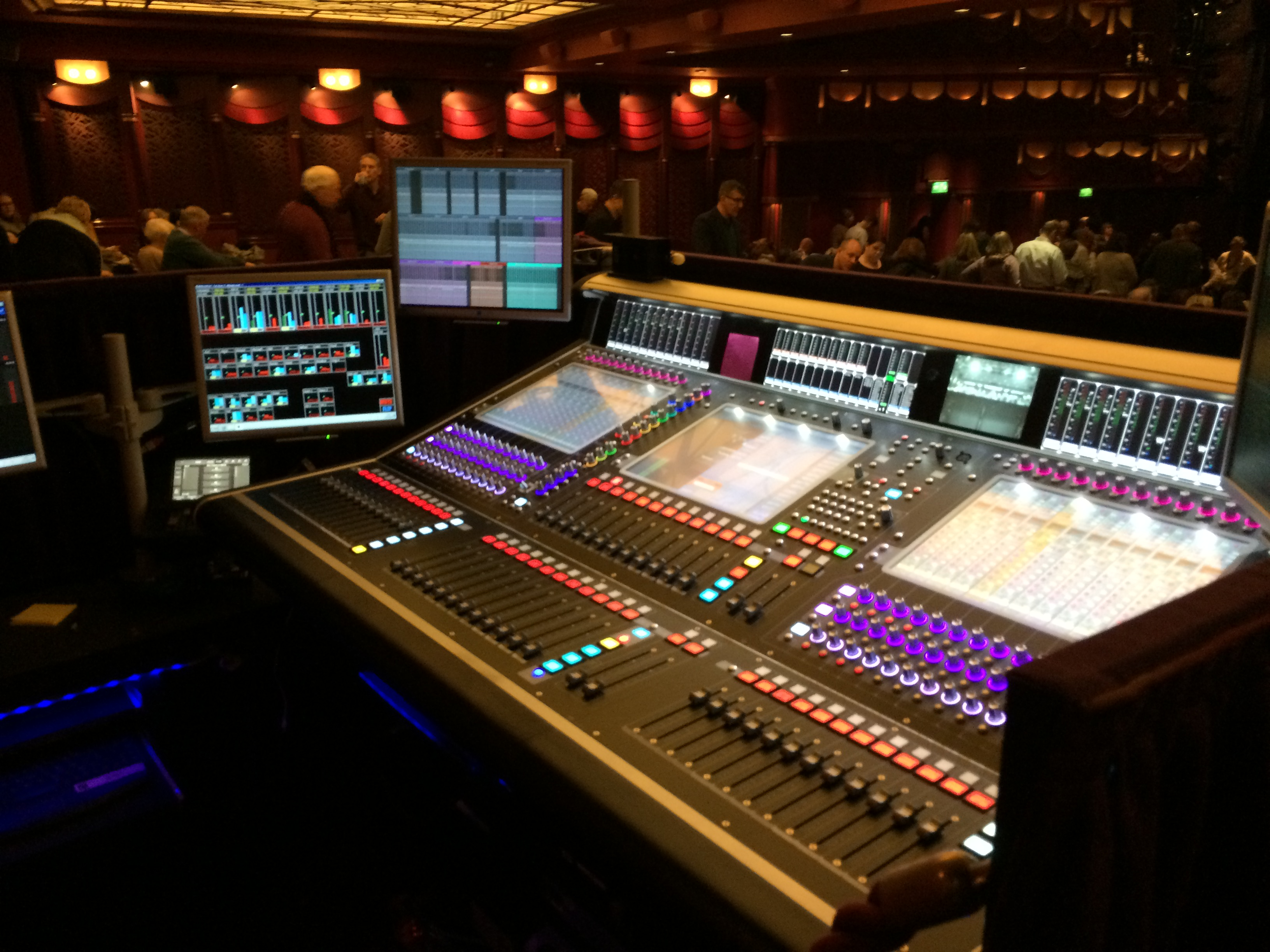
DiGiCo SD7T in use on the West End at the Prince Edward Theatre on Miss Saigon. (Feb 2016)

DiGiCo consoles became widely adopted for live concert tours and musical theatre productions; on tour, on Broadway in New York and in London's West End, and the D5 Live installed at venues like the London Coliseum. The "Theatre" versions of DiGiCo consoles utilize the company's Theatre software, developed in collaboration with Autograph Sound Recording founder Andrew Bruce, which provides a number of application specific features such as a specialized cue and DCA assignment system that allows spreadsheet-style editing of DCA members. The D5T has been utilized for productions including Les Misérables, Billy Elliot the Musical, Mamma Mia!, and We Will Rock You, .

In 2007, DiGiCo introduced its first SD-Range console, the flagship SD7. The SD-Range introduced DiGiCo's first use of a single large-scale FPGA for audio processing combined with Tiger SHARC DSP chips for effects processing and control, allowing the entire audio engine to fit on a single PCB. DiGiCo further expanded the SD-Series range with the introduction of the SD5, SD10, SD8, SD9 and rack-mountable SD11.

Optional software packages with functionality tailored to specific applications are available for most SD-Series console models. The SD7T, SD9T, and SD10T are Theatre models, while the SD5B, SD7B, SD9B, SD10B, and SD11B are Broadcast models.

Beginning in 2009, Waves Audio collaborated with DiGiCo for implementation of their SoundGrid audio networking and DSP. Together, the companies launched the DiGiGrid brand of audio interfaces for SoundGrid systems in 2013.

In 2014, DiGiCo was combined with Allen & Heath and Calrec to form the Audiotonix Group, and DiGiCo's CEO, James Gordon, was appointed CEO of the new holding company.

In 2016, DiGiCo introduced the S-Series digital mixing consoles, with the S21 and S31 priced below the SD-Range.

In 2020, DiGiCo updated the SD-Range consoles with Quantum software and eventually replaced the SD-Range with the Quantum Range, rebranding models like the SD5 Quantum and SD7 Quantum as the Quantum 5 and Quantum 7.

== In use ==
DiGiCo mixing consoles and peripherals are often utilized for concert sound reinforcement on tours and at music festivals like Summerfest and the Montreux Jazz Festival, and on tour with artists including Barbra Streisand, The Black Keys, Iron Maiden, Vampire Weekend, Queen + Adam Lambert, Maren Morris, Post Malone, Ed Sheeran, Green Day, Fall Out Boy, Weezer, Bruno Mars, Lady Gaga and OneRepublic.

DiGiCo mixing consoles are used for broadcast sound reinforcement, with examples including the Grammy Awards, The Tonight Show Starring Jimmy Fallon, Red Bull Arena in New Jersey, and the Super Bowl.

DiGiCo mixing consoles are also utilized for installed sound reinforcement applications, including the Jack Singer Concert Hall in Calgary, Alberta, Canada, Minnesota Orchestra Hall, Chicago Museum of Contemporary Art's Edlis Neeson Theater, Philadelphia's Kimmel Center for the Performing Arts, Hudson Hall, and Rady Shell at Jacobs Park, San Diego.

== Awards ==
- 2005 - The Queen's Award for Enterprise: Innovation (Technology)
- 2011 - The Queen's Award for Enterprise: Sustainable Development (International Trade Export)
