= Jerry Harvey =

Jerry Harvey may refer to:

- Jerry Harvey (screenwriter) (1949–1988), American screenwriter and film programmer
- Jerry Harvey (inventor) (born 1961), audio engineer

== See also ==
- Gerry Harvey (born 1939), Australian entrepreneur
- Jeremy Harvey (disambiguation)
