= UE 900 =

UE 900 and UE 900S
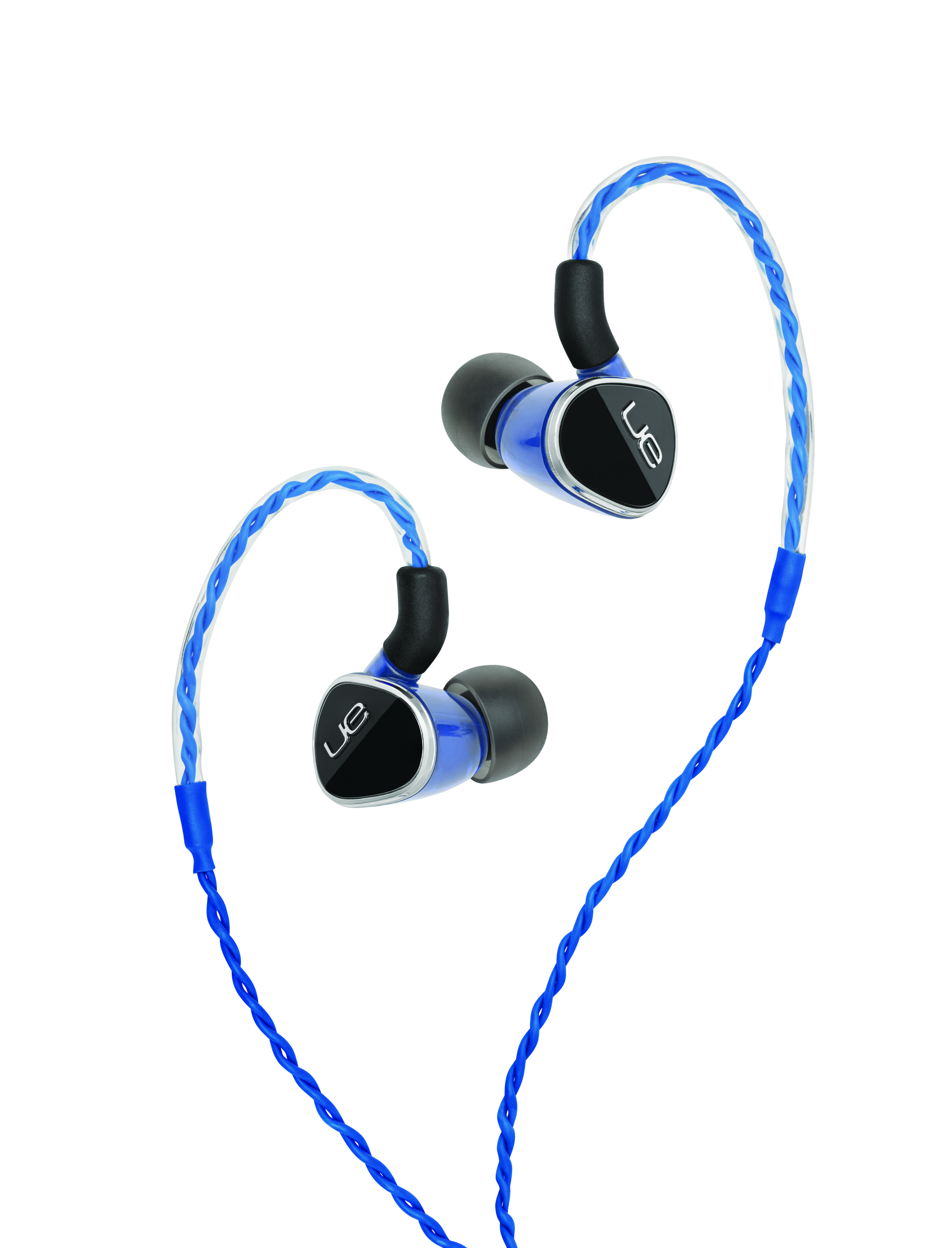
- UE 900S
- Manufacturer: Ultimate Ears (a subsidiary of) Logitech
- Sound: Sensitivity: 101.2 dB; Frequency response: 20 Hz to 20 kHz; Impedance: 30 Ω Noise isolation: 26 dB
- Connectivity: 3.5 millimetres TRRS
- Website: www.ultimateears.com/en-us/900s

The UE 900 and UE 900S are noise-isolating earphones produced and sold by Logitech, operating under the Ultimate Ears brand. They are designed for users seeking a neutral sound signature. CNET has rated them as among the top earphones in their respective price range.

The earphones received generally positive reviews overall. However, some users noted that the fitting method may be uncomfortable for certain listeners.

The earphones feature four armature drivers, comprising two for bass, one for midrange, and one for treble. They are bundled with a range of accessories typically found with higher-priced custom models.

== Design and accessories ==
The UE 900 earphones resemble custom-fit earphones and offer a secure fit that effectively seals the ear canals. They are provided with two cables: one in blue, featuring a microphone and a three-button remote control designed for iPhones, and another in black solely for audio. Both cables measure 48 inches (120 cm) in length. It has four balanced armatures in each earpiece. According to George Gill of the Los Angeles Post-Examiner, the UE900 employs a type of transducer originally developed for hearing aids but adapted for earphone use.

== Reception ==
The UE 900 garnered "Excellent" rating from Tim Gideon of PC Magazine who noted: "The UE 900 sounds excellent overall, with a robust bass response and slightly boosted highs to match."

Steve Guttenberg from CNET remarked that the UE 900 utilizes separate balanced armature drivers for bass, midrange, and treble frequencies, positioning it as the top-performing universal-fit earphone within its price category.

Matthew Miller reviewed the UE 900 for ZDNet in an article titled "You will swear you are listening to new music with the Logitech UE 900 earphones." In the summary of his review, he wrote: "My favorite pair until now has been the UE Super.fi 5 Pro, but Logitech UE did it even better with the new UE 900s."

The meta-review site Engadget commented on the headset, stating, "The UE 900s offer sound quality and a fit that comes close to what you'll get from UE's custom-fit in-ear models, with 9 sets of tips to fit just about any ears." However, they observed that it is a relatively expensive product.

Michael Calore of Wired, in an article titled "Ear Medicine," summarized his opinion about the UE 900 as follows: "The new flagship audiophile earphones from Ultimate Ears are just as awesome and perfect and beautiful-sounding as you'd expect from a $400 headset." He acknowledged that the exceptional audio quality might justify the high price. However, he expressed some dissatisfaction with the fit, which he described as "intrusive," suggesting that it may not suit everyone's preferences.

BT Travel, a mainstream magazine for business travelers, observed that the noise isolation performed very well during their test on a flight. However, they noted that this could potentially pose a challenge if someone wishes to engage in conversation with the listener.

The staff writer at IT News Africa noted that the sound is delivered cleanly.

Mixmag, a British electronic dance and clubbing magazine, described the UE 900 as one of the most high-definition earphones ever released by Logitech UE.

PC Magazine noted that assigning armatures to different frequencies enables more detailed reproduction in each specific range, ensuring that deep lows and crisp highs each have their dedicated driver. They observed that the lows are subtly lifted, resulting in a natural sound that preserves the integrity of instrumental and classical pieces, such as John Adams' "The Chairman Dances."

Wired praised the audio quality of the UE 900s, describing them as capable of producing "some truly glorious sound, supremely rich from one end of the audio spectrum to the other." They observed that the bass is robust and direct, the mid-range frequencies are accurately represented, and the high frequencies are slightly subdued at the very top end. Additionally, the reviewer highlighted the excellent clarity and ability to discern details that were previously unnoticed.

ZDNet characterized the sound of the UE 900 as clean, crisp, and authentic. The reviewer remarked that the listening experience made it feel as if they were present in the recording studio with the bands, noting that they had not encountered sound quality of this caliber before. Additionally, when using the UE900s with Beats Audio, which is integrated into various HTC smartphones, the reviewer observed a significant enhancement in the music they were listening to.

Stereophile's writer Ariel Bitran shared his impressions of the sound, stating, "The earphones propelled the beat with confidence, discipline, punctuation, and control, accenting the chunkiness of the groove without being edgy." He found the treble to be chunky, resulting in a non-fatiguing listening experience. Although cymbals were somewhat grainy, the midrange was described as ultra-clean, allowing him to discern instruments with precision. The bass extended deeply, enabling him to hear normally inaudible or subdued whole-note bass synths in the chorus as warm and full-bodied throughout. However, Bitran noted that some highly compressed recordings, such as those by the Red Hot Chili Peppers, sounded "boxed." He emphasized that the sound was realistic, controlled, and engaging, with instruments rich in tone and carefully restrained attacks, while still maintaining involvement with its texture in the high end. Overall, he concluded that the music was presented cleanly in front of the listener.

Witchdoctor, a New Zealand web magazine, noted that the UE 900s are able to balance between being highly revealing and overly clinical in their sound signature.

== See also ==
Ultimate Ears
