= Audiotonix =

British holding company

Audiotonix Group, Ltd.
- Company type: Private
- Founded: 2014; 12 years ago
- Headquarters: Chessington, United Kingdom
- Products: Professional audio equipment
- Revenue: EUR€1 Billion
- Number of employees: 550
- Subsidiaries: Allen & Heath; Calrec; DiGiCo; DiGiGrid; Fourier Audio; Group One Ltd.; KLANG:technologies; Slate Digital; Solid State Logic; Sonible; Sound Devices; DPA Microphones; Wisycom; Austrian Audio
- Website: www.audiotonix.com

Audiotonix Group, Ltd. is a British multinational holding company established in 2014 and headquartered in Greater London, United Kingdom. Audiotonix companies design and manufacture mixing consoles and professional audio equipment for live events and broadcast sound.

== History ==
Audiotonix was established in 2014 by combining Allen & Heath, Calrec, and DiGiCo. James Gordon, formerly DiGiCo's CEO, was appointed CEO of Audiotonix Group.

Audiotonix acquired Solid State Logic in 2017, and KLANG Technologies the following year.

In 2021, the company acquired Sound Devices, and Slate Digital the following year. In 2023, the company acquired Fourier Audio. The same year, Audiotonix company Solid State Logic acquired Harrison Audio.

In 2026, the company announced an agreement to acquire the three microphone companies, DPA Microphones, Wisycom, and Austrian Audio.

== Brands ==
- Allen & Heath
- Calrec
- DiGiCo
- DiGiGrid
- fourieraudio
- Group One Ltd
- Harrison Audio
- KLANG:technologies
- Slate Digital
- Solid State Logic (SSL)
- Sonible
- Sound Devices
- DPA Microphones
- Wisycom
- Austrian Audio
