= Wave audio =

Wave audio or variant, may refer to:

- Sound, vibrations carried on acoustic waves
- Acoustic wave, audio waves that carry sound
- .wav, waveform audio file format
- FM synthesis, sound synthesis technique, by manipulating generated pure waves
- Wavetable synthesis, sound synthesis technique
- Sample-based synthesis, sound synthesis technique, with a table of waves (box of samples)
- Waves Audio, Israeli professional sound company
