= Jeremy Harvey =

Jeremy Harvey may refer to:

- Jeremy Harvey (physicist), winner of the Dirac Prize
- Jeremy Harvey, a character in The Leap Years

== See also ==
- Jerry Harvey (disambiguation)
