= UE Boom 2 =

Bluetooth speaker

UE BOOM 2
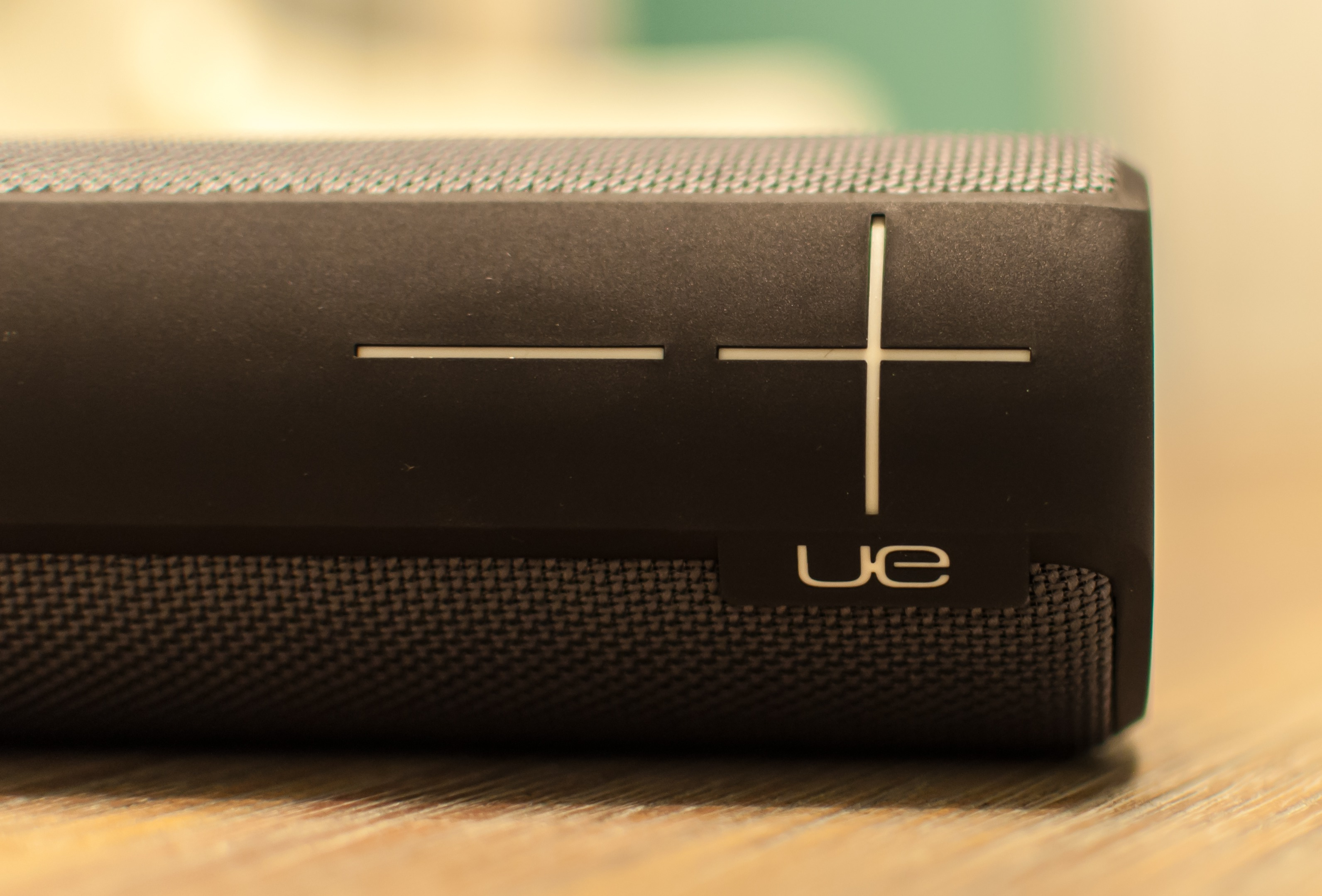
- Inception: 2015
- Manufacturer: Ultimate Ears
- Website: Official website

UE BOOM 2 is a compact, durable wireless Bluetooth speaker manufactured by Ultimate Ears, a subsidiary of Logitech, that offers 360-degree soundstage effect. It plays louder than the original Boom, sounds better and offers tap control. The speaker is stain-resistant, shock-resistant and fully waterproof. UE Boom 2 won GOOD DESIGN award for 2015–2016.

== Differences between Boom 2 and the original Boom ==
The drivers in the UE Boom 2 were completely redesigned and provide 25% increase in loudness at maximum volume. The bass response and overall sound quality were improved. It got larger 1.75 inch active drivers and 3 inch passive radiators while the original Boom got 1.5 inch active drivers and 2 inch passive radiators. UE Boom 2 has extended the Bluetooth range to 100 feet (30 meters). While the original Boom was water resistant, Boom 2 is fully waterproof IPX7 (immersion up to 1m for 30 minutes). In addition, Boom 2 won't be affected by water even if the USB charging port or audio inputs are exposed.

UE Boom 2 offers functionality that allows to pause music with one tap on the top of the speaker and skip tracks by tapping twice. The feature is facilitated by an included accelerometer. UE Boom 2 has a tighter weave on the fabric cover, making it more durable.

The update process has been redesigned and UE Boom 2 can be updated via the app, while UE Boom had to be connected to a computer. The second version of the speaker offers Block Party feature that allows up to three people to connect to it via Bluetooth and send music to shared playlist. The owner of the UE Boom 2 can then decide which music to accept for playback.

== Critical reception ==
David Carnoy reviewed the UE Boom 2 for CNET, remarking favorably on its design and Bluetooth range. He found the Bluetooth range to be 60 feet or 20 meters, more than double of the 10 meters range one finds in most Bluetooth speakers.

Will Greenwald reviewed the speaker for PC Magazine, concluding: "The new UE Boom 2 Bluetooth speaker from Ultimate Ears packs powerful sound in a colorful, rugged, waterproof build." The UE Boom 2 has been ranked as "Excellent" and "Editors' Choice".
