= UE ROLL =

Bluetooth Speaker

- Inception: 2015
- Manufacturer: Ultimate Ears
- Website: Official website

The UE ROLL is an ultra-portable speaker manufactured by Ultimate Ears, supporting Bluetooth and wired connections.

Announced on June 16, 2015, the UE Roll replaces Ultimate Ears's UE MINI BOOM as the company's lower-end model.

== Design and features ==
The speaker is of a discus-like shape, 13.5 cm (5.3 in) in diameter, 4.4 cm (1.7 in) maximum thickness, and weighing 330 grams (12 ounces). It is coated in a water-, dirt-, and stain-proof material and partly covered with rubber. Ultimate Ear's claims that the speaker is IPX7-rated waterproof, meaning that it can be fully submerged in water up to 1 m (3 ft 3 in) depth for up to 30 minutes.

The speaker comes in several colour schemes, and includes a "snap & go" bungee cord loop attached to the back of the device, which can be detached on one end. It is suggested that this allows the speaker to be hung up, or attached to, fixtures, as well as clothing, shower heads, bicycles, or even a person's hand.

UE ROLL consists of a 51-millimetre (2 in) driver coupled with two 19-millimetre (3/4 in) tweeters which are in stereo, so there is a small amount of stereo separation. In terms of sound output, it supports a maximum of 85 dBA in a range of 108 Hz–20 kHz. In addition to supporting Bluetooth, the speaker can be connected via a standard 3.5mm audio input. It also supports Bluetooth 4.0, allowing it to be remotely switched on by a connected mobile device running Ultimate Ear's app, and giving the speaker a wireless range of up to 20-metre (66 ft).

A rechargeable lithium-ion battery is built into the UE ROLL, providing up to 9 hours of playback. Charging is done using a provided micro-usb to usb cable, and is estimated to take 5.5 hours for a full charge.

== Critical reception ==
While generally well received as a rugged, weather-proof speaker, the UE ROLL has been criticised for a lack of deep bass.

TechRadar described the UE ROLL's greatest flaw being "that it replaces the Mini Boom".
