= Waves Audio =

Israeli professional audio company

Waves Audio Ltd.
- Industry: Software
- Founded: October, 1992
- Founder: Gilad Keren, Chief Executive Officer; Meir Shaashua, Chief Technological Officer; Yoad Nevo, Product Manager
- Products: Plug-ins for audio production, audio equipment
- Number of employees: 260
- Website: Waves.com

Waves Audio Ltd. is an Israeli developer and supplier of professional digital audio signal processing technologies and audio effects, used in recording, mixing, mastering, post production, broadcast, and live sound. The company's corporate headquarters and main development facilities are located in Tel Aviv, with additional offices in the United States, China, and Taiwan, and development centers in India and Ukraine. In 2011, Waves won a Technical Grammy Award.

== History ==
Waves Audio was founded in October 1992 by Gilad Keren and Meir Sha'ashua in Tel Aviv, Israel.

Later that year, Waves released its first product, the Q10 Paragraphic Equalizer. The Q10 was the audio industry's first commercially available audio plugin.

Waves' L1 Ultramaximizer, released in 1994, became a prominent plugin, with some publications pointing to it as contributing to the "loudness war" behind modern music mastering. Record producer Tony Maserati said of early Waves software, "[they] were the only plugins [that were] quality and they were creative." Waves later launched a signature line of Maserati inspired plugins.

Waves launched the Waves Signature Series working with music producers and engineers to explore their unique sounds. In 2009, as part of the Signature Series, Waves released the Eddie Kramer Signature Series of five plug-ins focusing on classic rock. The Chris Lord-Alge Signature Series followed in 2010. The Waves Signature Series continued in 2013 with the Manny Marroquin Signature Series. In 2015, Waves worked with music producer Butch Vig to release the Butch Vig Vocals plug-in as part of the Waves Signature Series.

In 2011, the company was honored with a Technical Grammy Award for "contributions of outstanding technical significance to the recording field."

In 2018, Waves released the Abbey Road TG Mastering Chain as part of their Abbey Road collection. The chain is modeled after the EMI TG12345 consoles used in the Abbey Road Studios mastering suites.

On March 26, 2023, in a controversial move, Waves introduced their subscription service, Waves Creative Access, while removing the Waves Update Plan as well as the sale of perpetual licenses. They re-introduced Waves Update Plan three days later, as well as perpetual licenses.

== Products ==
Waves Audio sells over 200 software products dedicated to music production, engineering, mixing, and mastering, in addition to a variety of virtual instruments and effects. Notable software includes:

Software	Function	Release date	Notes
Q10	Equalizer	1992	First audio plugin
L1 Ultramaximizer	Limiter	1994	L2 and L3 released in 2000 and 2005 respectively
SSL 4000 Collection	Channel strips for compression and EQ	2006	
Renaissance Maxx	Analog gear emulation plugins		
API Collection	Multiple modeled Automated Processes, Inc. consoles	2007	
Eddie Kramer Signature Series	Classic rock-oriented virtual instrument plugins	2009	
SoundGrid	Audio networking and plugin processing platform	2010	
Vocal Rider	Automatic vocal volume leveler	2010	
CLA-2A	Compressor, limiter		Part of the CLA Signature series
NS1 Noise Suppressor	Noise suppressor	2012	
NLS	Console emulators	2012	
Manny Marroquin Signature Series	Mixing plugins	2013	
C6 Multiband Compressor	Compressor	2013	
WLM Meter	Volume metering	2014	
eMotion LV1	Live mixer	2016	Software based live-audio mixing console with low latency
Dugan Automixer	Multiple microphone vocal mixer	2017	
Abbey Road TG Mastering Chain	Multiple, modeling Abbey Road Studios equipment	2018	
B360 Ambisonics Encoder	360 degree audio converter and mixer	2018	
Scheps Omni Channel	Andrew Scheps signature mixing channel strip	2018	
Submarine	Subharmonic frequency generator	2019	
Bass Fingers	Virtual instrument plugin	2019	
Waves Tune	Pitch-correction and auto-tuning in real time	2005	119th AES CONVENTION, NEW YORK, NY, October 7, 2005
Waves Tune Real-Time	Real-time version of Waves Tune	2016	
Nx Virtual Mix Room	Mixing plugin designed for headphones		
MultiRack	Virtual effects rack for live performance		
SuperRack	A virtual platform that incorporates plug-ins into mixing consoles (replaces MultiRack)	2019	
Abbey Road Studio 3	Studio monitor & Room emulation	2019	Working with Nx
Abbey Road Saturator	EMI TG12321 emulation	2019	
Waves Fit	FIT Controller for the eMotion LV1 Live Mixer	2020	16 fader hardware controller

Waves has launched plug-ins in collaboration with Abbey Road Studios, such as the King's Microphones plug-in released in 2011, the REDD Console plug-ins released in 2012, the J37 tape saturation plug-in, the Abbey Road Reverb Plates plugin, the RS56 Passive EQ plug-in released in 2013, and the EMI TG12345 plug-in released in 2014. Other software includes the Torque drum tone shifter plug-in.

Waves released the L2 Ultramaximizer hardware limiter in the year 2000, a device widely adopted by top mastering engineers and featured on thousands of iconic records.

== Technology ==
In 2010, Waves announced the release of its SoundGrid technology at the Winter NAMM show. SoundGrid was created to make Waves audio processors available on a low-latency platform. The SoundGrid system consists of a Linux-based server that runs the SoundGrid environment, compatible plug-ins, a Mac or Windows control computer, and a digital-analog interface for input/output (I/O). It is used for live sound, broadcast, and post production—s a low latency environment for audio processing on certain hardware audio mixing consoles, e.g., DiGiCo, Allen & Heath, and Yamaha.

Under its Maxx brand, Waves offers its technologies as licensable algorithms for consumer electronics. Technologies from the Maxx brand have been used in products including computers, laptops, smartphones, VoIP and portable loudspeaker systems from companies such as Dell, Toshiba, Sony, Oppo, OnePlus, Sanyo, JVC, and Altec Lansing.

Waves launched a Kickstarter campaign in 2016 to help fund the production of Waves Nx, a technology that transmits 3D audio on headphones in stereo or 5.1/7.1 surround sound. The technology generates a three-dimensional virtual audioscape that allows users to "detect which direction sounds are coming from."

Along with the Waves Nx, Waves has also developed the Waves B360 Ambisonics Encoder to assist engineers mixing 360-degree and VR audio projects. Audeze Mobius headphones are operated with Waves' Nx technology.

Currently, Waves Maxx technology is available on IoT, mobile, smart assistance, and communication devices. Waves Maxx partnerships include Google, Dell, LG, Acer, Fitbit, Qualcomm, and Intel. Additionally, Waves Nx technology for 3D audio is available in gaming headphones and other devices by Acer, and Audeze. Film score mixer Alan Meyerson said of Waves' technology, "[it has] changed the sound of film scores."

== Copyright and trademark lawsuits ==
In 2010, Waves Audio was involved in two lawsuits regarding intellectual property infringements and illegal use of its software. In one lawsuit, with the defendant Skyline Recording Studios NYC, Waves won, and in the other, with the defendant Quad Recording Studios, the defendant admitted liability.

In 2013, Waves Audio sued Motorola Mobility for allegedly infringing on its Maxx trademark with the Droid Razr Maxx and Droid Razr Maxx HD phones.
