= AKG (company) =

Austrian microphone and headphone manufacturing company

AKG Acoustics
- Type: Subsidiary
- Industry: Manufacturing; Acoustics
- Founded: 1947; 79 years ago
- Founder: Rudolf Görike; Ernst Pless
- Headquarters: Northridge, Los Angeles, California, United States
- Products: Microphones, Headphones, Digital Hi-Fi Sound Systems
- Owner: Samsung Electronics
- Number of employees: ~170
- Parent: Harman International Industries
- Website: www.akg.com

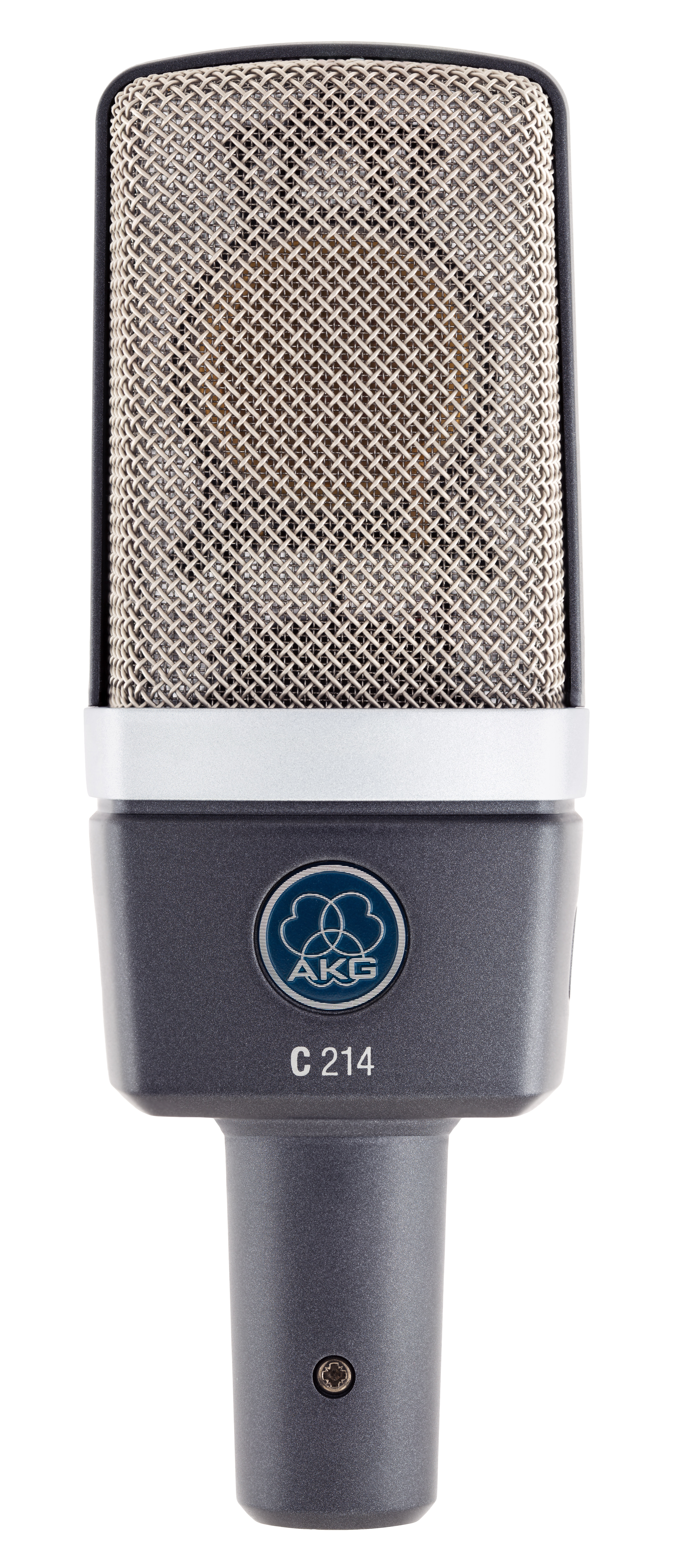
The AKG C214 condenser microphone

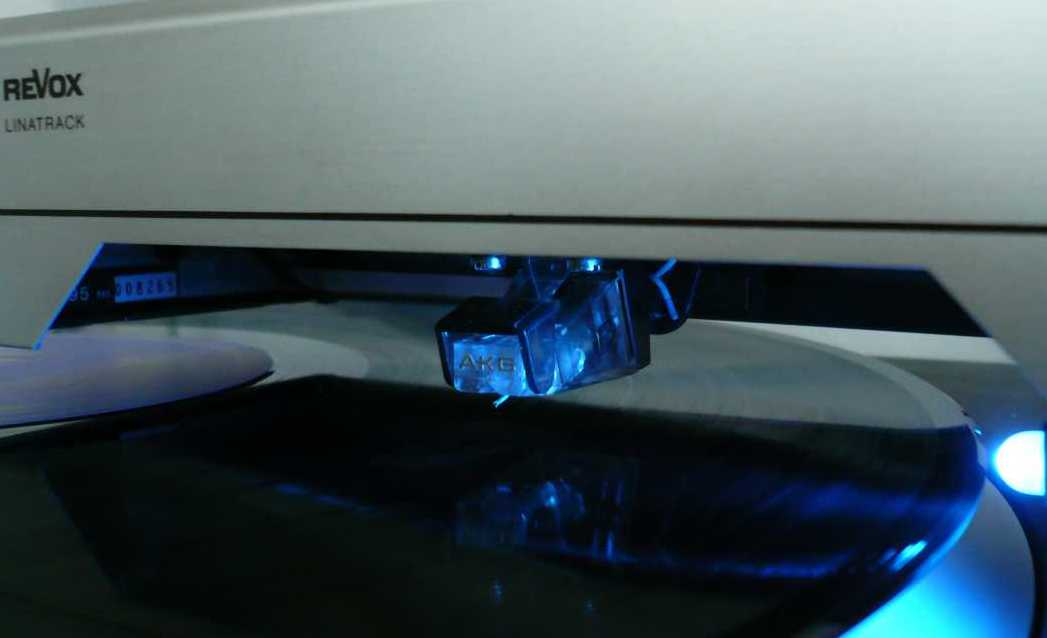
AKG S8X cartridge

AKG Acoustics (originally Akustische und Kino-Geräte Gesellschaft m.b.H., English: Acoustic and Cinema Equipment L.L.C.) is an acoustics engineering and manufacturing company. It was founded in 1947 by Rudolf Görike and Ernest Plass in Vienna, Austria. It is a part of Harman International Industries, a subsidiary of Samsung Electronics since 2017.

The products currently marketed under the AKG brand mostly consist of microphones, headphones, wireless audio systems and related accessories for professional and consumer markets.

== History ==
The company was founded in Vienna, Austria in 1947 by two Viennese scientists: physicist Rudolf Görike and engineer Ernst Pless.

Originally, its main business was to provide technical equipment for cinemas: loudspeakers, film projectors and light meters. The business slowly expanded and AKG started selling car horns, door intercoms, carbon microphone capsules for telephones, headsets and cushion speakers.

About this time, the company developed its first patents, the moving coil technology and the principle of mass load membranes, allowing its products to have extended frequency ranges.

With the creation of the D12 microphone in 1953, AKG achieved international fame, setting the standard for voice transmissions. It possessed excellent sonic qualities for that time, making its way into radio stations and recording studios from across the world. The product was improved through subsequent upgrades, spanning the famous C414 and C12 microphones.

By the end of the 1970s and into the 1980s magnetic cartridges were produced, such as the P25 in 1982.

In 1984, AKG became a public company, listed on the Vienna stock exchange. As a blue chip company, it was one of the most traded stocks.

The company was acquired by the American company Harman International Industries in 1994. By this time, AKG's United States subsidiary had been established (in Los Angeles in 1985). AKG Acoustics USA, still headquartered in the San Fernando Valley, also houses regional offices for Crown Audio, another Harman Industries subsidiary.

In 2010, the company received the prestigious Technical Grammy award.

In 2016 it was announced that the AKG Vienna facilities (headquarters, manufacturing, and engineering) would be shut down in 2017, with a transfer of brand headquarters to California, USA. Most current AKG-branded products are made in Harman's overseas production facilities.

In 2017, Samsung Electronics acquired Harman. In the same year, a group of former AKG engineers based in Austria formed Austrian Audio, competing with AKG.

== Timeline ==
- 1945 – Rudolf Görike and Ernst Pless begin supplying film equipment to theatres in post-war Vienna.
- 1949 – AKG founded by Görike and Pless as Akustische und Kino-Geräte Gesellschaft m.b.H.
- 1949 – AKG begins producing headphones, the first model being the K120 DYN.
- 1953 – introduces the world's first dynamic cardioid microphone
- 1955 – founds a German subsidiary
- 1985 – founds a U.S. subsidiary, based in Northridge, Los Angeles, California
- 1991 – produces its first wireless microphones, the WMS100 and WMS900
- 1994 – becomes part of Harman International Industries
- 2006 – produces a limited 60th anniversary edition of the celebrated C414 LTD microphone.
- 2010 – AKG Acoustics received a Grammy Award for the work the company has done in the recording field. Dinesh Paliwal, the current chief executive officer, picked up the award on behalf of the company.
- 2010 – AKG announces a partnership with Quincy Jones to manufacture a signature line of headphones featuring stylized designs and modified drivers.
- 2012 – AKG announces its partnership with disc jockey Tiësto to start manufacturing headphones under Tiësto's name.
- 2016 – Harman decided to shut down all facilities in Vienna in 2017.
- 2017 – Harman was bought by Samsung Electronics.
- 2017 – Headquarters of the AKG brand is transferred to California, United States

== Products ==
=== Microphones ===
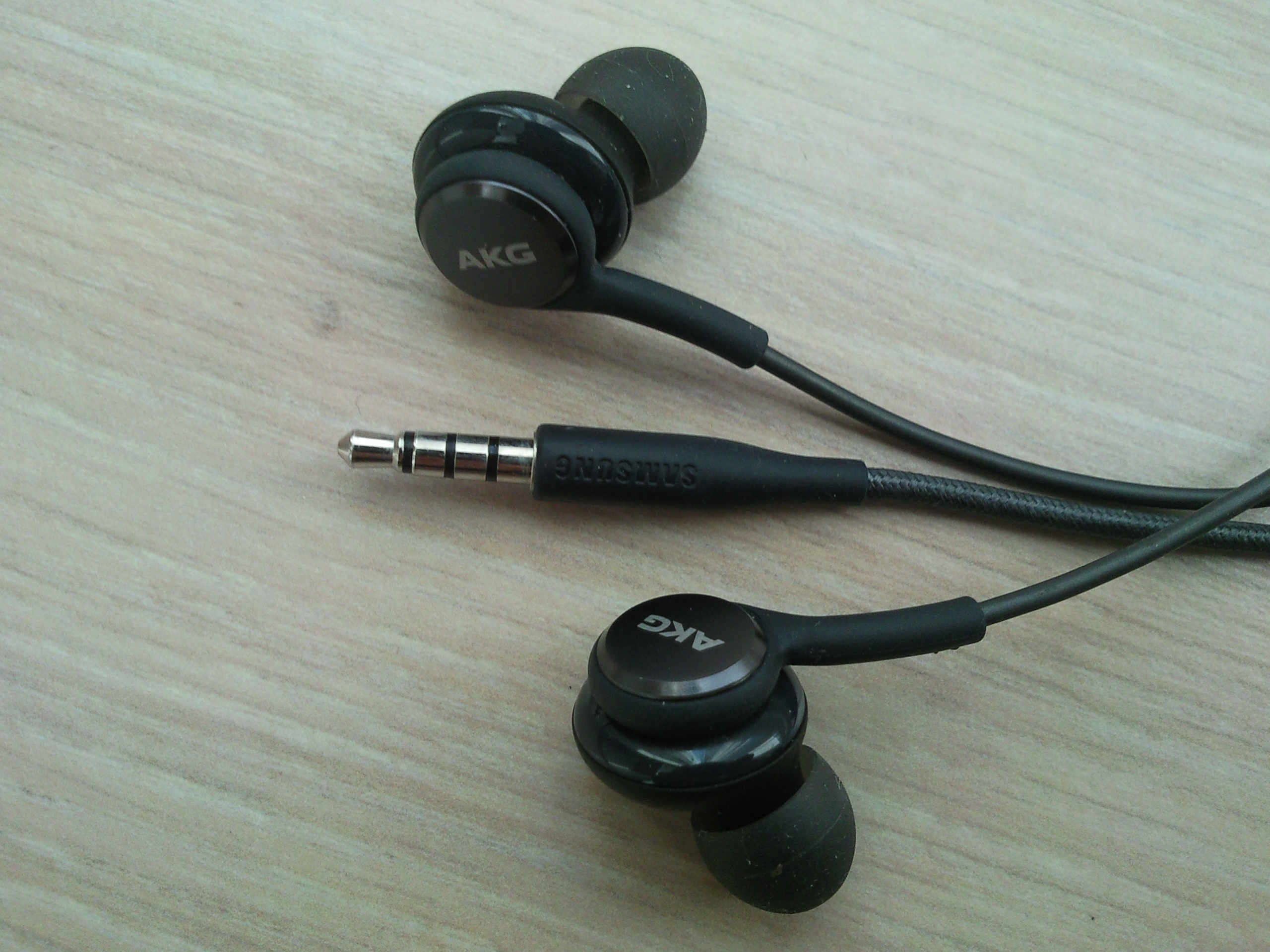
AKG Samsung bundle earphone

Among its professional products especially noteworthy is the first C 12 (introduced in 1953) and its successors and alternate versions, which include the Telefunken ELA M 250 and M 251 (1960), the C 24 stereo microphone, the C 412, and over a dozen different models which have carried the designation "C 414" in various forms. Those microphones are equipped with the famous CK12 large diaphragm capsule designed by AKG's engineer Konrad Wolf. The CK12 was a milestone in transducer technology and the first to offer constant frequency response and sensitivity for all polar patterns (omni to figure eight).

AKG microphones have been used for shooting Hans Hass's film Adventures in the Red Sea and were installed on the MIR space station. They are also mentioned by Dan Brown in his novels The Da Vinci Code and Deception Point.

Some microphone models include:

- D12E – a dynamic cardioid microphone with a bass boost between 60 and 120 Hz utilized for sources with high sound pressure and low-frequency content
- D130 – an omnidirectional microphone often used by reporters
- D19c – dynamic cardioid mic. Often used by Norman Smith and Geoff Emerick as drum overheads on Ringo Starr's drums on Beatles recording sessions (1964–1967)
- D190
- D222 – a dual capsule dynamic microphone used at the despatch boxes of the UK parliament
- D220
- D330 – a high-end dynamic vocal microphone used by ABBA.
- D112 – a large diaphragm dynamic microphone, popular for bass drums and other bass instruments
- C12 – a valve condenser microphone – the original version is now a collector's item selling for around $10,000
- C12VR – "The C12 VR is an enhanced version of the original C12, from the capsule sound to the original 6072A vacuum tube carefully handcrafted in Vienna, Austria."
- C214 – a large diaphragm condenser with single Cardioid pickup pattern
- C314 – a large diaphragm condenser with 4 variable pickup patterns, −20 dB Gain, 100 Hz HPF
- C414 – a large diaphragm condenser with 9 variable pickup patterns, −6/12/18 dB Gain, 3 variable HPF
- C451 – a small diaphragm condenser microphone, originally made between the 1960s and 1980s, recently reissued
- C535 – a high-quality condenser vocal microphone. AKG made a gold-plated one for Frank Sinatra.
- D409
- D5

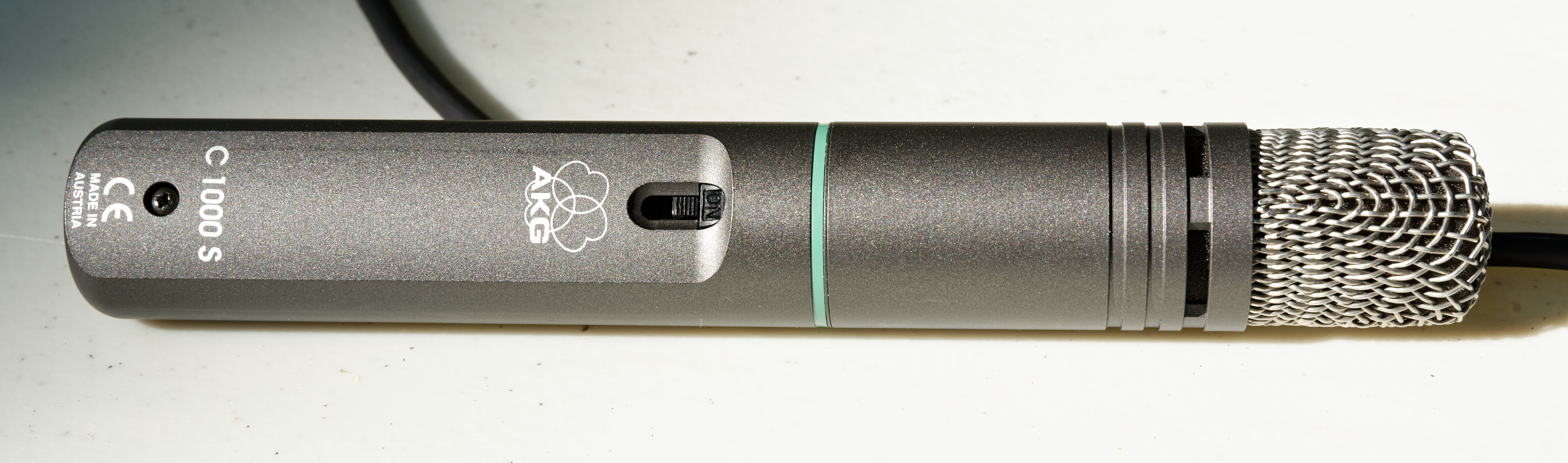
C1000S microphone

- C1000S – a small diaphragm condenser (four versions released from 1986 to 2012)
- C2000B – a side-address, small diaphragm condenser
- C3000(B) – a large diaphragm condenser (five versions released from 1993 to 2012)
- C4000B – a dual‑diaphragm multi‑pattern electret microphone
- SolidTube – (discontinued) A large-diaphragm microphone, cardioid polar pattern, dating from 1997. Use of a vacuum tube, (an ECC83 / 12AX7), for which spares are readily available, resulted in low-level distortion that may be perceived as an enhancement "warmth" to the sound. It featured a ground lift switch on the power supply, which can be useful in combating ground loop problems. Standard accessories included a spider type shock mount, pop screen and strong carrying case.
- DMS Wireless Microphone System

=== Headphones ===
AKG also manufactures a range of high-specification headphones.

The K50 model, introduced in 1959 were the world's first supra-aural and open-back headphones.

The K1000 was the flagship model, but is no longer being produced. It was a unique fully open headphone.

The current flagship model for the AKG headphone line-up is the K812.

The K702 features a removable cord and is black, the K701 is white. The Q701 also has a detachable cable and comes in three color variants: white, black, and a lime green. All three models are still in production. The K701s have been largely used by professional musicians and technicians in recording studios.

Many top recording studios use AKG K240 headphones as a solution for best general use for both monitor and playback. They received particular notoriety from their prominent display in Eddie Murphy's 1985 music video for "Party All the Time" (which features the K240 Monitor).

Another notable, yet short-lived, model was the K280 Parabolic, a multi-driver headphone which focused compression waves to a central point in the earcup.

As well as studio headphones, AKG also manufactures a range of Hi-Fi headphones and earphones for domestic use. One notable use includes Samsung, their parent company, using AKG to tune their headphones that come equipped with Samsung's most-recent flagship devices, starting with the Galaxy S8, S8+ to Note 20 and Note 20 Ultra, the stereo speakers as of the Galaxy S9, S9+, S10E, S10+, Note 9, and the Note 10 (USB Type-C connector).

In 2017, the Y50 model was awarded Product of the Year for on-ear headphones by What Hi-Fi? magazine.

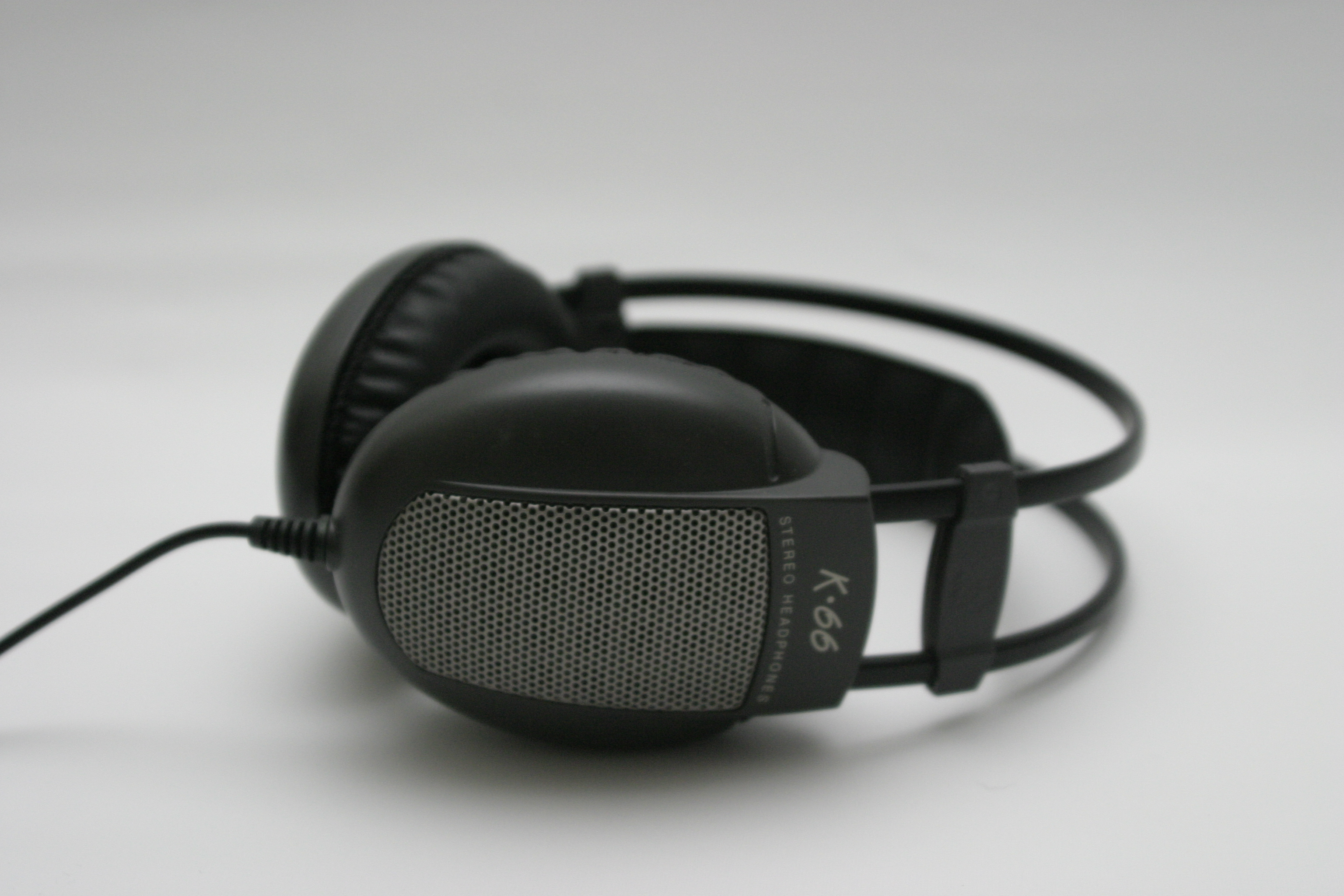
AKG K-66 Stereo headphones

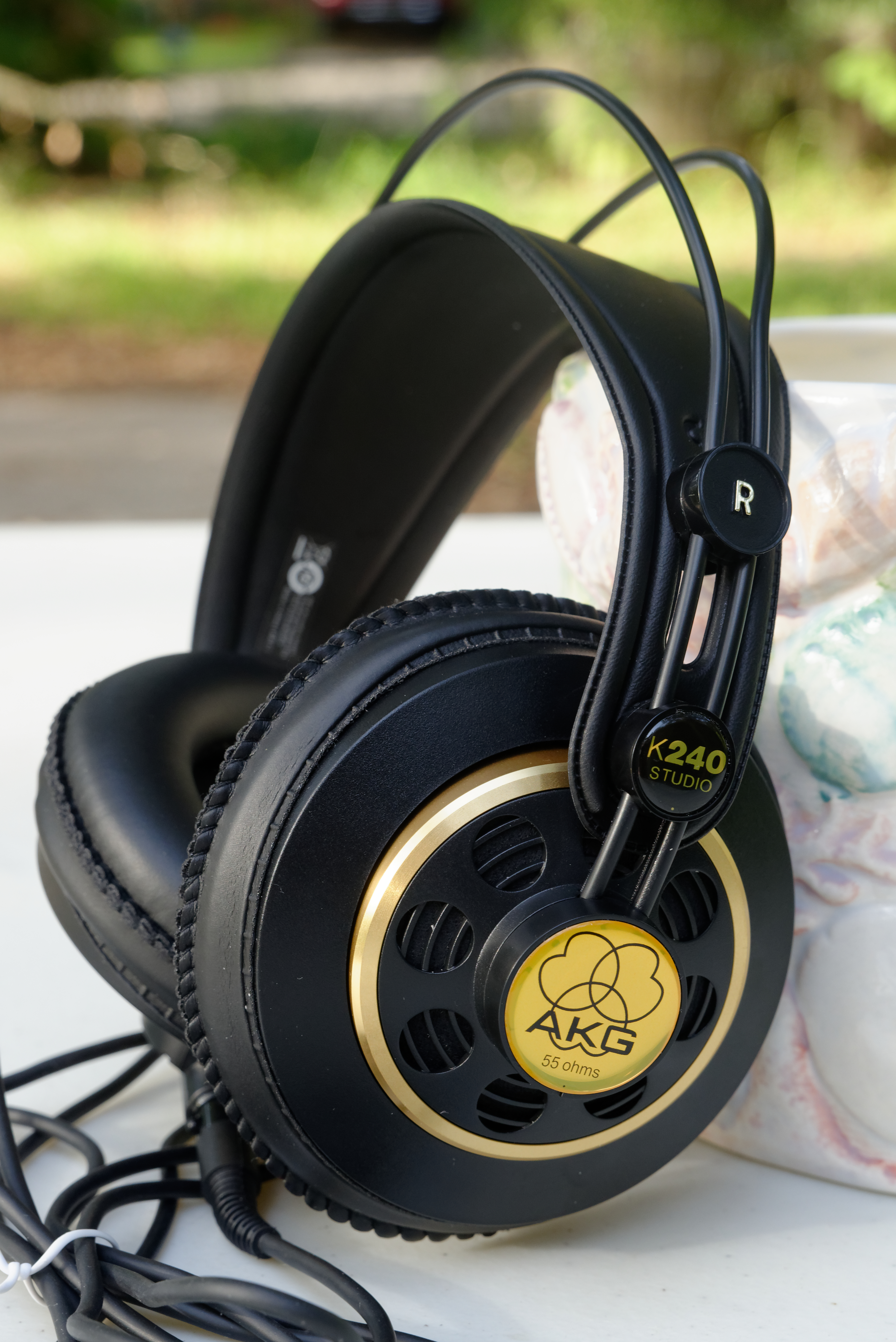
AKG K240 headphones

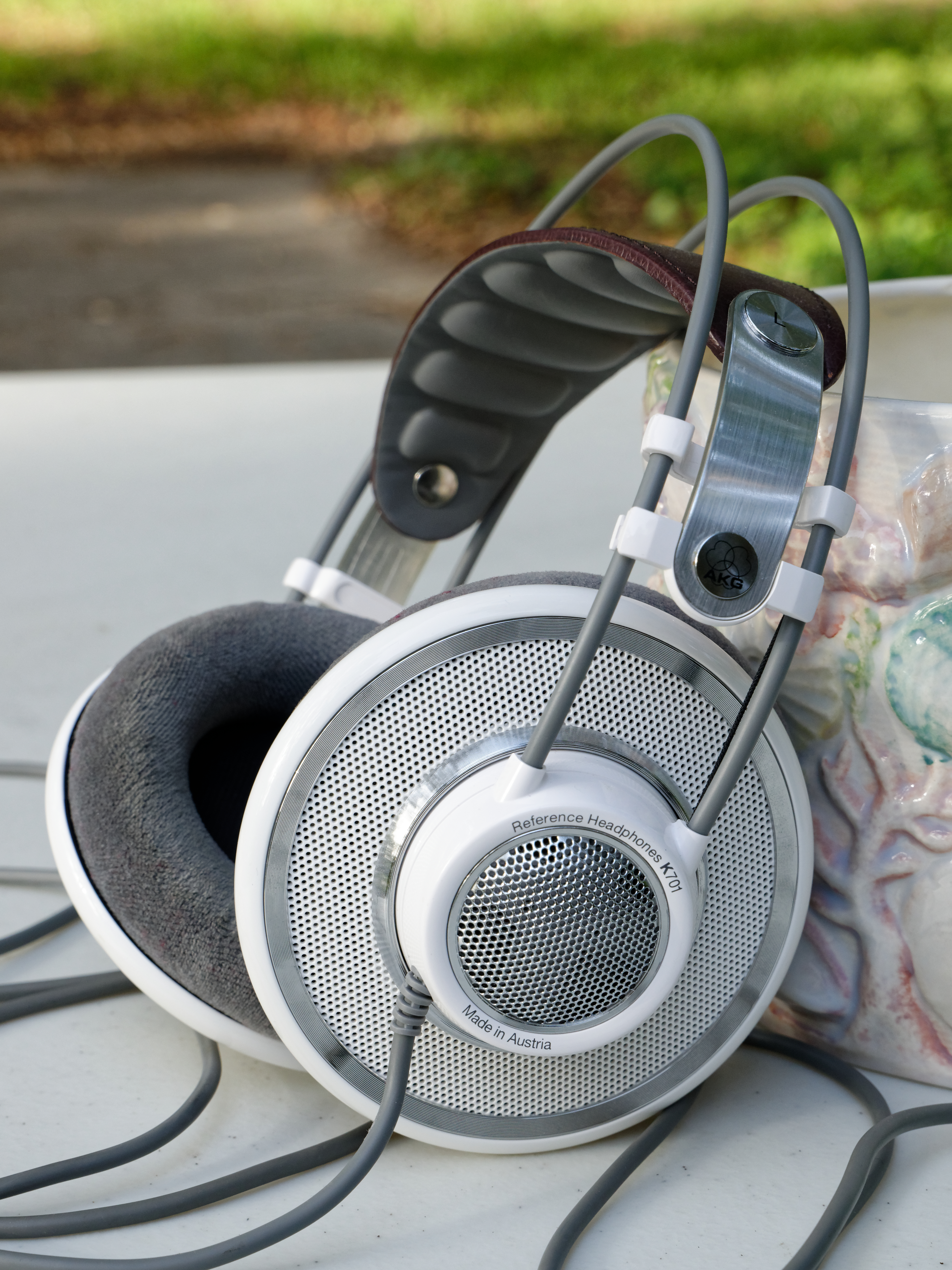
AKG K701 headphones

== See also ==
- List of microphone manufacturers
- Crown International
