= UE Boom =

Portable Bluetooth speaker

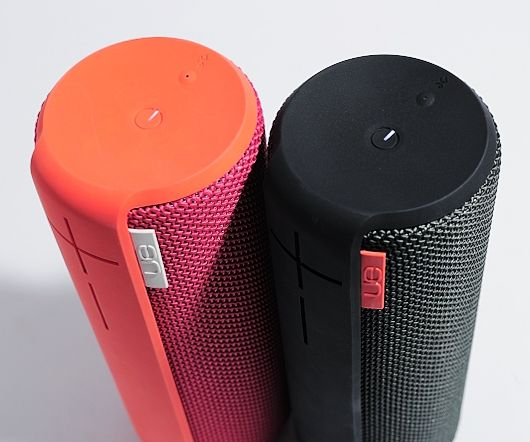
- Inception: 2013
- Manufacturer: Ultimate Ears
- Website: Official website

UE Boom is a portable speaker manufactured by Ultimate Ears, supporting Bluetooth and wired connections. UE Boom has been praised for its industrial design, loudness, battery life, speakerphone capability, and its suitability for outdoor use, but criticized for its comparatively high price.

The speaker was first introduced on May 21, 2013, and went on sale in the United States and Europe later that month.

On September 15, 2015, Ultimate Ears introduced the UE Boom 2, a revised model of the UE Boom. The new model featured IPX7 waterproofing, a 25% increase in volume, and superior wireless range over the original model.

The third revision, UE Boom 3, was announced on August 30, 2018 with a personalized version of the speaker announced on March 4, 2019.

== Design and features ==
The speaker is an elongated cylinder measuring 18 cm × 6.5 cm (7.1 in × 2.6 in), similar in shape to a canned beverage, and weighing 538 g (19.0 oz). It is coated in a water- and stain-resistant material and partly covered with rubber. The speaker comes in several colorways, including a limited edition designed by painter Kenny Scharf. The design and cylindrical shape was described by iLounge as "different from most competitors and yet consistent with both prior UE Boombox designs".

UE Boom consists of two 38-millimetre (1.5 in) drivers at 4 Ω, and has two passive radiators measuring 51 millimetres (2 in). In terms of sound output, it supports a maximum of 88 dBA in a range of 90 Hz–20 kHz. On one end, it has a removable D-ring, which one reviewer suggested might be used to hang the device like a lantern. In addition to supporting Bluetooth, the speaker can be connected via a standard 3.5mm audio input. It also supports passive NFC, can be used as a Bluetooth speakerphone and has an alarm feature. Additionally, two speakers can be paired to one source, with each speaker playing back a separate channel, or both speakers playing both channels.

A recently released firmware update enabled a feature called "PartyUp" which allows a person to pair 150+ UE Boom, Boom 2, and MegaBoom speakers, and have them all playing music from a single source.

== Critical reception ==
CNET rated the UE Boom four stars out of five, favoring it as versatile, durable, portable and loud. CNET also commented that, like most small speakers, the UE Boom "just doesn't deliver a ton of bass", and that at higher volumes, the UE Boom may distort "bass-heavy material".

Will Greenwald reviewed the UE Boom for PC Magazine, remarking favorably on its design, volume and stereo pairing function. He noted that there was emphasis on the low-midrange tones. Greenwald also noted that the UE BOOM "doesn't exactly impress" in terms of low frequency sound. In testing the claim that the UE Boom produced "360-degree sound", he noted that the speaker's imaging did not suffer with different placement or listening position.

A reviewer for the New Zealand Herald praised it for ease-of-use and quality of sound.

In 2014, UE Boom received an iF product design award in the audio category.
