= Austrian Audio =

Audio equipment manufacturer

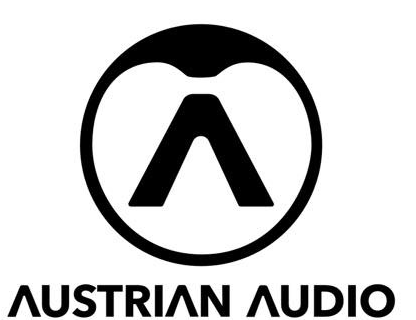
- Logo
- Type: Private
- Industry: Audio electronics
- Founded: July 1, 2017; 9 years ago in Vienna, Austria
- Headquarters: Vienna, Austria
- Key people: Martin A. Seidl, CEO
- Parent: DPA Microphones
- Website: austrian.audio

Austrian Audio is an Austrian company specializing in the design and manufacture of microphones and headphones for professional users (stage and studio technology). Founded in July 2017, the company's establishment was prompted by the closure of the AKG Acoustics offices in Vienna, Austria. In 2025 the company has been acquired by DPA Microphones.

== History ==
=== Background ===
Austrian Audio's origins can be traced to the closure of AKG Acoustics' operations in Austria. Founded in Vienna in 1947 by physicists Rudolf Görike and Ernst Pless, AKG Acoustics initially supplied technical equipment for cinemas, including loudspeakers, film projectors, and light meters. The business slowly expanded and AKG started selling car horns, door intercoms, carbon microphone capsules for telephones, headsets and cushion speakers. While AKG Acoustics initially manufactured its products in Austria, in response to cost considerations, production of high-end audio products was later moved to Slovakia, while other products were manufactured in China.

In 1993, AKG Acoustics was acquired by Harman International Industries for the symbolic value of one Schilling. In late 2016, Harman was acquired by the Korean Samsung Group. Following this acquisition, it was announced that the AKG locations in Austria, especially the factory in Liesing with about 130 employees, would be completely closed and relocated by mid-2017. Some employees were offered the opportunity to relocate to other countries' facilities, such as Germany or Hungary. Essentially, AKG Acoustics has since only existed as a brand within the Harman division of the Samsung Group. Product development is now handled by Harman facilities in Eastern Europe.

=== New enterprise ===
In July 2017, following the complete closure of AKG's site in Austria, Austrian Audio was founded by a core team of 22 former AKG employees from the fields of management, acoustics, electronics, testing and measurement, mechanical design, wireless technology, as well as software and firmware. The company spent more than a year developing its first microphone capsule, the CKR12, before introducing its first two products, the OC818 and OC18 large-diaphragm condenser microphones, in 2019.

In 2025 DPA Microphones acquired a majority share in Austrian Audio, with Austrian Audio maintaining their presence in Austria.
