= DPA Microphones =

Danish manufacturer of microphones

- Industry: Audio electronics
- Founded: 1992; 33 years ago in Kokkedal, Denmark
- Founders: Morten Støve, Ole Brøsted Sørensen
- Headquarters: Kokkedal, Denmark
- Key people: Kalle Hvidt Nielsen, CEO
- Parent: Palladio Holding S.p.A
- Website: dpamicrophones.com

DPA Microphones is a Danish manufacturer of condenser microphones for the professional audio market. The company's headquarters is in Kokkedal, Denmark, and the production plant is in Asnæs. It is owned by the Italian private equity fund, Palladio Holding S.p.A..

== History ==
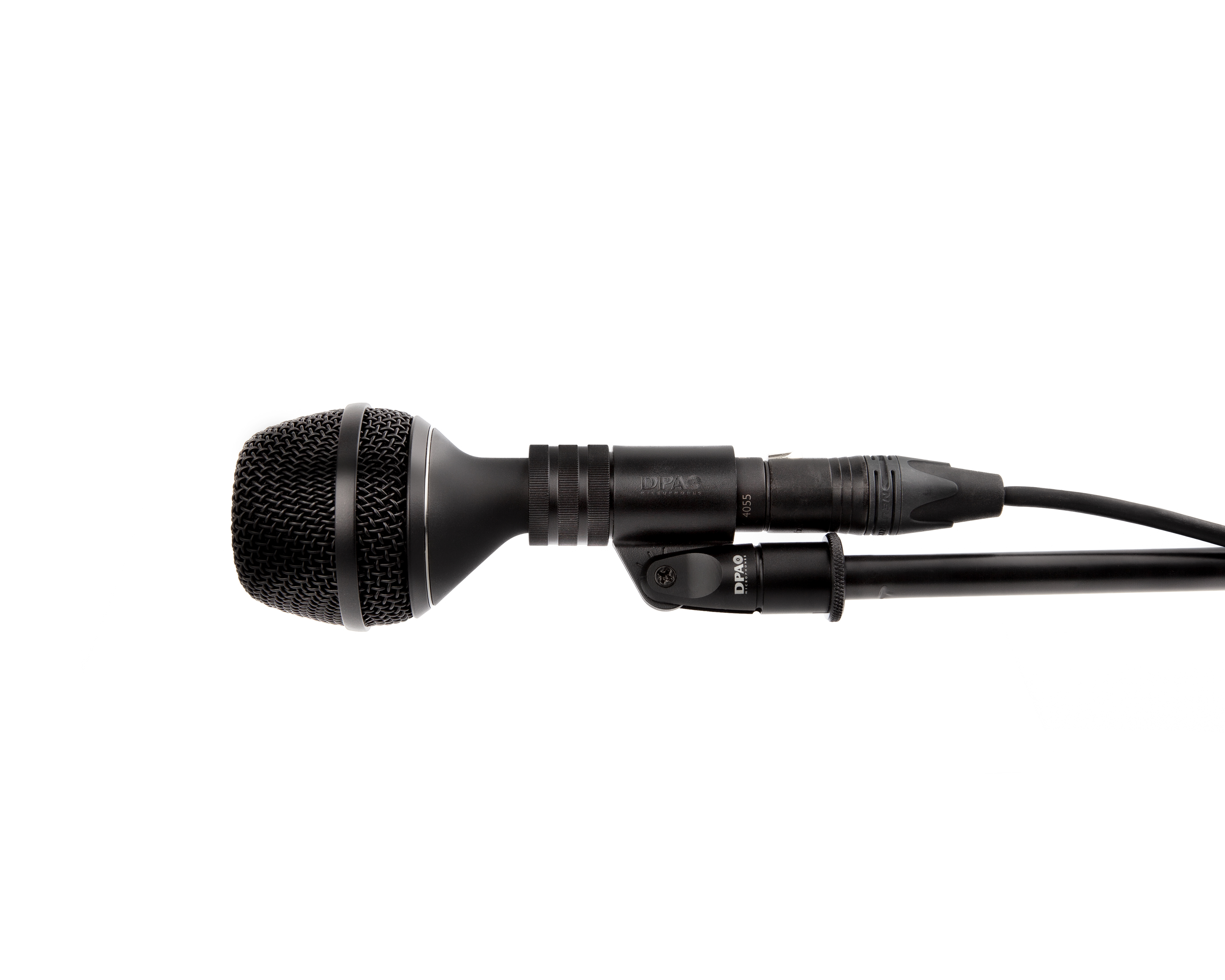
DPA 4055 Kick Drum Microphone

The company was founded in 1992 as Danish Pro Audio by two former employees from Brüel & Kjær - Morten Støve and Ole Brøsted Sørensen. Brüel & Kjær had decided to close their pro audio division and Støve and Sørensen made a contract with B&K to take over sales, service and development. At that time, DPA focused solely on high-end studio microphones for recording and broadcast. In 1995 they teamed up with Dan Ingemann Jensen and Jens Jørn Stokholm from DanaBallerina (later Muphone) and co-developed the later famous DPA 4060 and 4061 miniature condenser microphones.

In 2017, DPA introduced a new series of products called CORE by DPA, which were designed to solve problems associated with the use of lavalier microphone with newer digital wireless transmitters. The first product to launch using the new CORE by DPA microphone design was the 4060 series of lavaliers followed by the 6060 series of lavaliers.

On July 30, 2020, NASA launched the Perseverance rover for a seven-month journey to Mars, equipped with a DPA 4006 Omnidirectional Condenser Microphone, an MMA-A Digital Audio Interface, and an MMP-G Modular Active Cable in tow. The rover touched down successfully on February 18, 2021, and the DPA equipment began recording the first-ever heard sounds from Mars' hostile atmosphere.

In 2025, DPA again improved their lavalier microphones with the introduction of CORE+, a technology that eliminates distortion at high levels, and introduced its first wireless microphone system, the N-Series. The same year, DPA acquired a majority share of Austrian microphone and headphone manufacturer Austrian Audio.
