= Ultimate Ears =

American audio equipment manufacturer

- Logo used since May 31, 2017
- Type: Subsidiary
- Industry: Consumer electronics
- Founded: 1995
- Founder: Jerry Harvey, Mindy Harvey
- Headquarters: Irvine, California
- Area served: Global
- Products: Earphones; Custom Earphones (in-ear monitors); Wireless/Bluetooth Speakers; UE Wonderboom; UE Megaboom; UE Boom
- Owner: Logitech (2008–present)
- Website: Official website (for Custom Earphones); Official website (for Wireless/Bluetooth Speakers)

Logo used from early 2004 to 2017. Still used at its Irvine, CA headquarters.

Ultimate Ears is an American custom in-ear monitor (IEM), speaker, and earphone manufacturer based in Irvine and Newark, California, United States. It was founded by Mindy and Jerry Harvey in 1995, who created a new market for custom IEMs now used by some of the world's top musicians. In August 2008, it was acquired by Logitech and operates as a subsidiary.

== History ==
In 1995, Jerry Harvey was Van Halen's touring monitor engineer, mixing their stage sound through stage wedges—powerful loudspeakers aiming at each of the musicians. Drummer Alex Van Halen had great difficulty hearing the other band members over all the noise of the stage; louder monitors did not help. Harvey created a custom molded earpiece for the drummer to block some of the stage noise and focus on the desired sound: a prototype earpiece that contained two tiny speaker drivers, one for low frequencies and one for high frequencies, the frequencies split by a passive audio crossover. The high frequency driver was a stock Japanese component but a suitable low frequency driver was difficult to find. The only driver which survived strong kick drum signals was a Knowles-made pacemaker part, a balanced armature transducer intended to warn the pacemaker wearer of internal problems. Other Van Halen band members became interested and Harvey crafted further sets. The musicians touring with Van Halen—Skid Row—wanted some in-ear monitors and Harvey sold them six pairs for $3,000. Pop singer Engelbert Humperdinck wanted a set and at that point Harvey determined to start a company to supply the demand.

Harvey and his wife Mindy decided to divorce at the same time as they joined as business partners in Las Vegas, Nevada, where they incorporated Ultimate Ears. Mindy Harvey later said, "Ultimate Ears is the child we never had ...and in the big picture, getting divorced was the only way to spread the word about the company." The company was run from Mindy's home, offering not just custom-molded earpieces but the associated radio transmitters and receivers intended for use onstage by performing musicians. Jerry Harvey promoted the systems and also helped Shure produce their E1 and E5 IEMs, "the first universal-fit dual-driver monitors." Helping Shure make this product also helped the new company Ultimate Ears gain respectability. Ultimate Ears first became significantly profitable in 1998 with the introduction of the UE-5 model; the fifth of Harvey's designs. Customers included the Rolling Stones, Faith Hill, Enrique Iglesias, and the Red Hot Chili Peppers.

=== Westone, Innovate Partners, Logitech ===
From the beginning, Ultimate Ears partnered with Westone to manufacture Harvey's designs, but in 2001 Westone began to operate a separate distribution channel in Europe, selling the IEMs as their own designs, holding all the Ultimate Ears trademarks and patents. Relations between Westone and Ultimate Ears soured. Harvey did not have any patents, so it was difficult for him to separate his design, marketing and sales business from the manufacturer. At the beginning of 2002, Ultimate Ears opened their own lab, hiring Chomphorn "Noy" Soudaly, an audiologist and hearing aid technician, to run the lab. In April 2002, Ultimate Ears produced an upgraded model without Westone's help. The Harveys were able to retain nine out of ten customers; the remainder became customers of Westone. In 2003, Ultimate Ears had five employees and held about 80% of the professional IEM market.

Harvey went out on tour with Linkin Park to get back in contact with touring musicians and while on tour he noticed the popularity of iPods and other mp3 players. He returned with the idea that Ultimate Ears should offer a consumer model for audiophile listeners. The resulting UE-5c appeared in January 2004 sold for $550. High sales of these doubled the company's income. Pursuing this direction further required outside investment, and the Harveys contacted Bob Allison, owner and CEO of Innovate Partners, an investment holding company in Irvine, California. Allison became the CEO of Ultimate Ears as the company moved to Irvine, with Mindy Harvey the president and Jerry Harvey the CTO. Innovate Partners helped Ultimate Ears develop a manufacturing source in China to provide the expected volume of sales. By April 2005, the resulting Super.fi 5 Pro, a double armature product, was offered to consumers at $250 per pair, and sales of these helped Ultimate Ears to gross more than $10 million in 2006. That same year, Ultimate Ears teamed with M-Audio and with Altec Lansing to produce rebranded lines of earpieces, one sold under the management of M-Audio (their IE model line) and the other under the Altec Lansing name.

Harvey left Ultimate Ears in 2007 after designing and producing the UE-10 Pro and then the UE-11, the first 3-way and 4-way (respectively) IEM products from Ultimate Ears. Harvey said he was "forced out" by Allison who wished to strengthen his position as leader.

Ultimate Ears was acquired by Logitech in August 2008. The $34 million deal bought out Mindy Harvey's share and gave Logitech its first in-ear earphones product line. Allison continued as division CEO. Logitech's vice president in charge of headsets and earbuds, Philippe Depallens, said that even after the departure of both Jerry and Mindy Harvey, the company has been able to "keep carrying the torch of having the best in-ear monitors in the market."

=== Portable speaker market entry ===
On May 21, 2013, Ultimate Ears entered the portable, wireless consumer speaker market with the introduction of the UE Boom.

== Products ==
=== Wireless Bluetooth Speakers ===
- UE BLAST: 360° sound, IPX7 waterproof, Amazon Alexa built in
- UE BOOM: 360° sound with dual performance drivers and dual passive radiators.
- UE BOOM 2: 360° sound, fully waterproof IPX7, rugged (Model: S-00151)
- UE BOOM 3: 360° sound, fully waterproof IP67, floats on water
- UE BOOM 4
- UE MEGABLAST: 360° sound, IPX7 waterproof, Amazon Alexa built in
- UE MEGABOOM: 360° sound with dual passive radiators, performance drivers and advanced digital signal processing, IPX7 waterproof (Model: S-00147)
- UE MEGABOOM 2
- UE MEGABOOM 3: 360° sound, fully waterproof IP67, floats on water (Model: S-00171)
- UE MEGABOOM 4
- UE ROLL: 360° sound in an IPX7 waterproof case
- UE ROLL 2: 360° sound, IPX7
- UE MINIROLL
- UE WONDERBOOM: 360° sound in IPX7 waterproof case, floats on water (Model: S-00163)
- UE WONDERBOOM 2: 360° sound in IP67 waterproof case, floats on water, outdoor mode (Model: S-00174)
- UE WONDERBOOM 3: 360° sound in IP67 waterproof case, floats on water, outdoor mode, made with 30% recycled plastic (Model: SR-0192)
- UE WONDERBOOM 4
- UE EVERBOOM
- UE EPICBOOM
- UE HYPERBOOM: 270° sound with dual passive radiators, adaptive EQ, IPX4 waterproof

=== Headphones ===
- UE 4000: On-Ear
- UE 6000: Over-Ear
- UE 9000: Wireless Over Ear

=== Universal Fit Earphones ===
- TripleFi 10: triple balanced armatures with passive crossover
- Ultimate Ears 900: quadruple balanced armatures with passive crossover
- Ultimate Ears 700: dual balanced armatures with passive crossover
- Ultimate Ears 600: single balanced armature
- Ultimate Ears 600vi, identical to 600, but adds built-in microphone and on-cord controls
- Ultimate Ears 500: single dynamic driver
- Ultimate Ears 500vi: identical to 500, but adds built-in microphone and on-cord controls
- Ultimate Ears 350: single dynamic driver
- Ultimate Ears 350vi: identical to 350, but adds built-in microphone and on-cord controls
- Ultimate Ears 200: single dynamic driver
- Ultimate Ears 200vi: identical to 200, but adds built-in microphone and on-cord controls
- Ultimate Ears 100: single dynamic driver, 10 colorful designs

Like all earphones the Ultimate Ears consumer monitors require the user to test varying sizes of ear cushions (included with the purchase) in order to achieve the proper fit for noise isolation.

=== Legacy consumer products ===
- The MetroFi 100 with a 10mm mylar driver.
- The MetroFi 100vi, designed for the iPhone, with a 10mm mylar driver and inline microphone.
- The MetroFi 150 with a dynamic driver
- The MetroFi 150v, designed for the iPhone with a dynamic driver and inline microphone.
- The MetroFi 170 with a small dynamic driver
- The MetroFi 170vi, designed for the iPhone with a small dynamic driver and inline microphone.
- The MetroFi 200, with a dynamic driver.
- The MetroFi 220, with a small titanium dynamic driver.
- The MetroFi 220vi, designed for the iPhone with a small titanium dynamic driver and inline microphone.
- The SuperFi 3 Studio with one balanced armature driver.
- The SuperFi 4 with a proprietary balanced armature speaker.
- The SuperFi 5 with one Proprietary balanced armature driver.
- The SuperFi 5vi designed for iPhone, with one Proprietary balanced armature driver.
- The SuperFi 5 EB with one balanced armature and one 13.5mm diaphragm driver.
- The SuperFi 5 Pro with Dual balanced armature drivers with an inline crossover.
- The Loud Enough, designed for children 6 and up, with a 10mm mylar driver and limits sound pressure levels to 60%.
- TripleFi 10vi, a modification of the standard TripleFi 10 Pro designed for the iPhone which adds an inline microphone.
- UE MINI BOOM: dual performance drivers and one passive radiator.

=== Custom In-Ear Monitors ===
- The UE Live hybrid, with Seven Balanced, precision armatures & single Dynamic 6mm Neodymium Driver, with Four-Way Crossover
- The UE18+ Pro with Six Balanced, precision armatures, with Four-way Mixed Crossover.
- The UE In-Ear Reference Monitors with Triple Balanced, precision armatures, with multiple Integrated Passive Crossover
- The UE18 Pro with Sextuple Balanced Armature Driver Technology, with Four-way Integrated Passive Crossover
- The UE11 Pro with Quadruple Balanced Armature Driver Technology, Single High-end Frequencies Driver, Single Mid Frequencies Driver, and Dual Low-End Frequencies with Three-way integrated Passive Crossover
- The UE7 Pro with Triple Balanced Armature Driver Technology, Single High-End Frequencies Driver, Dual Mid-Low Frequencies Drivers with Integrated Passive Crossover.
- The UE5 Pro With Dual Balanced Armature Drivers, Single High-End Frequencies Driver, Single Mid-Low Frequencies Driver with integrated Passive Crossover
- The UE4 Pro with Dual balanced armature drivers, single high-end frequencies driver, single mid-low frequencies driver with an integrated passive crossover network.
- The UE1 Pro with single ear design, Quadruple balanced armature drivers, with Four-way integrated Passive Crossover.

=== Legacy custom products ===
- The UE10 Pro with Triple Balanced Armature Driver Technology, Single High-End Frequencies Driver, Dual Mid-Low Frequencies Drivers with Integrated Passive Crossover Circuit Board.

=== Musician's earplugs ===
Ultimate Ears has always offered earplugs for professional musicians. The earplugs are marketed relative to the amount of background noise reduction.

=== Mobile Apps ===
- BOOM & MEGABOOM / UE ROLL / BLAST & MEGABLAST (Speaker Apps, Separate Apps For Headphones)
- All BOOM, BLAST & ROLL Speakers (Excluding WONDERBOOM Series)
