= Sound Devices =

American audio and video equipment manufacturer

Sound Devices LLC
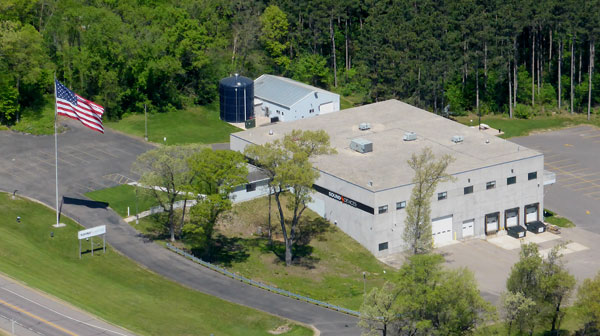
- Industry: Professional audio and video equipment
- Founded: 1998; 28 years ago
- Headquarters: Reedsburg, Wisconsin, United States
- Area served: Worldwide
- Website: www.sounddevices.com

Sound Devices LLC is an American company headquartered in Reedsburg, Wisconsin, with additional offices in Madison, Wisconsin and Rickmansworth, UK. Sound Devices designs and manufactures professional audio and video equipment.

== History ==
The company was founded in 1998 by Matt Anderson, Jon Tatooles, Jim Koomar, and Brad Lovett who previously worked for Shure. The company specializes in portable equipment for location sound and video recording.

Sound Devices products have been used for many well-known films, including Birdman and Batman: The Dark Knight, and TV shows, including Doctor Who and Breaking Bad.

In 2018 Sound Devices announced the acquisition of Audio Limited, a UK manufacturer of wireless microphone systems.

In October, 2021, Sound Devices was acquired by the Audiotonix Group.

== Awards ==
Audio Products

- Multi-winner of the Cinema Audio Society Technical Achievement Award - 744T, 788T, 664, 633, 970, SL-6, MixPre-10T (2018), and Scorpio (2019)
- NAMM Tec Award nominee in Outstanding Technical Achievement category (2014) - 970 recorder
- Resolution Magazine Award (2009) - 788T recorder

Video Products

- 2014 SVC Innovative Product Award (2014) - PIX 270i
- Videomaker Best Products Award (2014) for Best Field Mixer - PIX 240i
