= In-ear monitor =

Audio earpiece commonly used in live music and television

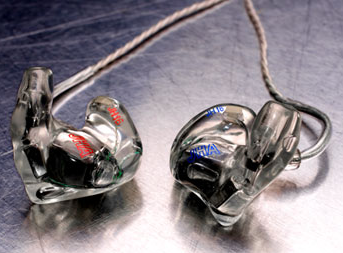
JH Audio JH16 Pro IEMs, with a custom-molded hard acrylic shell

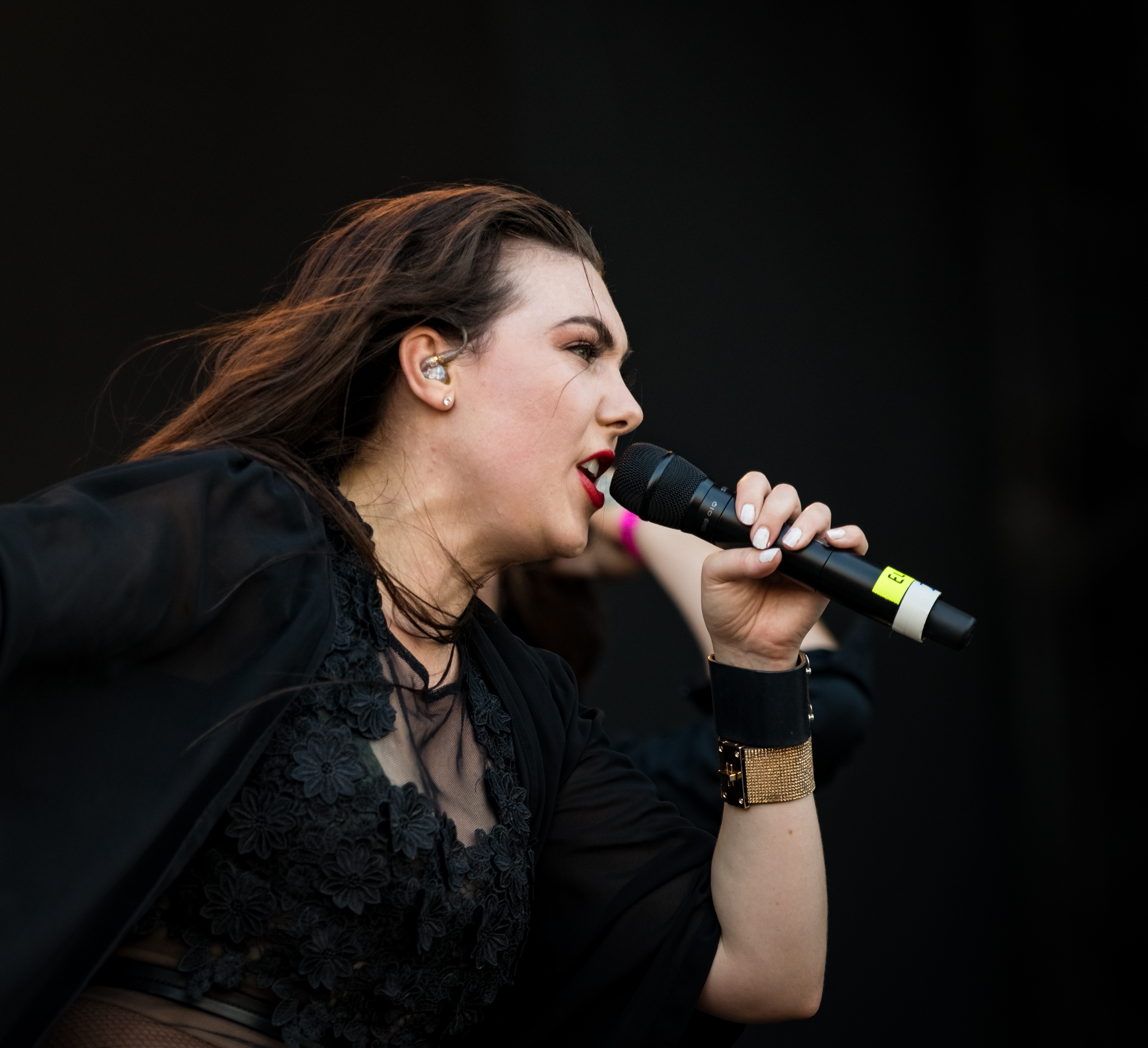
Elize Ryd wearing in-ear monitors during a concert in 2018

An in-ear monitor (IEMs), in-ear, or colloquially earpiece is a listening device placed into the ear. More narrowly, the term in-ear monitor is defined as such a device used by musicians, audio engineers and audiophiles to listen to music or to hear a personal mix of vocals and stage instrumentation for live performance or recording studio mixing, often specifically in order to hear themselves through a sound system in real time. They are also used by television presenters to receive vocal instructions, information and breaking news announcements from a producer that only the presenter hears. They are often custom-fitted to an individual's ears to provide maximum comfort and a high level of noise reduction from ambient surroundings. Their origins as a tool in live music performance can be traced back to the mid-1980s.

A stage monitor system is any system that provides a mix of audio sources to a performer on stage. Traditionally, loudspeakers, called floor wedges, were placed on the stage directed toward the performers. These loudspeakers can have disadvantages. First, floor wedges greatly increase the onstage volume, in some cases to levels that could potentially damage hearing. Second, while floor wedges can be placed in front of a particular singer, guitarist, bassist, or drummer, the sound can spill, muddying the sound on stage. In a sophisticated monitoring system, every band member can have their own monitor mix, which is their particular preference of vocals or instruments.

Since performers wear an IEM in each ear, they can also hear a stereo mix if a particular monitor system allows it. This can allow the additional definition of the audio by panning different elements (vocals, drums, etc.) to each ear. More recent advances allow the user to adjust the amount of ambient noise filtered by the IEM.

One additional consideration for mixing IEMs is that while eliminating floor wedges can improve the overall clarity of the mix for the performers and decrease the overall volume onstage, one important piece that is often lost is crowd noise and crowd comments, such as the audience calling for an encore. It is not uncommon for a microphone to be placed near each side of the stage, facing the audience, to provide a method to capture some of the crowd noise and audience comments back into the performers' IEM mixes. Larger live shows can have several microphones for this purpose spread across the front of the stage, which can also be sent to a multitrack recording device used in an outside broadcast production truck, or other destinations.

== Transmitter and receiver ==
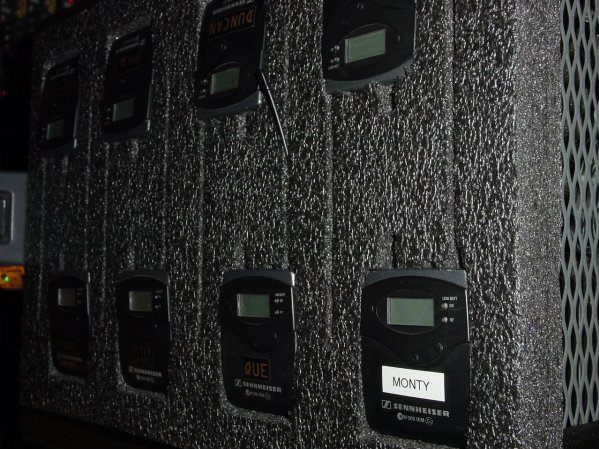
A case of in ear monitor receivers

Most professional stage in-ear monitor systems use wireless technology to send the mix to the IEMs. This type of system consists of a stationary offstage transmitter and an onstage receiver (about the size of a deck of cards) that is worn by the performer. There is generally a transmitter for each monitor mix, and there is always a receiver for each IEM. The transmitters usually output either one stereo mix or two mono mixes. When the transmitters are set up for two mono mixes, one transmitter can be used for two different mixes. Any number of receivers can receive a single mix.

The transmitters and receivers transfer audio wirelessly via a VHF or UHF radio frequencies. Generally speaking, UHF systems sound much better than VHF systems and are more expensive. UHF systems usually are less susceptible to frequency interference, which adds to their level of quality.

== Earpieces ==
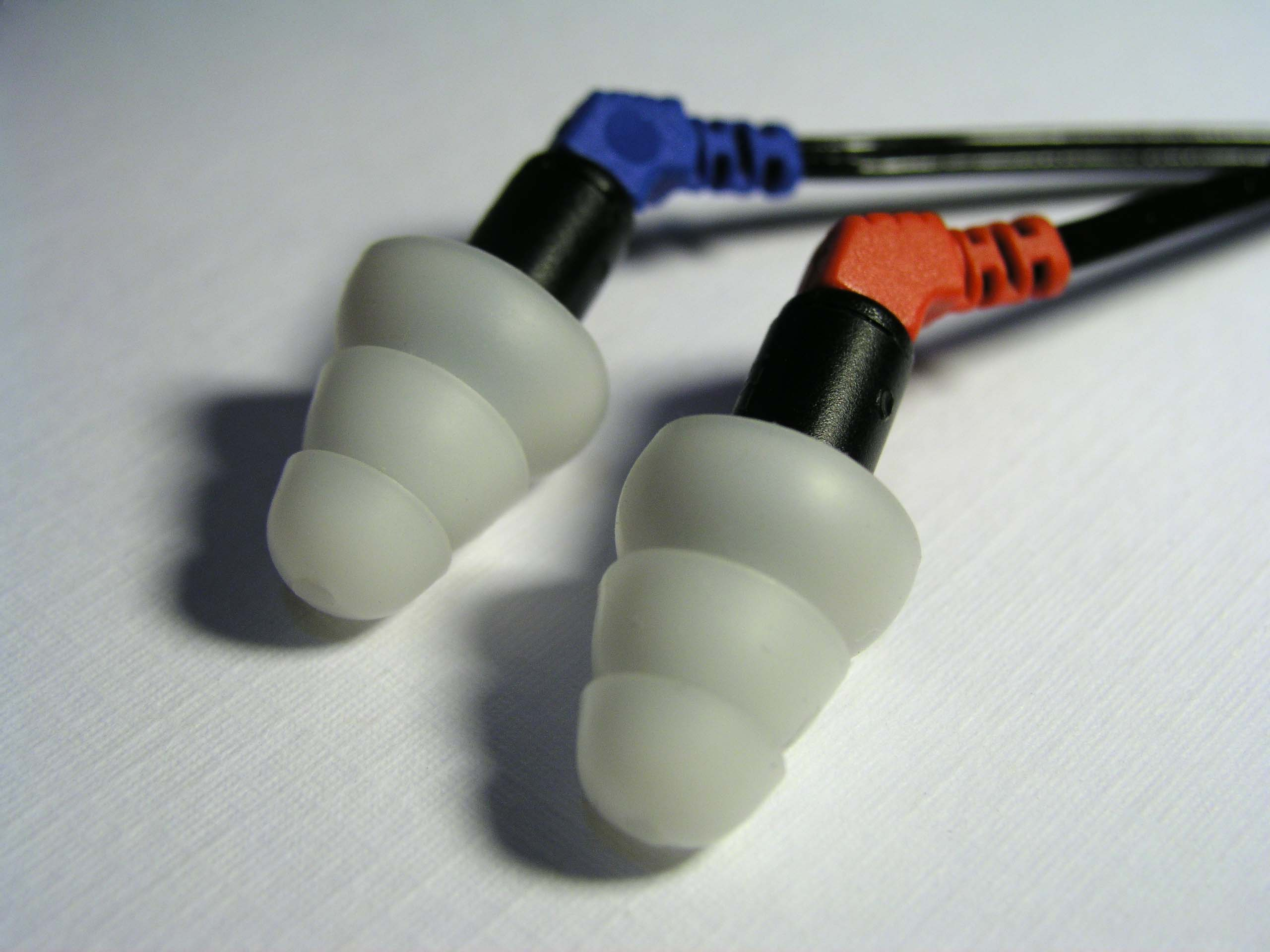
A pair of universal IEM earpieces (Etymotic ER-4S)

The in-ear monitors themselves are the last stage of the signal path in the system. They are placed in the external ear canal and seal against its sides; the effectiveness of this seal is a major part of the effectiveness of the IEM.

Universal IEMs typically include a variety of foam and silicone tips in each pack, with the goal that one pair may create a comfortable seal for the user's ears. If a universal IEM earpiece does not fit a specific person, they may need to order custom in-ear monitors. If there is not a good seal, ambient noise leakage is increased.

Custom molded IEMs are more comfortable to wear and better isolate ambient noise. Depending on the quality of the fit and length of the canal portion of the earpiece, a custom fit in-ear monitor will generally provide somewhere between 25 and 34 decibels of noise reduction. This means that loud onstage instruments, such as drum kit or large 8x12" guitar stacks, are less likely to cause hearing damage for onstage musicians wearing IEMs.

Custom in-ear monitors come in a variety of colors but are usually clear or a color that closely matches the skin color of the performer. Some manufacturers can also place custom artwork directly on the custom in-ear monitors. The IEM cable plugs into a 3.5 mm stereo jack on the receiver pack; typically clipped onto the belt, guitar strap, clothing of the performer, or placed in a pocket. Impressions for custom in-ear monitors are typically taken by an audiologist. To achieve maximum isolation, the audiologist should use a high-viscosity impression material with a deep impression of the ear canal. The musician should also mimic their embouchure while the impression material is setting, so that the fit is comfortable while performing. Custom in-ear monitors made of a softer silicone material can be inserted deeper in the ear canal and will provide more isolation from outside noise.

Some performers desire a more natural sound from their IEMs with both the music mix and ambient sounds. Passive ambient IEMs have a small hole drilled into the earpiece to allow some natural ambient sound into the ear canal. This can potentially lead to increased sound exposure as it reduces the signal-to-noise ratio for the mix and causes the musician to increase the levels from the IEM. Active ambient IEMs use external microphones to reproduce the ambient sound in the mix that mimics the frequency response of the open ear and may sound more natural to the performer.

Television studios use earpieces with a specialized type of intercom called an interruptible foldback (IFB), as a means of communication.

== Driver technology ==
=== Balanced armature ===
Originally invented for hearing aids, balanced armature drivers are nowadays used extensively in modern in-ear monitors. In-ear monitors can function with as few as one balanced armature driver, but some of the top models of in-ear monitors can carry as many as 18 balanced armature drivers for faster response, higher dynamic range, and more detailed sound. Notable examples include the Ultimate Ears Pro UE LIVE (6 balanced armature drivers and 2 dynamic drivers), JH Audio's Layla (12 balanced armature drivers), Noble Audio's K10U (10 balanced armature drivers), and 64 Audio's A18t (18 balanced armature drivers).

=== Dynamic ===
The dynamic driver contains a diaphragm with a voice coil attached to it. When an electric current passes through, the voice coil vibrates between the two permanent magnets, resulting in the diaphragm moving and producing sound. Adherents of the dynamic driver cite better bass response.

=== Planar Magnetic ===
Planar magnetic drivers consist of a thin membrane-like diaphragm lined with a conductive material sandwiched between two permanent magnets. Similar to dynamic drivers, electric current is passed through the magnets, causing the diaphragm to produce sound. The large diaphragm allows for high clarity and detail across a wide frequency range with low distortion. Despite early IEMs exhibiting common weaknesses of planar magnetic drivers, such as their size and high price, innovations in planar magnetic drivers now allow for newer IEMs that are both smaller and more affordable.

=== Electrostatic ===
Electrostatic drivers consist of a thin diaphragm between two metal plates (stators) and contain no moving parts. Sound is emitted as the alternating flow of static electricity vibrates the suspended diaphragm. Electrostatic in-ear monitors are rare as they are more expensive to manufacture and require a signal amplifier to function. Examples include the STAX SR-003MK2, Shure KSE1200 and KSE1500.

=== Electret ===
Functioning identically to electrostatic drivers, electret drivers are permanently charged, eliminating the need for an external amplifier. Electret drivers are commonly used as tweeters paired with other driver types as hybrid IEMs.

=== Hybrid ===
Hybrid in-ear monitors utilize a combination of different driver types. Common hybrids are made up of at least one balanced armature and dynamic drivers. This setup enables each driver to operate at its optimal audio frequency range (dynamic drivers for bass response and balanced armature drivers for middle and high frequencies).

== Wire ==
IEMs typically feature a wire-over-ear or wire (straight) down design. Wire down is easier to put in with one hand, making it more popular for casual use, where it may be inserted and removed multiple times per day. It can also be more comfortable, as wearing wire-over-ear with glasses may cause extra pressure and chafing behind the ears.

Wire-over-ear is preferred for professional use, providing a more discreet (run wire behind back, in shirt), secure fit (wire hooks onto ears) with reduced microphonics.

Some wires may come with MMCX connectors to allow replacement once worn out, to support add-ons like in-line microphone or Bluetooth connectivity or upgrading to cables of higher quality or different appearance.

== Safety ==
Many performers choose to use IEMs as a way to reduce their overall exposure to loud sound and prevent hearing loss. However, education on the use of IEMs is a crucial factor for limiting exposure, as performers have a tendency to set their IEMs to similar intensity levels that were previously used in their floor monitors. Musicians need to train themselves to listen at lower levels to take full advantage of the sound level reduction capability of IEMs.

Some musicians with two IEMs may choose to take out one of them during a performance to hear more ambient sound. The increased risk of hearing damage in this scenario is twofold. Removing one IEM negates the improvement in signal-to-noise ratio from isolation and the binaural summation effect, which causes an increase in perceived loudness from using two sound sources. Therefore, the performer will likely turn up the IEM in the other ear to improve the signal-to-noise ratio. Also, the ear without an IEM is potentially exposed to loud ambient sound.

Many IEMS use peak limiters or compressors to limit potential damage from sudden loud sounds. However, this does not prevent the performer from turning up the IEM to unsafe levels.

== See also ==
- Headphones § In-ear headphones
- MMCX connector
- Studio monitor
