= Allen & Heath =

English company specializing in audio equipment

- Type: Subsidiary
- Industry: Electronics
- Founded: 1968; 58 years ago
- Headquarters: Penryn, Cornwall, England
- Products: Headphones; Mixing consoles
- Parent: Audiotonix
- Website: www.allen-heath.com

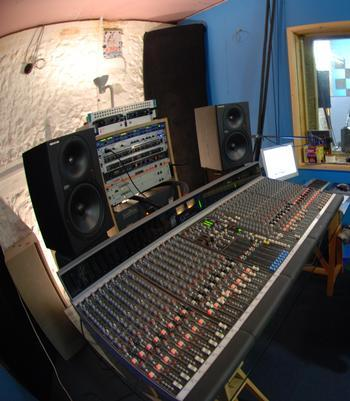
Allen & Heath GS3000 in the control room

Allen & Heath (also known as AH or A&H) is a company based in Penryn, Cornwall, England, specialising in the manufacture of audio mixing consoles. Allen & Heath also makes sound management systems for industrial installations and DJ mixers for nightclubs.

Allen & Heath is part of the Audiotonix Group.

== History ==
The company was founded in 1968 by Andy Bereza and Stephen Batiste, with subsequent involvement by Ivor Taylor and Andrew Stirling.

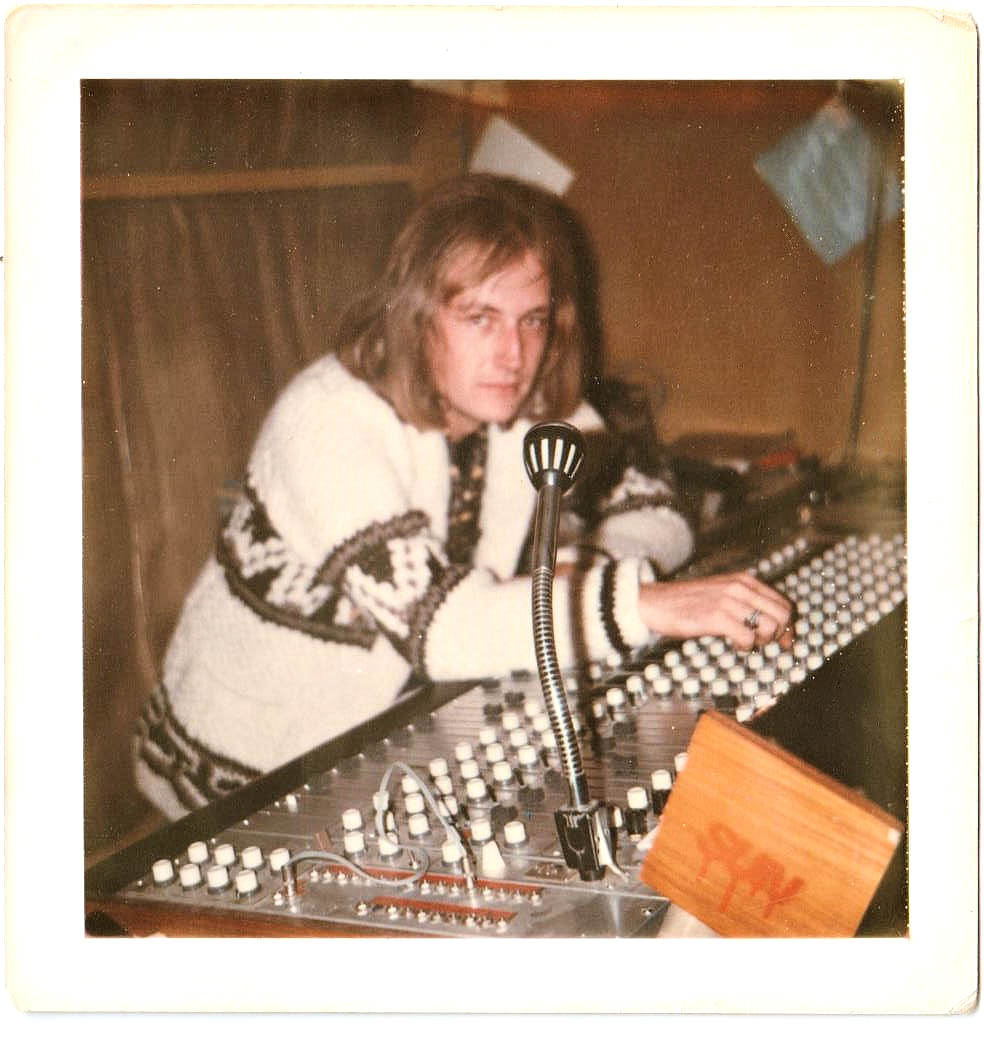
Rob Boughton using the first Allen and Heath multitrack desk

In the early 1970s Allen & Heath built custom quadraphonic mixing consoles for the bands The Who, used in live performance and in the studio mixing of the album "Quadrophenia" and Pink Floyd, the MOD1, which was used by Alan Parsons to mix their live performances. The MOD1 can be seen in their movie "Live at Pompeii".

Allen & Heath was acquired by Harman International in 1991. By 2001 the manufacturer's turnover had increased tenfold.

In July 2001 there was a management buyout of the company with investment coming from 3i and Bank of Scotland. The board consisted of the four then-current directors, plus two non-executive directors from its investment partners.

In March 2006 Close Growth Capital brought 3i's share for £9m in a secondary buyout. The company then employed 180 people with a turnover of £15 million.

In April 2008, A&H was sold to D&M Holdings Inc.

In June 2013, D&M Holdings sold Allen & Heath to private equity firm, Electra Partners. £43 million of equity and debt was provided by Electra Private Equity PLC and Allen & Heath's management.

== Product lineup ==
=== dLive ===
The dLive series of consoles are designed for professional touring and broadcast uses. They are used by many engineers in the industry due to its high expandability and features. There are two classes of dLive: C class, and S Class. The C class being more compact. The dLive surface requires the use of the Allen & Heath's proprietary MixRack external rack-mounted mixer engine which also provides some input/output functionality. It also supports Allen and Heath's digital snake system, providing high-quality audio over Ethernet.

=== Avantis ===
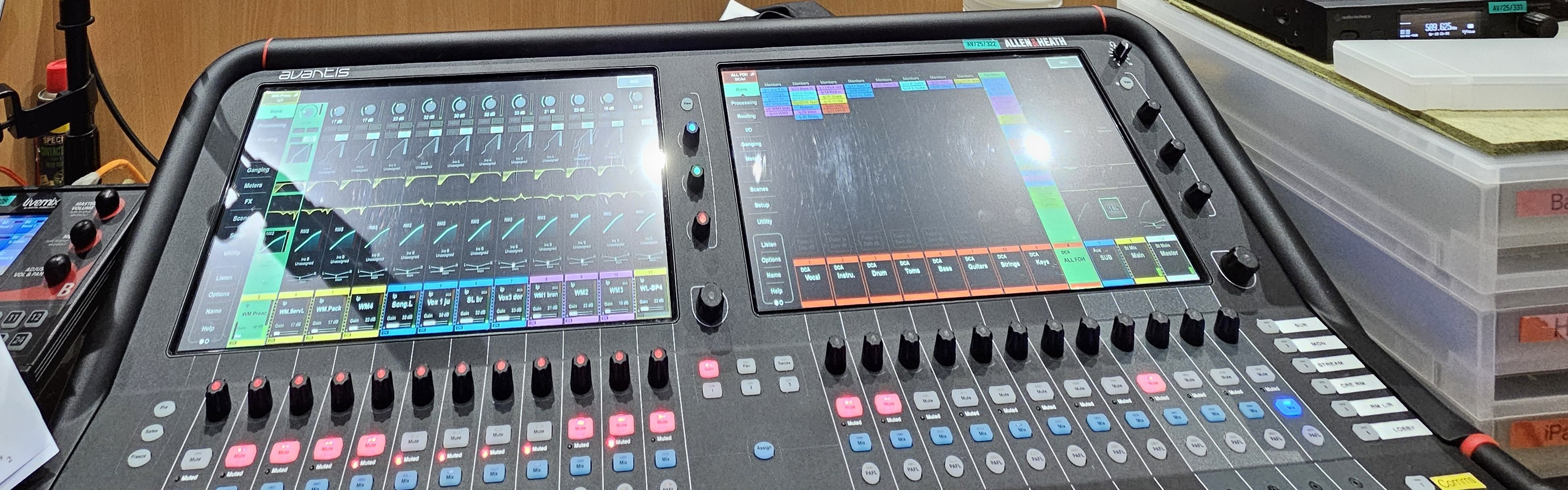
Allen & Heath 'Avantis' mixer found in a Presbyterian Church in Singapore

The Avantis is a console that sits between the dLive and SQ systems. With many of the facilities of the dLive it differs in the fact the surface itself contains the mix engine and thus does not require the use of the external MixRack. It supports the Allen and Heath digital snake system as per the dLive.

=== SQ ===
The SQ line is a step up from the previous (Qu) generation of mixers. It does not require an Allen & Heath MixRack due to the mixer engine being internal. It does support Allen and Heath digital snake system as per the dLive. The Allen & Heath SQ series consists of three main console sizes. They all share identical 96kHz processing engines, features, and channel counts (48 channels), differing only in physical size, local I/O, and fader counts.

- SQ-5

Faders: 17 (16 + 1 master fader) Local Mic Preamps: 16 XLR inputs

Form Factor: Compact and rack-mountable (with optional rack ears)

- SQ-6

Faders: 25 (24 + 1 master fader)

Local Mic Preamps: 24 XLR inputs

Form Factor: Mid-sized desktop console

- SQ-7

Faders: 33 (32 + 1 master fader)

Local Mic Preamps: 32 XLR inputs

Form Factor: Large flagship desktop console with extra physical SoftKeys

=== Qu ===
The Qu series is a digital mixing system for recording and sound reinforcement. It is designed to be a convenient and intuitive system for engineers already familiar with analog equipment, making the introduction to digital mixing relatively easy. It supports wireless control and monitoring via several iOS and Android applications. In addition to Allen & Heath's own apps (Qu-Pad, Qu-You, Qu-Control, and Qu-MixPad), third-party applications and web-based interfaces can also be used for remote access and control. The consoles are also compatible with Allen & Heath's dSNAKE for digital audio over Ethernet.
