= Castle (company) =

Chinese, former British manufacturer of hi-fi loudspeakers

Castle (formerly known as Castle Acoustics) is a British loudspeaker brand, established in 1973.

Castle Acoustics takes its name and its logo from the historic Skipton Castle, the North Yorkshire market town of Skipton having been Castle's home from its foundation to 2006.

== History ==
In 1932 the former wool merchant Gilbert Briggs from Bradford formed The Wharfedale Wireless Company primarily to further the design and manufacture of loudspeakers to reproduce as accurately as possible the music in which he was keenly interested. His legacy has over two generations passed to the Castle Acoustics of today.

Moving to Skipton in Craven (Airedale), located in an old woollen mill, Castle Acoustics was born on 3 September 1973.

Almost twenty years later, with the original founders approaching retiring age, a second group of senior executives from Wharfedale made a proposal to buy out the original management team.

Castle was rescued from bankruptcy by the International Audio Group (IAG) adding the brand to its portfolio which includes Wharfedale, QUAD, audiolab, Mission, Leak and Luxman.

During the mid to late 2000's, Castle found new success with manufacturing at IAG's self-owned manufacturing facility, in China with new models such as Castle Knight, Castle Avon and updated version of Castle Richmond IV, all winning critical acclaim.

In 2023, Castle announced the return to UK manufacturing with the Castle Windsor series of loudspeakers. Designed in collaboration with long-term Castle fan, Karl-Heinz Fink, Windsor heralds the re-emergence of the brand as 'Made in UK' loudspeaker brand.

== Sources ==
- Mejias, Stephen (23 May 2011). "Castle Richmond Anniversary featured at 2011 High End Show in Munich, Germany". Stereophile.
- "Castle Knight 2 Review featured in www.whathifi.com". What Hi Fi? Sound and Vision. February 2011.
- Todd, Dominic (8 September 2010). "Castle Knight 2 Review featured in www.techradar.com". Hi Fi Choice.
- Olenick, Doug (31 July 1995). "Castle Acoustics touts quality line". HFN The Weekly Newspaper for the Home Furnishing Network.
- Iverson, Jon; Willis, Barry (10 January 1999). "Consumer Electronics Show, January 10, 1999". Stereophile.
