= Honda Legend =

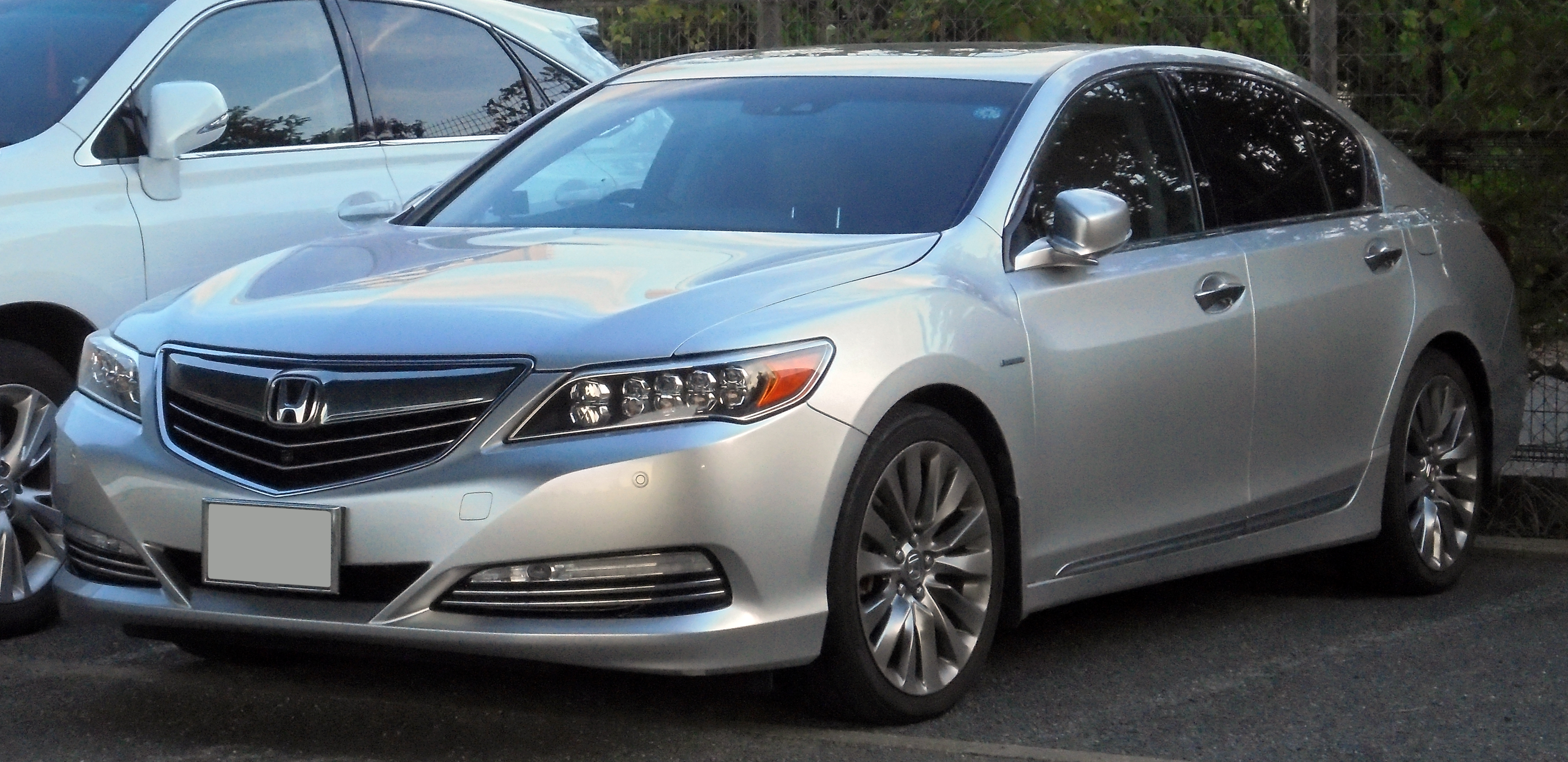

Overview
- Manufacturer: Honda
- Also called: Acura Legend (1986–1995); Daewoo Arcadia (1994–1999); Acura RL (1996–2012); Acura RLX (2014–2020)
- Production: 1985–2012; 2014–2021

Body and chassis
- Class: Executive car
- Body style: 4-door saloon 2-door coupé (1987–1995)
- Layout: Transverse front-engine, front-wheel-drive (KA1–6); Longitudinal front-engine, front-wheel-drive (KA7–9); Transverse front-engine, all-wheel-drive (SH-AWD; KB & KC)

The Honda Legend (ホンダ・レジェンド, Honda Rejendo) is a series of V6-engined executive cars that was produced by Honda between 1985 and 2021, and served as its flagship vehicle. The Legend has also been sold under the Acura Legend, RL and RLX nameplates — the successive flagship vehicles of Honda's luxury Acura division in North America from 1986 until 2020.

== First generation (KA1–6; 1985) ==
First generation (KA1–KA6)
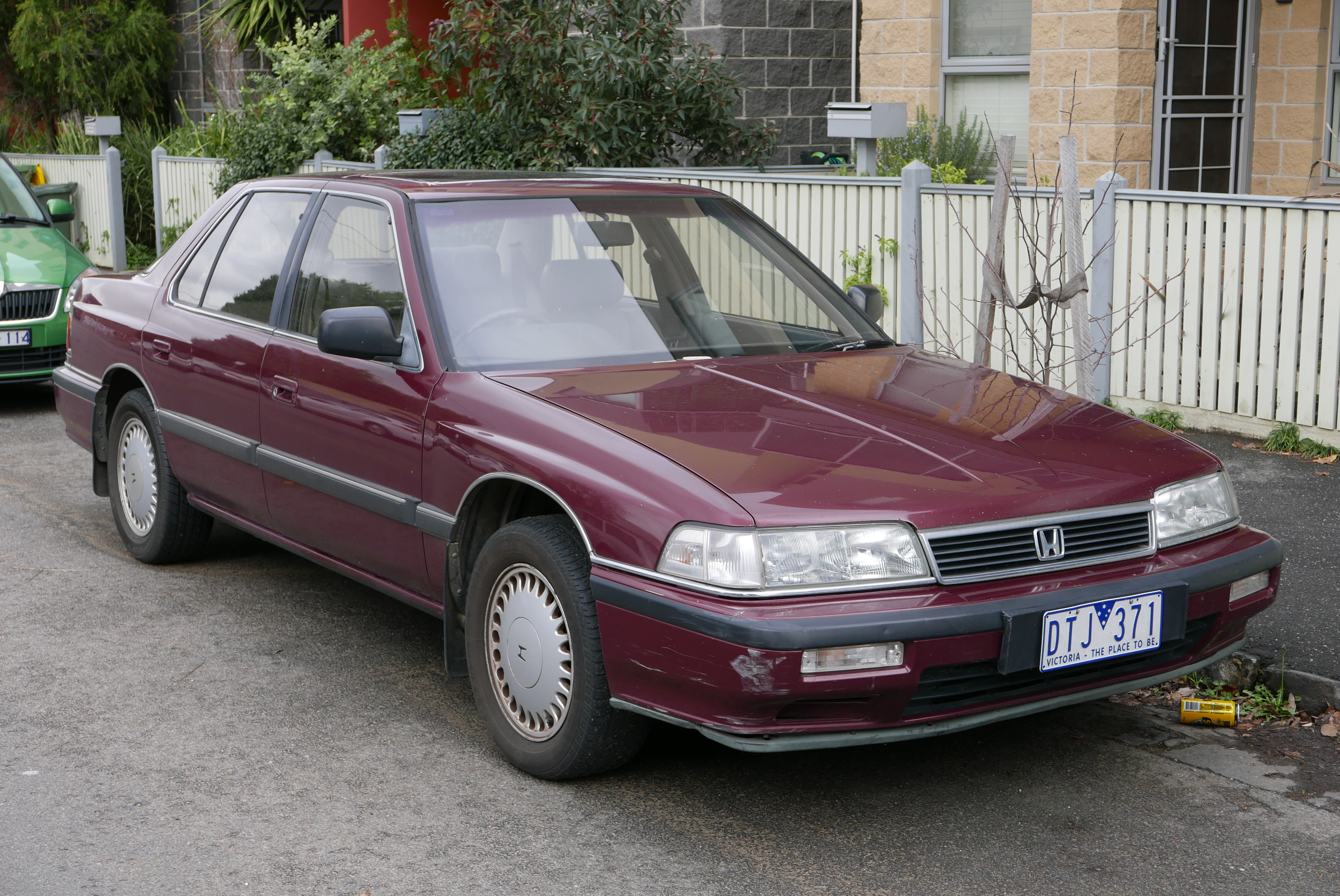

Overview
- Also called: Acura Legend
- Production: 1985–1990
- Assembly: Japan: Sayama, Saitama (Sayama Plant); United Kingdom: Cowley, Oxfordshire, England (HUKM: 1986–1988)
- Designer: Tetsuya Mizuno, Yukio Kurosu, Yoshio Ui (1982); Akio Koike (1987, refresh)

Body and chassis
- Body style: 4-door sedan 2-door coupé
- Layout: Front-engine, front-wheel-drive
- Related: Rover 800; Sterling

Powertrain
- Engine: 2.0 L C20A V6 (Japan); 2.0 L C20AT turbo V6 (Japan); 2.5 L C25A V6; 2.7 L C27A V6
- Transmission: 5-speed manual 4-speed automatic

Dimensions
- Wheelbase: Sedan: 2,760 mm (108.7 in); Coupe: 2,705 mm (106.5 in)
- Length: '86–'88 Sedan: 4,810 mm (189.4 in) '89–'90 Sedan: 4,841 mm (190.6 in); 2.0 Sedan: 4,690 mm (184.6 in); Coupe: 4,775.2 mm (188 in)
- Width: '86–'88 Sedan: 1,735 mm (68.3 in) '89–'90 Sedan: 1,750 mm (68.9 in); 2.0 Sedan: 1,690 mm (66.5 in); Coupe: 1,745 mm (68.7 in)
- Height: Sedan: 1,390 mm (54.7 in); Coupe: 1,369 mm (53.9 in)

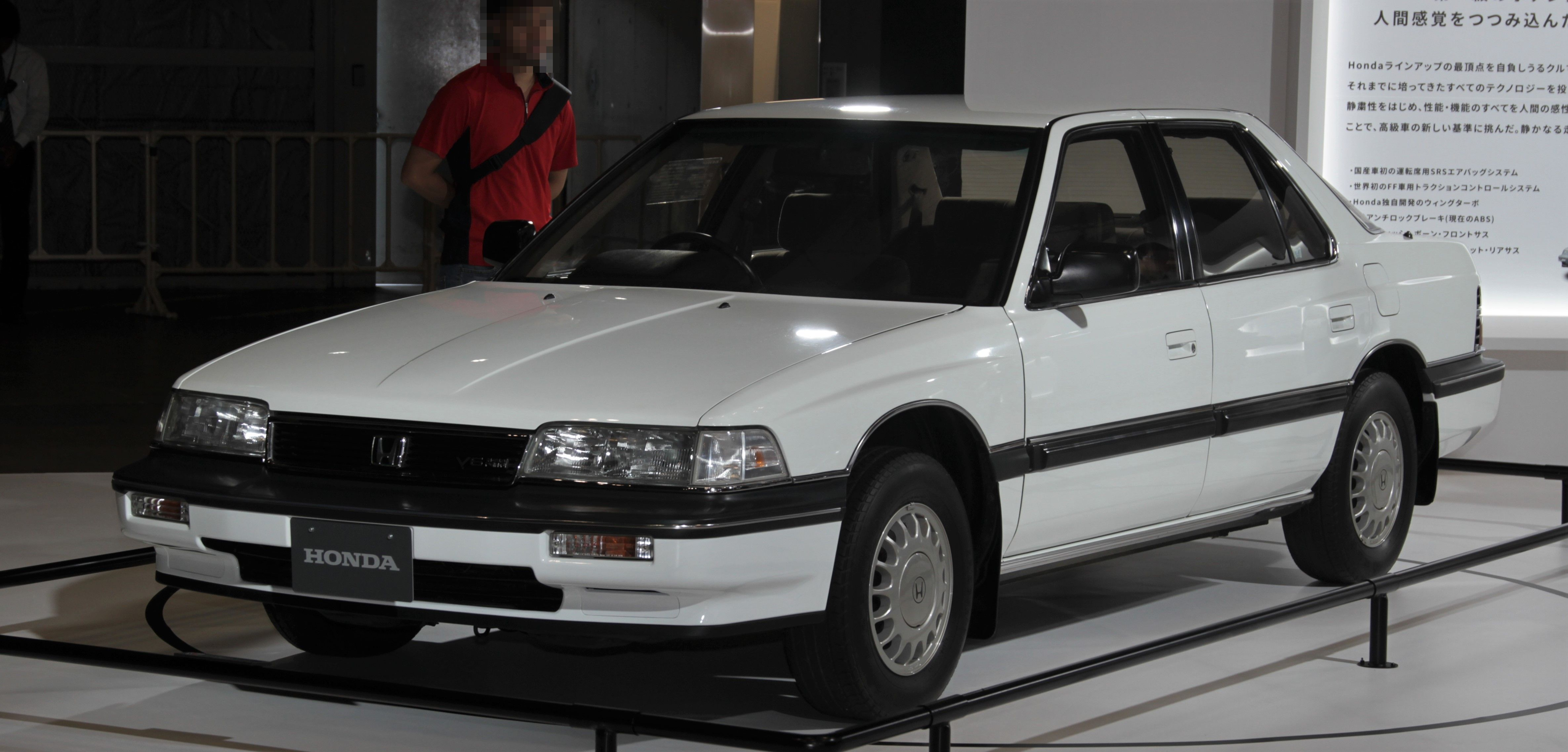
First generation Legend sedan

The first-generation Legend, introduced to Japan on October 22, 1985, was the first production Honda vehicle to offer only a SOHC V6 engine worldwide. The introduction of the Legend also coincided with the launch of a new dealership sales channel in Japan, called Honda Clio. The Legend was the result of a joint venture with Britain's Austin Rover Group called Project XX that started in November 1981 with the Austin Rover-Honda XX letter of intent signed by the two companies to replace the Rover SD1 and to provide a luxury vehicle for Honda, and was codenamed as HX. The Rover Company had a long-established reputation as a luxury car maker in the United Kingdom and Europe, demonstrated by the Rover P5 and Rover P6, and Honda wanted to introduce a luxury car for the Japanese, European and North American markets. Rover also wanted to return to the American market when previously they had reportedly sold only 1,500 cars in 1971, and a brief return in 1980, selling 800 Rover SD1s by offering the Sterling which was also a result of the ARG-Honda partnership. The development work was carried out at Rover's Canley, Coventry plant and Honda's Tochigi Prefecture development centre. Design work concluded on the Legend in 1982, with a design patent being filed on September 27, 1982, at the Japan Patent Office under application number 1982-043493 and registered on September 19, 1984, under patent number 0640105.

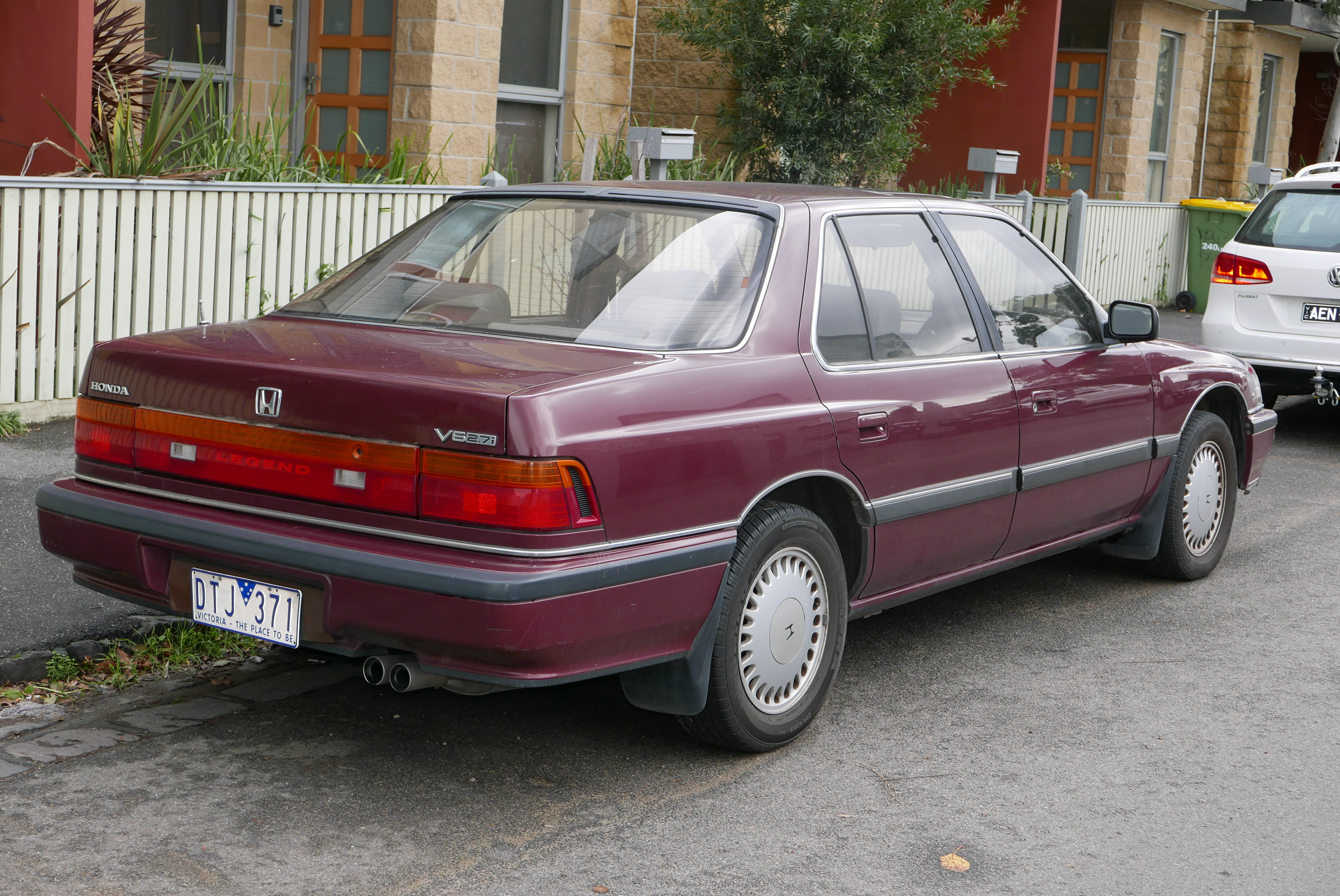
1989 Honda Legend sedan

Honda and British Leyland/Rover agreed that Legends would be built at Cowley for the British market. However, few UK built Legends passed Honda's quality control standards, and many simply ended up being used as in-plant transport. In the end, only 4,409 Legends were built in the UK, from 1986 until 1988. All US-market Legends were built in Japan.

=== Japanese market ===
Honda wanted to expand its model range above the Honda Accord, and offer a premium level sedan that would appeal to wealthy middle-aged customers who were the traditional buyers of the Toyota Crown, Mazda Luce and Nissan Cedric/Gloria. In 1981, Honda had introduced a luxury level version of the Accord, called the Honda Vigor, but realized that they needed to manufacture a larger, more exclusive sedan with similar dimensions to the Crown, Luce, Cedric and Gloria. When the Legend was introduced worldwide, the optional equipment list was minimal as commonly identified equipment regarded as luxury in nature was included as standard equipment, leaving the only option the choice between a manual or automatic transmission.

The major mechanical difference between the Legend and the Toyota, Mazda and Nissan sedans was that the Legend was front-wheel drive, which Honda stated was "quite simply the most logical means to the ends the engineers desired: a true luxury car with a low, aerodynamic hood; a spacious interior with a nearly flat floor, and the superior traction that results from placing the engine and drivetrain transversely over the drive wheels." This provided the Legend with a front-end heavy 63/37 front to rear weight distribution ratio, similar to the NSU Ro 80. The ride was engineered to appeal towards the luxury car market and not necessarily towards the performance market, and the front to rear weight distribution ratio reflected this goal. Efforts to minimize torque steer were achieved by the half shafts and the angles of the joints at the ends of those shafts being equalized, helping the Legend to accelerate in a straight line.

The Japanese-spec Legend was offered in three trim levels; the V6Xi with the 2.5 L C25A V6 engine, with the slightly shorter and narrower V6Gi and V6Zi using the 2.0 L C20A V6. The V6Gi had the same level of equipment and luxury features as the V6Xi, whereas the V6Zi had reduced content and a lower price. The V6 engines were available with electronic, multi-port sequential fuel injection Honda called Programmed Fuel Injection, or PGM-FI and a variable length intake manifold on the smaller 2.0-liter V6. The larger 2.5 engine was upgraded to the C27A 2.7 liters of displacement for model year 1988 and added a variable length intake manifold. The engine benefited from Honda's successes with its endeavors in Formula One racing in 1964, and Honda's F1 racing car, the Honda RA271. Transmission selections were either a four-speed automatic transaxle with a computer controlled lockup torque converter, or a five-speed manual transaxle.

In order for the sedan to comply with Japanese vehicle size requirements and reduced tax liability, the car with the 2.0 L V6 was slightly shorter and narrower for Japanese buyers by reducing the extension of the front and rear bumper covers, and reducing the overall width to 1,695 mm (66.7 in). This also offered an alternative to the traditional Crown and Cedric/Gloria customer base due to the sedan being in the smaller size classification and reduced tax liability but with a comparable level of luxury equipment found in the larger cars, and the same amount of interior space due to the front-wheel drive powertrain, with a wheelbase advantage of 30 mm (1.2 in) over the Cedric/Gloria and Crown. To address the issue of durability, the Legend was manufactured as a pillared sedan instead of a four-door hardtop, a body style still offered at the time by Toyota and Nissan on the Crown and Cedric/Gloria. The slightly smaller body style also allowed the Legend to compete with the upscale Toyota Cresta and Chaser and the Nissan Laurel.

The Legend offered many Honda "firsts", such as a driver side airbag, vehicle speed sensitive power assist rack and pinon steering, anti-lock brakes, seat belt pre-tensioners with Emergency Locking Retractors (called E.L.R.), a choice of 100% wool or cloth moquette upholstery, and "TCS" Traction control, the first front-wheel drive car to use traction control. Attention was given to make sure the Legend was quiet, so Honda used computer simulation using NASTRAN, a stress analysis program created by NASA, helping the car achieve a drag coefficient of 0.32 and an interior noise level of 63 dB (measured while the vehicle was travelling at 100 km/h (62.1 mph) using a manual transmission in 5th gear), and by using triple seals around the tops of door openings.

The Legend was introduced with a double wishbone suspension for the front wheels, and a modified Chapman strut with trailing arm rear suspension Honda called "RF (Reduced Friction) Strut Rear Suspension" with progressive rate rear coil springs that stiffen as they compress to combine smooth ride and good handling. The rear coil spring was separate from the strut and positioned so that vertical pressure was supported by the lower control arm. The term Reduced Friction referred to the minimizing of forces that create friction in the shock absorbers, providing more efficient damping for the full suspension stroke. The rear suspension was upgraded to double wishbone starting in 1987 for the coupe and late 1988 for the sedan.

Notable owners of the first generation Legend were Soichiro Honda the founder of Honda, Satoru Nakajima, Tyrrell Racing F1 driver in 1990, and Ayrton Senna. The Legend V6Xi was used as the pace car for the Suzuka Circuit for 1986.

==== "Wing Turbo" version ====
In October 1988, Honda upgraded the C20A V6 engine used exclusively in the KA5 series Legend with a variable geometry turbocharger, calling it the "Wing Turbo" in a Japanese TV commercial to address the modest power available from the previous engine with variable length intake manifold used in earlier models. The turbocharger turbine housing had four vanes made from heat resistant Inconel alloy surrounding the turbine wheel (on the inlet side of it) that would fluctuate based on engine load and transmission gearing above 2,000 rpm to allow for increased airflow into the engine as needed. The turbo compressor could generate as much as 450 millimetres of mercury (8.7 psi) of boost, and was paired with a water cooled intercooler installed inside the intake plenum between the cylinder banks to produce 140 kW (190 PS; 188 bhp) net at 6000 rpm and a maximum torque of 24.6 kg⋅m (241 N⋅m; 178 lb⋅ft) at 3,500 rpm. The turbo was installed not necessarily to make the engine more powerful, but rather to increase fuel efficiency and reduce emissions, as the Japanese pay a tax on the amount of emissions the car produces.

According to an excerpt of Automotive Engineering in January 1989, "The movable wings are positive pressure- and vacuum-operated, their angle changes are controlled by an eight-bit 36-kilobyte computer that also manages fuel injection. Positive pressure to the wing actuator is supplied by the turbo's supercharge pressure, controlled by a frequency solenoid valve, and negative pressure is generated by intake vacuum and accumulated in a reservoir which is also solenoid controlled. The CPU is fed signals including boost pressure, intake temperature, coolant temperature, throttle opening, engine rpm, and vehicle speed. The Wing Turbo is not fitted with a conventional wastegate.

On idling and steady-state cruising that do not require supercharging, the movable flags—or wings—which are fully opened, allow exhaust gas to enter the enlarged nozzle area and pass through the turbine smoothly with little resistance. At the beginning of full acceleration, the wings close fully, reducing the nozzle area through which accelerated gas enters and strikes the turbine blades forcefully, gaining boost quickly. When maximum boost is obtained, the movable wings begin to close gradually, until the vehicle reaches a desired cruising velocity whereby the wings open fully. The nozzle area varies continuously according to operating and load conditions."

The turbo was installed just above the automatic transmission unit; a manual transmission was not offered. This engine was only offered in Japan using the more compact sedan body style, labeled as "2.0 Ti Exclusive" and "2.0 Ti". The engine was used for just two years, due to the introduction of the second generation Legend in 1990 with the much larger C32A V6, and as such Wing Turbo sedans are extremely rare. Much of the research on this engine contributed to the VTEC C30A V6 engine used in the 1990 Honda NSX. The Legend Turbo can be identified as by a "TURBO" badge attached to the front grille on the bottom right hand side and a "V6Ti" rear badge.

=== European market ===
The Honda Legend was introduced for the 1987 model year and was virtually identical in equipment offered and vehicle dimensions to the North American model, with one trim designation called the V6-2.5i. This means very few options were available other than the choice of transmission, and an air conditioning system identical to the North American version. The Europeans were offered an optional "Special Equipment Pack" that offered cruise control, aluminium alloy wheels, a driver's seat with power lumbar support, height, fore/aft and reclining adjusters, adjustable rear headrests, a 4-speaker stereo system provided by Philips and headlight wipers. Front and rear mud flaps were standard in undisclosed countries but not all. The radio volume control rocker switch and preset radio scan button installed on the instrument binnacle was not offered.

=== Legend coupe and other changes ===
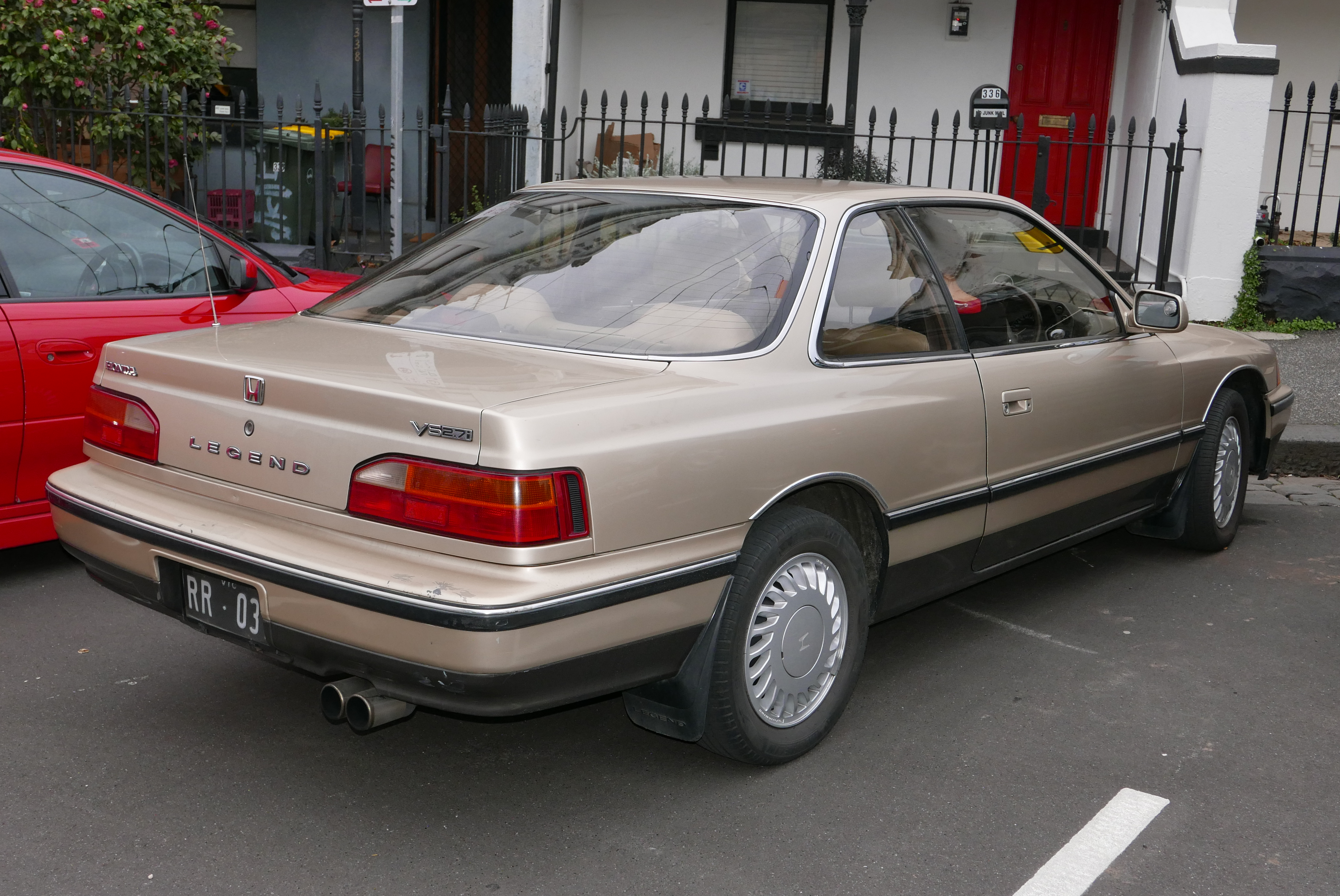
Honda Legend coupe (Australia)

The Legend Coupe was introduced February 6, 1987, with a larger displacement 2.7-liter V6 engine featuring a variable intake system for increased torque and a rear double wishbone suspension which wasn't available on the sedan until 1989 model year. Incidentally, the Japanese coupe was both longer and wider, which increased its tax liability, yet it had a shorter wheelbase by 2.2 in (56 mm).

Starting with the introduction of the 1988 model year, the trim level "Exclusive" was introduced, offering genuine wood trim provided by Tendo Mokko on the dashboard and center console with a very large selection of available wood type and hues to choose from, automatic headlights, headlight washer/wipers, separate rear passenger climate control, and chrome-plated power folding mirrors and door handles with infrared remote keyless entry. October 14, 1988 saw a minor restyle offered for the interior and dashboard, to provide a more luxurious appearance in comparison to the Nissan and Toyota uplevel sedans the Legend was competing with. Due to the success Honda had with the Legend, it served as an inspiration for many vehicles from multiple manufacturers, including the Subaru Legacy with which it shares many visual resemblances and dimensions both inside and out.

=== Engine specifications ===
Engine	Displacement (cc) / bore×stroke	Horsepower	Torque
C20A V6 SOHC 24 valve PGM-FI	1996 cc / 82.0×63.0 mm	145 PS (107 kW; 143 hp) at 6300 rpm	172 N⋅m (127 lb⋅ft) at 5000 rpm
C20A turbo V6 SOHC 24 valve PGM-FI	1996 cc / 82.0×63.0 mm	190 PS (140 kW; 187 hp) at 6000 rpm	241 N⋅m (178 lb⋅ft) at 3500 rpm
C25A V6 SOHC 24 valve PGM-FI	2493 cc / 84.0×75.0 mm	165 PS (121 kW; 163 hp) at 6000 rpm	211 N⋅m (156 lb⋅ft) at 4500 rpm
C27A V6 SOHC 24 valve PGM-FI	2675 cc / 87.0×75.0 mm	180 PS (132 kW; 178 hp) at 6000 rpm	226 N⋅m (167 lb⋅ft) at 4500 rpm

== Second generation (KA7/8; 1990) ==
Second generation (KA7/KA8)
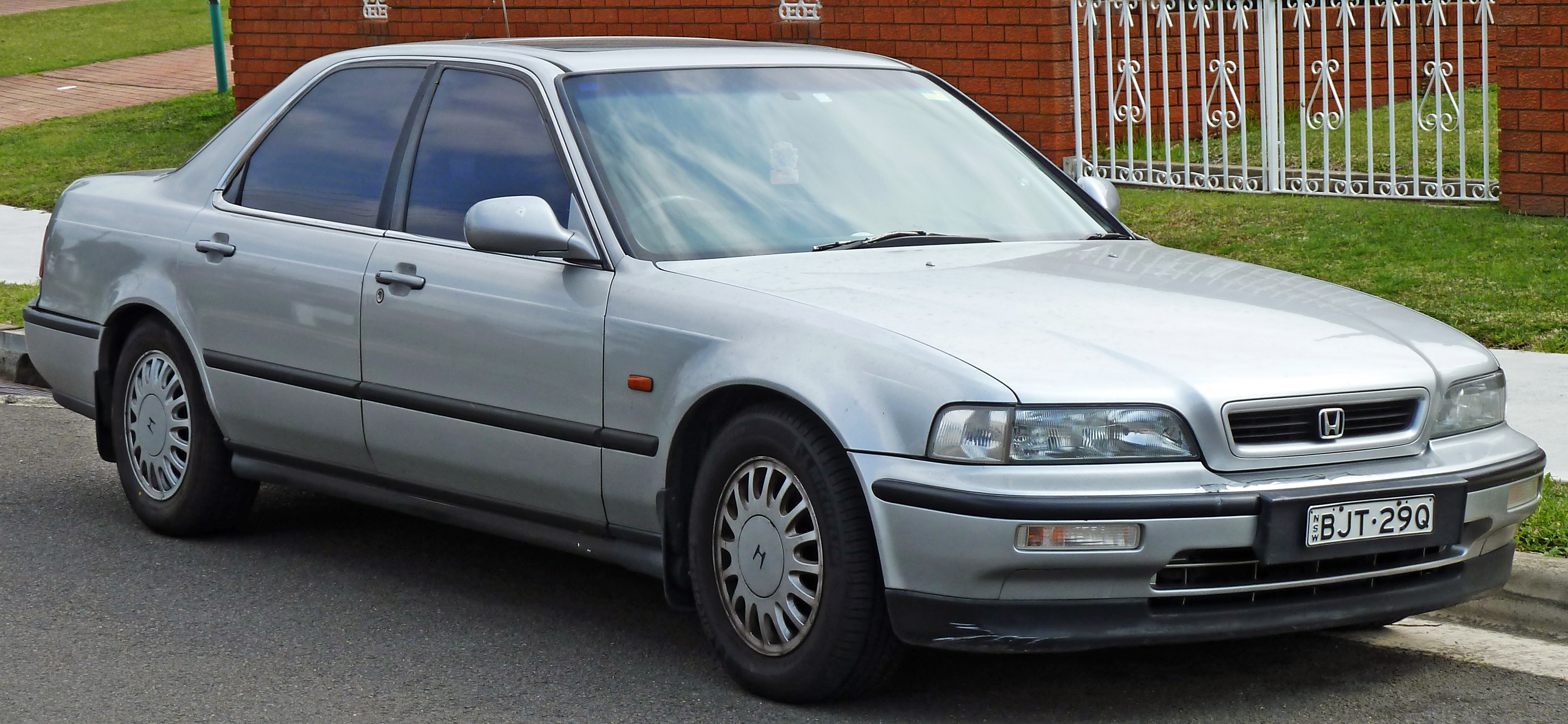

Overview
- Also called: Acura Legend; Daewoo Arcadia
- Production: 1990–1995
- Assembly: Japan: Sayama, Saitama (Sayama Plant)

Body and chassis
- Body style: 4-door sedan 2-door coupé
- Layout: Longitudinal front-engine, front-wheel-drive
- Related: Honda Accord; Honda Inspire; Honda Vigor; Honda Ascot

Powertrain
- Engine: 3.2 L C32A V6
- Transmission: 4-speed automatic 5-speed manual 6-speed manual

Dimensions
- Wheelbase: Sedan: 2,910 mm (114.6 in); Coupé: 2,830 mm (111.4 in)
- Length: Sedan: 4,940 mm (194.5 in); Coupé: 4,880 mm (192.1 in)
- Width: 1,810 mm (71.3 in)
- Height: Sedan: 1,405 mm (55.3 in); Coupé: 1,370 mm (53.9 in)

Chronology
- Predecessor: Daewoo Imperial (Daewoo Arcadia)
- Successor: Daewoo Magnus (Daewoo Arcadia)

The second generation model was introduced on October 24, 1990, and continued to offer both a sedan and coupé. The Rover 800 was not updated to the new platform, and instead continued with the old XX platform. In Japan, this Legend was also known as the "Super Legend" due to the much larger 3.2 C32A engine, which was now the only engine offered in the Legend. The Type I engine was rated at 215 PS (158 kW; 212 bhp), and the Type II was rated at 235 PS (173 kW; 232 bhp) and was included with the Touring system. This Legend benefited from much of the research and testing done for Honda's new mid-engined high performance sports car, the Honda NSX, and the Legend was used as a test platform for new NSX technologies and research. Honda mounted the engine longitudinally behind the front axle, for what they called a "front-wheel-drive midship" layout. Nonetheless, the 60/40 weight distribution was still heavily biased towards the front wheels. Honda introduced a passenger side airbag on this model, and used off-set collision testing to improve collision performance and safety.

Trim level designations were changed to α ("Alpha") for the top level vehicle, and β ("Beta") for the lower grade. No other trim levels were offered. The "Alpha" was very well equipped, offering ABS, leather or 100% wool moquette upholstery, projector beam headlights, and dual-zone air conditioning.

The customer base served by the slightly smaller first generation Legend was now offered the completely revised CB5 series Honda Vigor and Honda Inspire sold at two different Japanese Honda retail sales locations, Clio and Verno. The business practice of offering the previous generation Legend in two sizes so that it could comply with Japanese dimension and engine displacement regulations was ceded to the Inspire and Vigor, where both vehicles were offered in two versions so as to comply with the regulations, while offering Japanese buyers more choices. The installation of the larger 3.2-litre engine obligated Japanese buyers for higher amounts of annual road tax over the smaller engines in the previous generation.

The Japanese Domestic Market version of the 1990 Legend was the third Honda model offered with a navigation system (first and second being the 1981 Honda Accord and Vigor). The digital-based system used both a gyrocator and a map matching mechanism, allowing it to perform map matching even after the vehicle drove on a road not included in the map. It was not satellite-based and instead relied on a gas gyroscope (Inertial navigation system). September 29, 1992 saw an upgrade to the "Alpha" trim level, called the Touring Series, which added the Honda Progressive Damper suspension system, and included upgraded calipers for the front and rear disc brakes, and increased the wheel size to 16 inches. A Luxman premium sound system was added to the options list. The prefectural police department of Aomori used "Beta" sedans with the Type II engine for traffic monitoring.

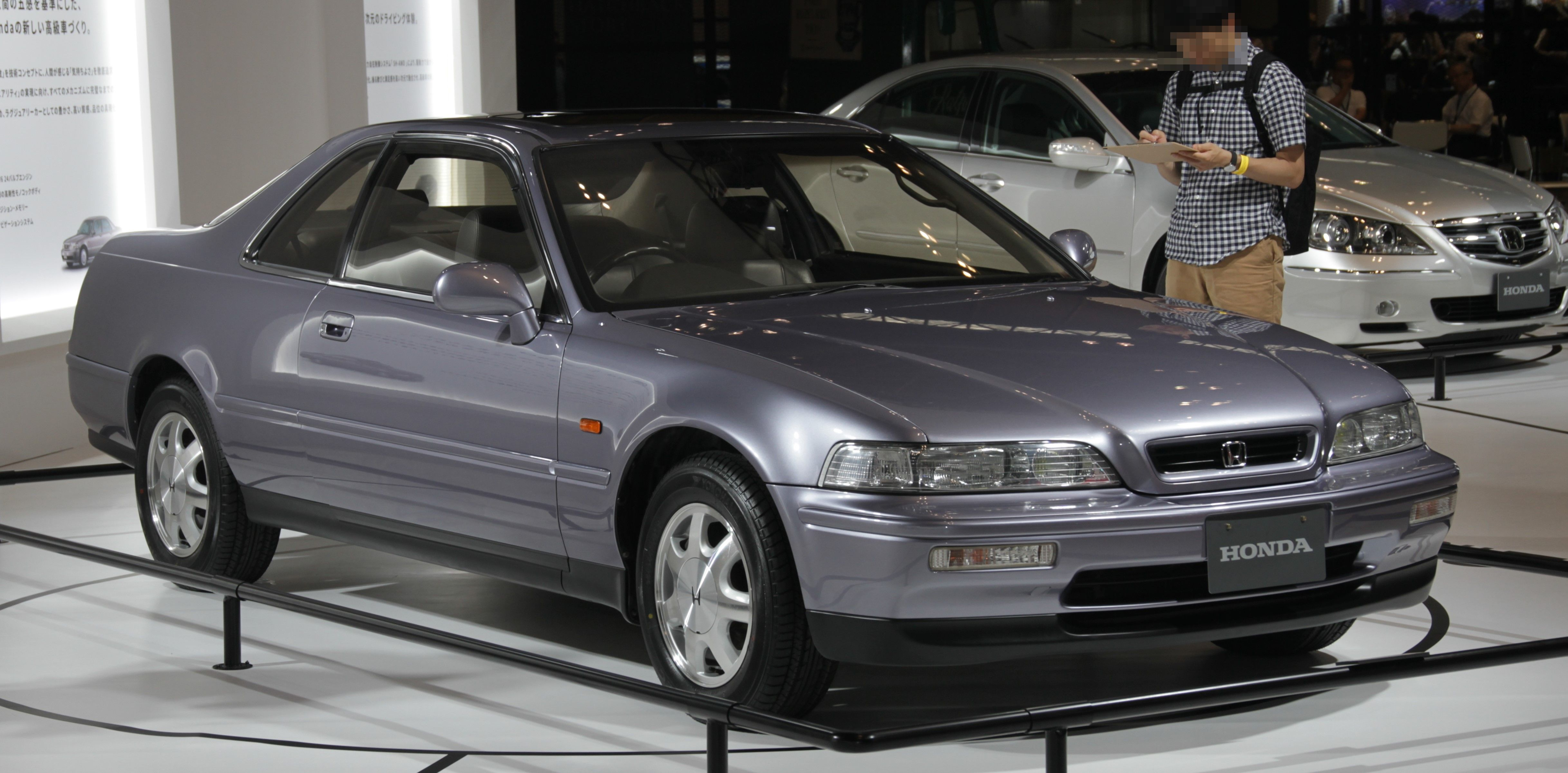
Honda Legend coupé (Japan)

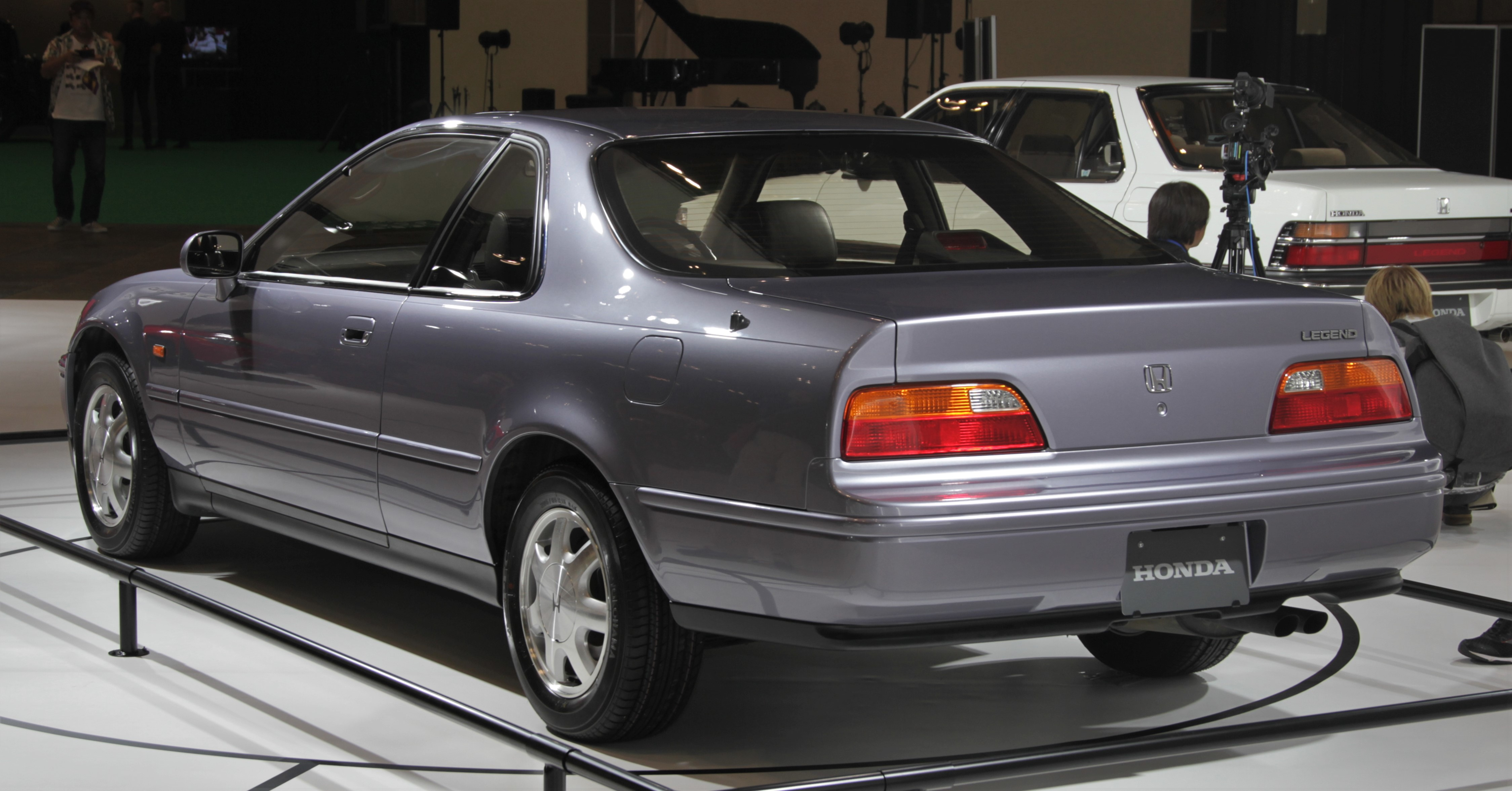
Honda Legend coupé (Japan; rear view)

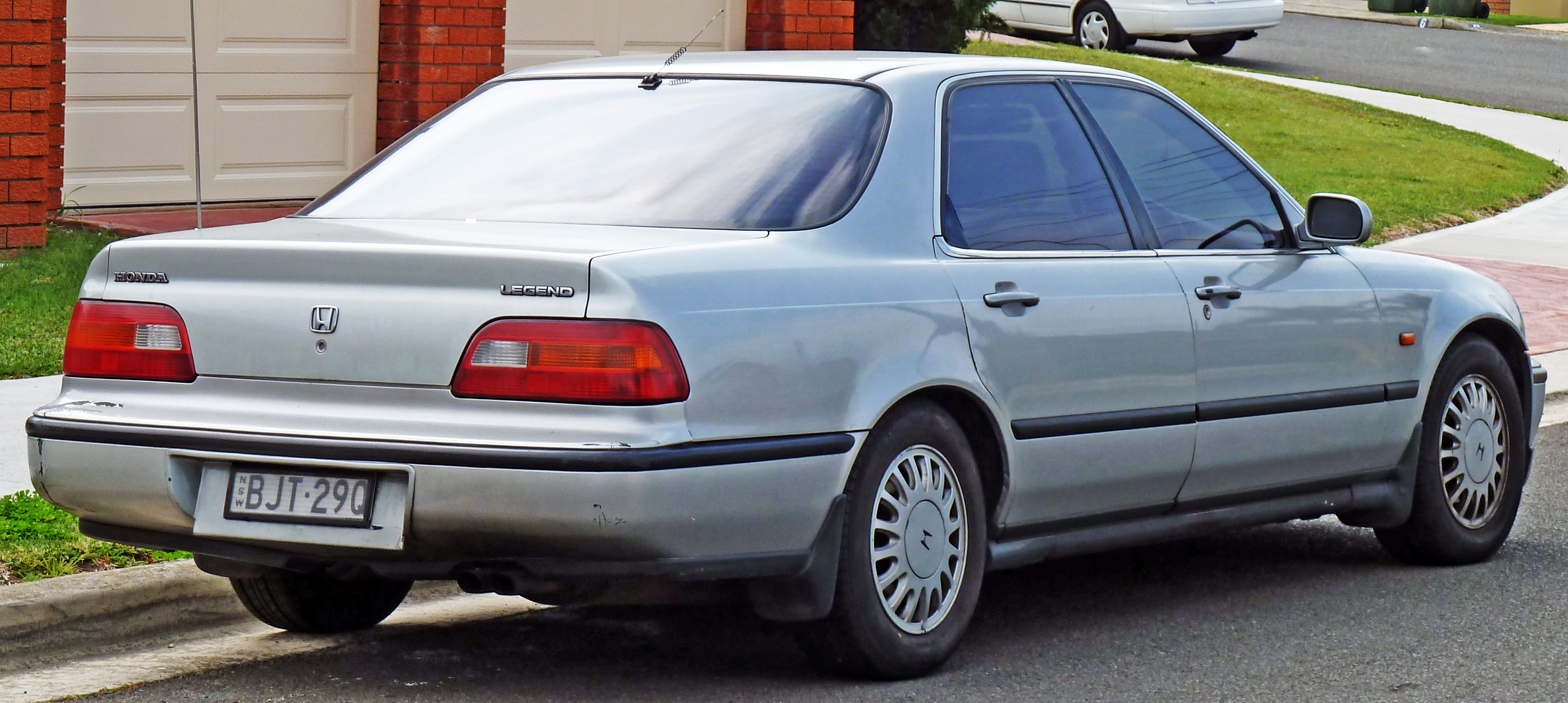
Honda Legend sedan (Australia)

=== Daewoo Arcadia ===
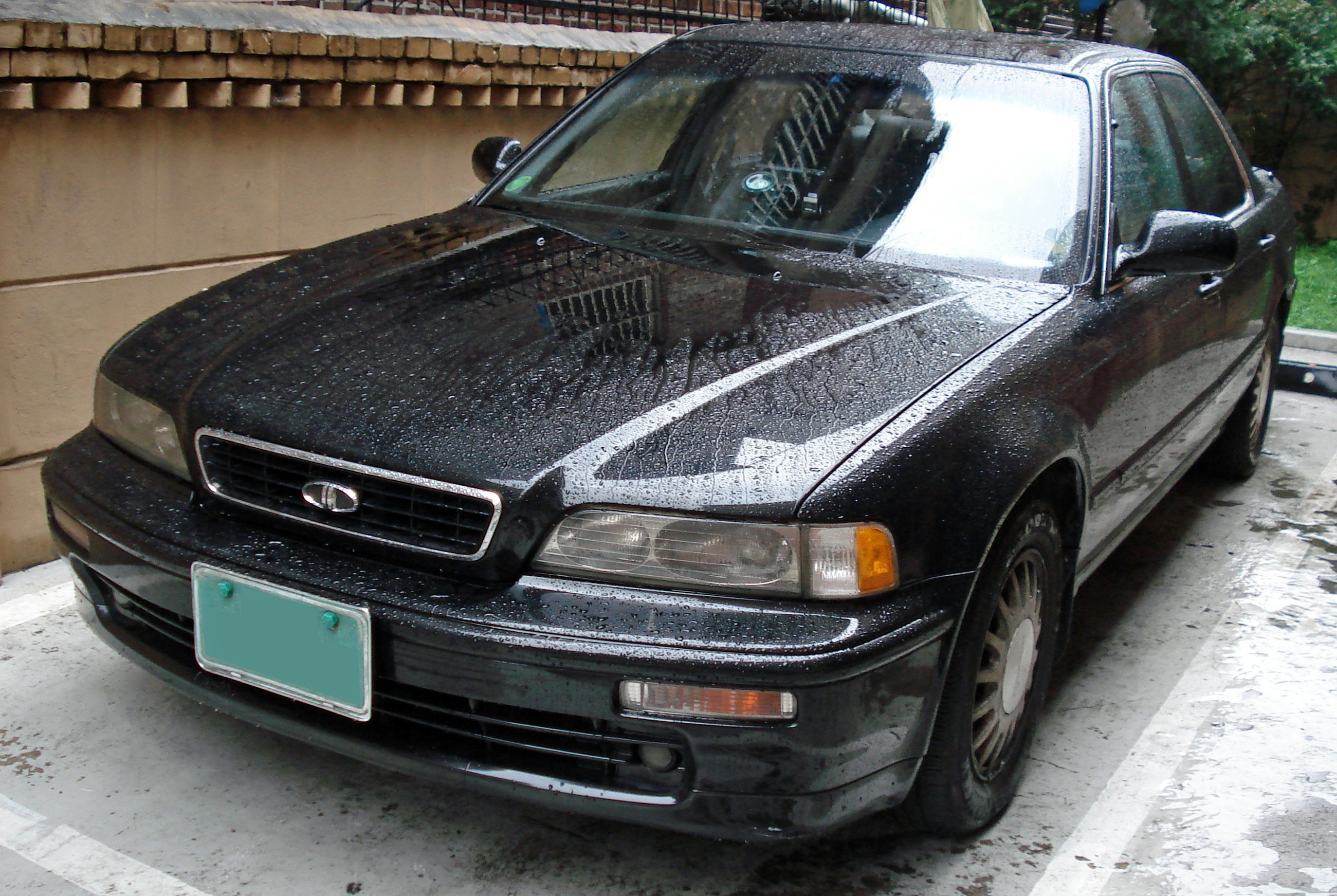
Daewoo Arcadia (South Korea)

The second-generation Legend was also manufactured by Daewoo in South Korea from 1994 to 1999 under the name of Daewoo Arcadia (ko:대우 아카디아), for the Korean market, replacing the Daewoo Imperial.

It was named for the region in Greece called Arcadia, a region regarded in Greek mythology as a utopian garden.

During this period, Honda had a loose alliance with Daewoo, and the Arcadia was larger than Hyundai Grandeur and Kia Potentia competitors. Daewoo Motors (GM Korea's predecessor) sold more than 800 vehicles. The Arcadia was essentially the base level Legend. At the time of the Arcadia's introduction, it had a large engine for a car in Korea, with a 220-horsepower V6 3.2 C32A, and the starting price was a high 41.9 million won. ABS, dual airbags, safety belt pre-tensioners, and advanced car safety features for the time, commensurate with a focus on protecting the passengers. Some of the features included driver's seat position memory function and front heated seats, push-button door opening and closing devices, automatic climate control air conditioning. After the acquisition of SsangYong by Daewoo, the Arcadia was succeeded by the somewhat larger Chairman (a rebadged SsangYong). Remaining stock of Arcadia sedans were reduced in price, and the Arcadia ended production in December of that year.

== Third generation (KA9; 1995) ==
Third generation (KA9)
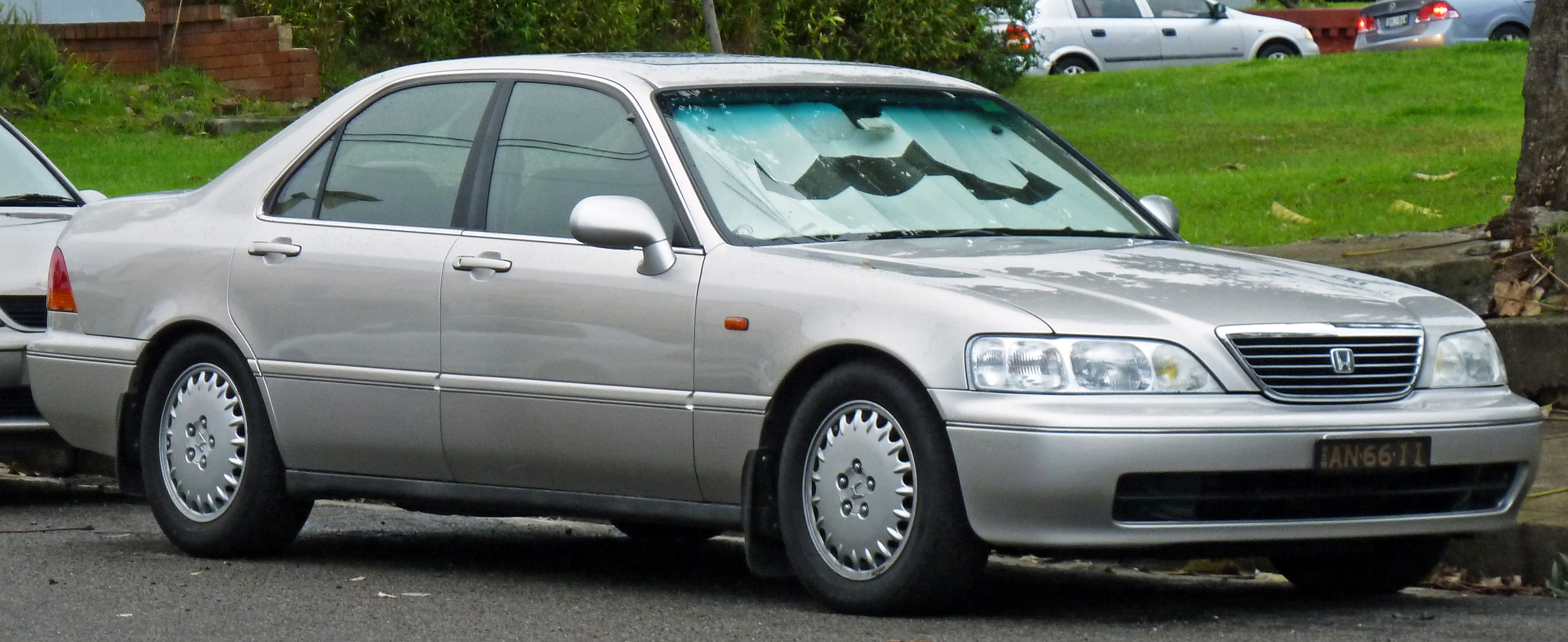

Overview
- Also called: Acura 3.5RL
- Production: 1995–2004
- Assembly: Japan: Sayama, Saitama (Sayama Plant)

Body and chassis
- Body style: 4-door sedan
- Layout: Longitudinal front-engine, front-wheel-drive

Powertrain
- Engine: 3.5 L C35A V6
- Transmission: 4-speed automatic

Dimensions
- Wheelbase: 2,911 mm (114.6 in)
- Length: 1996–1998: 4,956 mm (195.1 in); 1999–2001: 4,994 mm (196.6 in); 2002–2004: 4,996 mm (196.7 in)
- Width: 1996–1998: 1,811 mm (71.3 in); 1999–2001: 1,814 mm (71.4 in); 2002–2004: 1,821 mm (71.7 in)
- Height: 1996–1998: 1,384 mm (54.5 in); 1999–2001: 1,435 mm (56.5 in); 2002–2004: 1,384 mm (54.5 in)

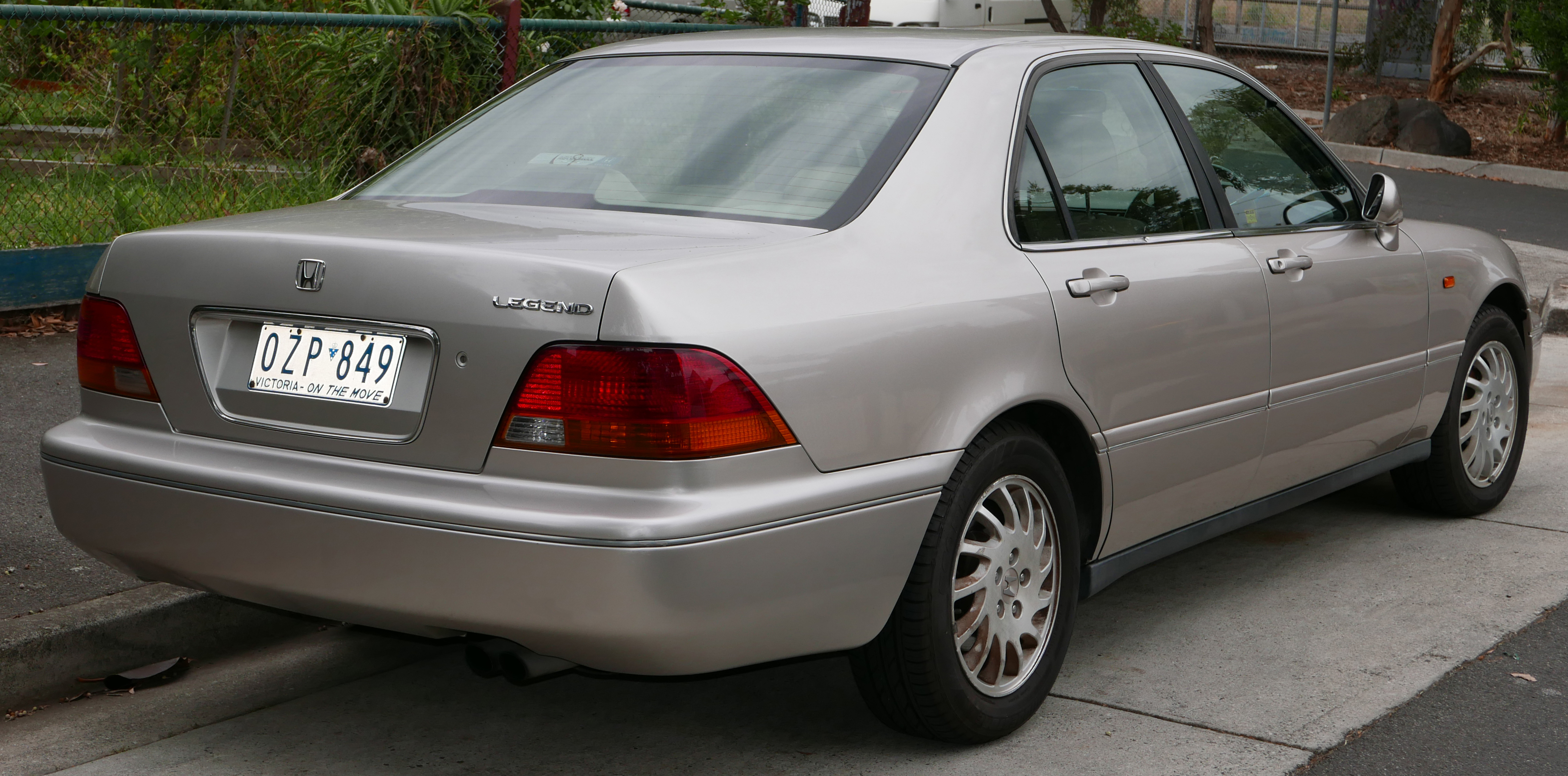
1998 Honda Legend sedan (Australia; pre-facelift)

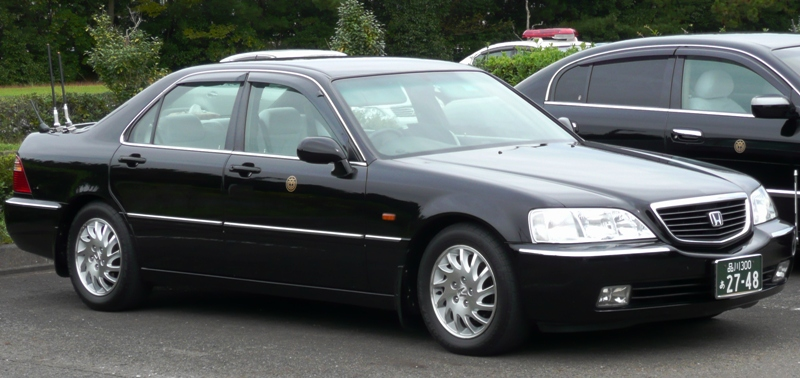
Honda Legend sedan (Japan; facelift)

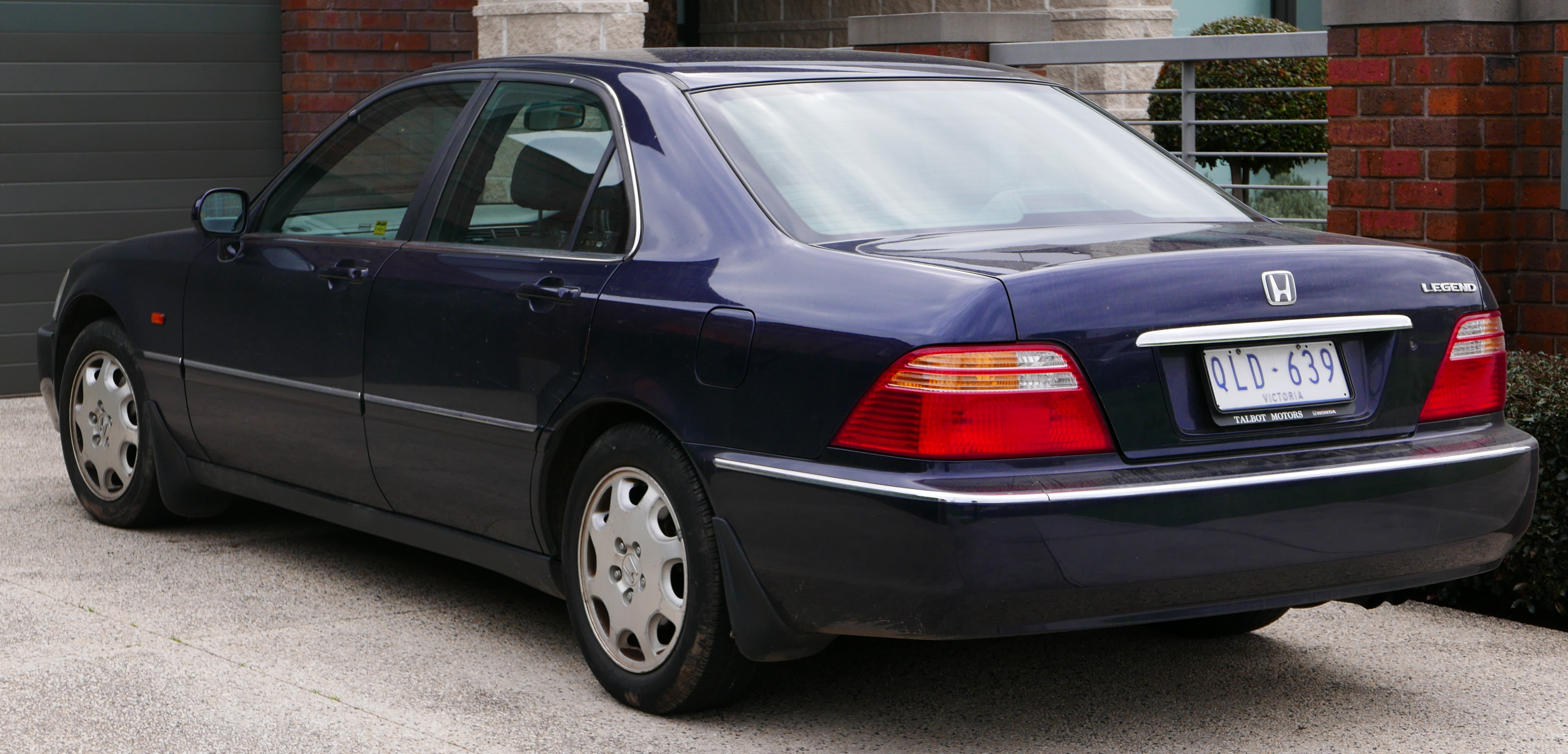
2000 Honda Legend sedan (Australia; facelift)

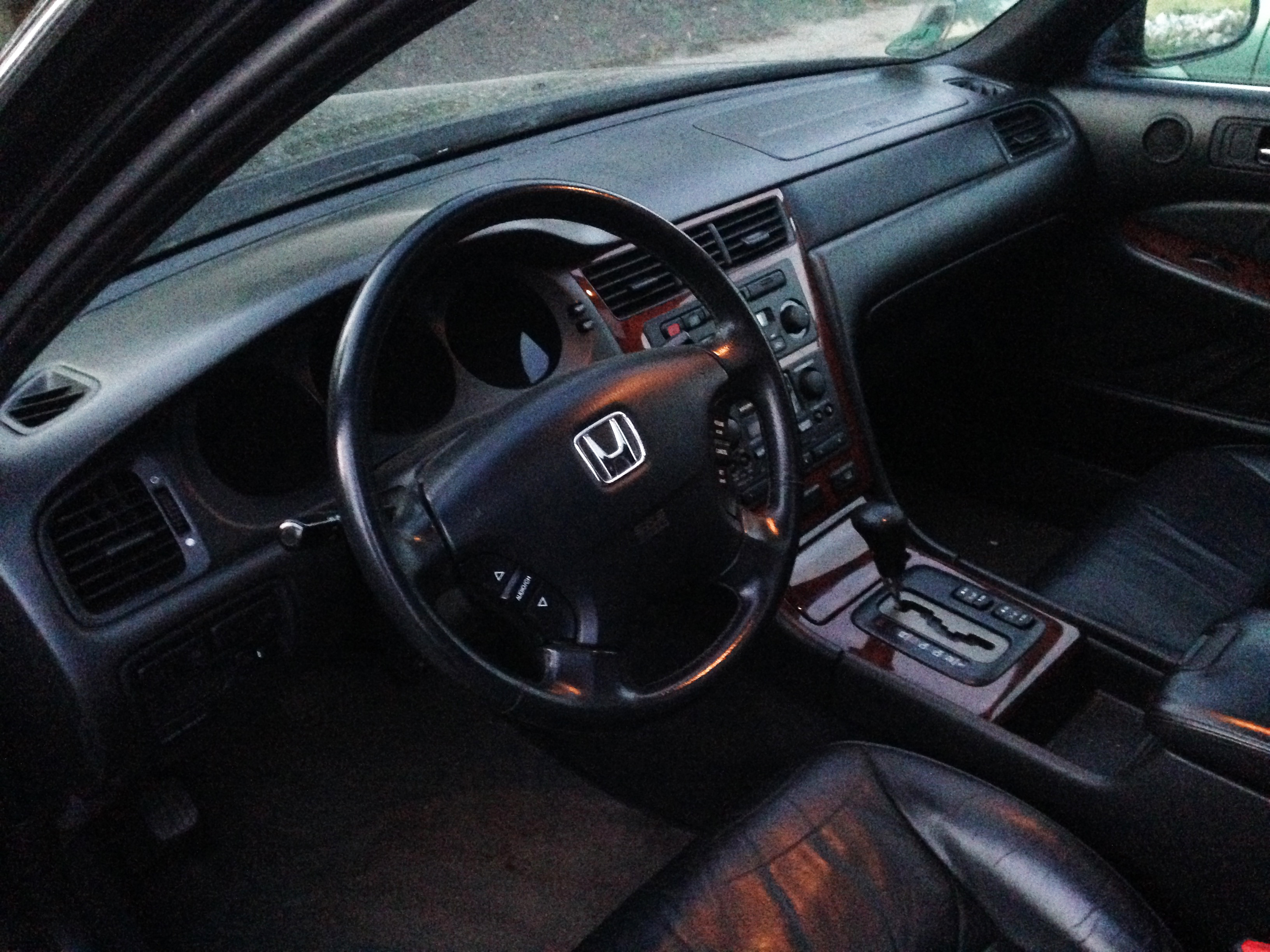
Interior

The third generation Legend appeared on October 26, 1995, continuing the Honda tradition of front-wheel drive, and increasing the engine displacement to 3.5 L with the horsepower remaining at 215 PS (158.1 kW; 212.1 bhp). The actual Honda internal platform code for this vehicle is E-KA9.

In an attempt by Honda to dispute the call for the Legend to be offered with a V8 to be considered an international premium level luxury car, this generation had a wheelbase that compared to the Infiniti Q45 at 2,830 mm (111.4 in) with a length at 5,056 mm (199.1 in), and the Lexus LS at 2,850 mm (112.2 in) wheelbase and 4,996 mm (196.7 in) length. The Legend also had very similar dimensions to the front-wheel drive, V8 sedan Mitsubishi Proudia which was sold only in Japan. In Japan, the Legend continued to compete with the Toyota Crown, the Mitsubishi Debonair, the Mazda Luce, and the Nissan Cedric and Gloria at the executive sedan segment.

The trim level "Exclusive" returned as the upper level car, with the standard grade vehicle known as "Euro", with the more performance tuned suspension. The wood trim used was more upscale for the "Exclusive" vehicle with a lower grade wood used on the "Euro". Both vehicles were very well equipped. The instruments used were simplified from previous versions, but 100% wool moquette upholstery was still offered, along with optional leather. Honda's internet-based navigation system Internavi was introduced with this generation on Japanese domestic vehicles. The Luxman premium sound system was still available. The styling was said to more closely resemble the Mercedes-Benz E-Class and a transponder key security system was offered. Starting with this generation, cabin air filters (also known as pollen filters) were installed as standard equipment and are located behind the glove compartment internationally.

September 21, 1998 saw a minor styling change, with the front grille cutting into the front bumper, providing a more prominent front grille. Emphasis was increased on providing a luxurious sense of style, both inside and out. Side impact airbags now complemented the dual front airbags as standard equipment. The steering wheel can be automatically adjusted based on the position of the driver's seat, thereby optimizing a safe distance between the driver and the airbag installed in the steering wheel.

September 24, 1999 saw the engine meet emission regulations to comply with California LEV requirements.

June 19, 2003 saw the interior updated, and maple wood was offered for interior decoration. Electro-luminescent instruments were offered, as well as a higher grade of leather interior.

The third-generation model was offered as a sedan only. A mid-term facelift came in 1999.

In the U.S. market, when the Legend coupe was discontinued, they were offered the Acura CL two-door coupé that was based on the American market Honda Accord coupé, so as to continue offering a premium vehicle in this niche.

== Fourth generation (KB1/2; 2004) ==
Fourth generation (KB1/KB2)
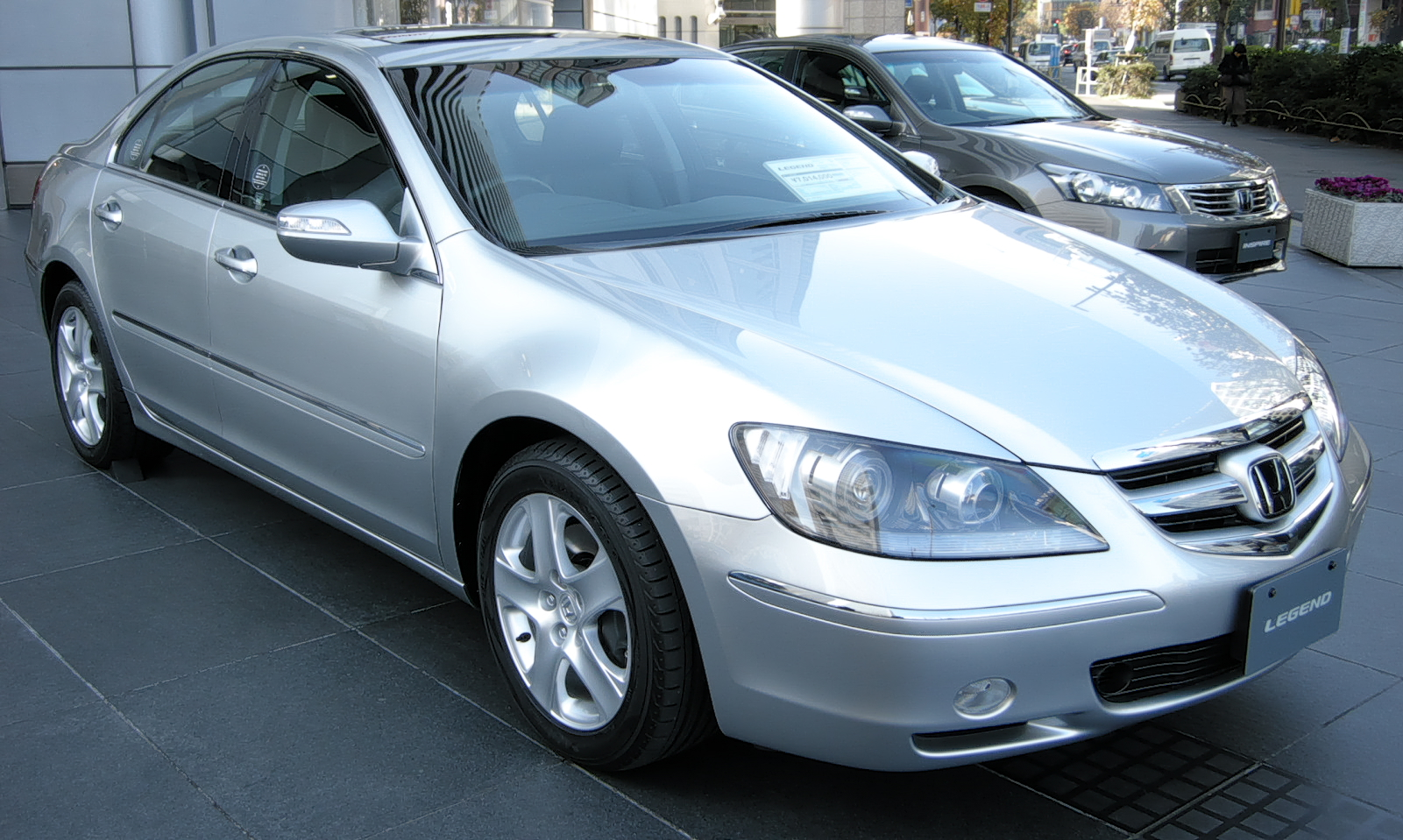
- 2005–08 Honda Legend (KB1) (Japan)

Overview
- Also called: Acura RL
- Production: 2004–2012
- Model years: 2005–2012
- Assembly: Japan: Sayama, Saitama (Sayama Plant)
- Designer: Toshinobu Minami (2002)

Body and chassis
- Body style: 4-door sedan
- Layout: Front-engine, four-wheel-drive
- Related: Honda Accord (USA-spec); Honda Odyssey (North America); Honda Inspire; Honda Elysion

Powertrain
- Engine: 3.5 L J35A V6 (2004–2008); 3.7 L J37A4 V6 (2008–2012)
- Transmission: 5-speed automatic (2004–2010); 6-speed automatic (2011–2012)

Dimensions
- Wheelbase: 2,799 mm (110.2 in)
- Length: 2004–'08: 4,917 mm (193.6 in); 2008–'12: 4,973 mm (195.8 in)
- Width: 1,847 mm (72.7 in)
- Height: 2004–'08: 1,450 mm (57.1 in); 2008–'12: 1,453 mm (57.2 in)

The swoopier, shorter fourth-generation Honda Legend was launched on October 7, 2004, and became Japan's Car of the Year for 2004–2005, marking the fourth time in five years that Honda has taken the award. Its reduced dimensions over the third generation model seem to suggest a return to what made the Legend so popular with the first generation, being a top level sedan that offered something different from its competitors. The 2011 model marks the 25th anniversary of Honda Legend production.

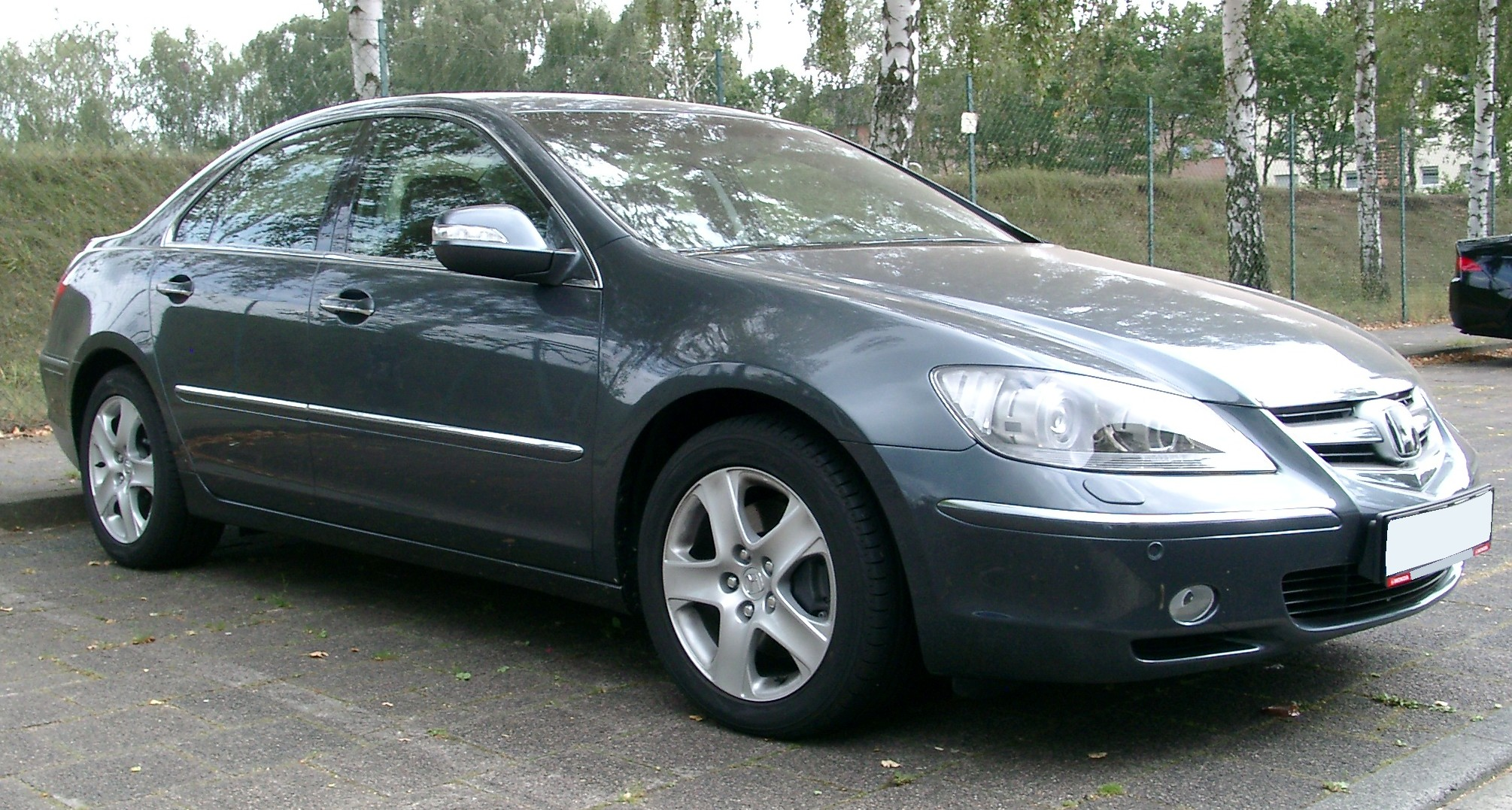
2005–2008 Honda Legend (KB1) (Europe)

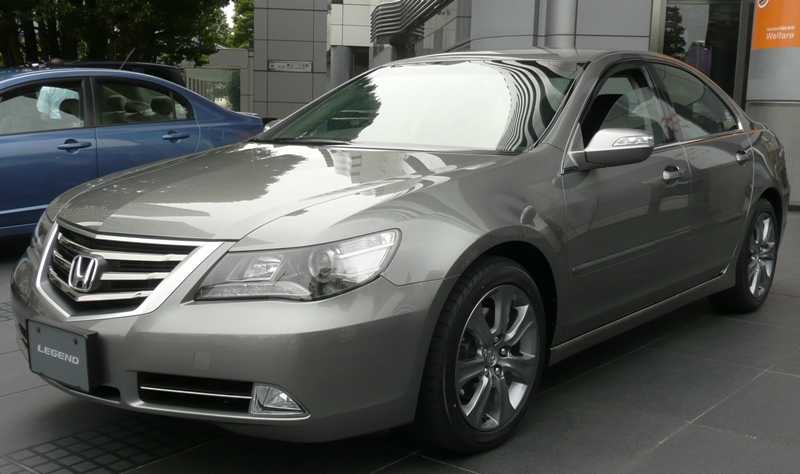

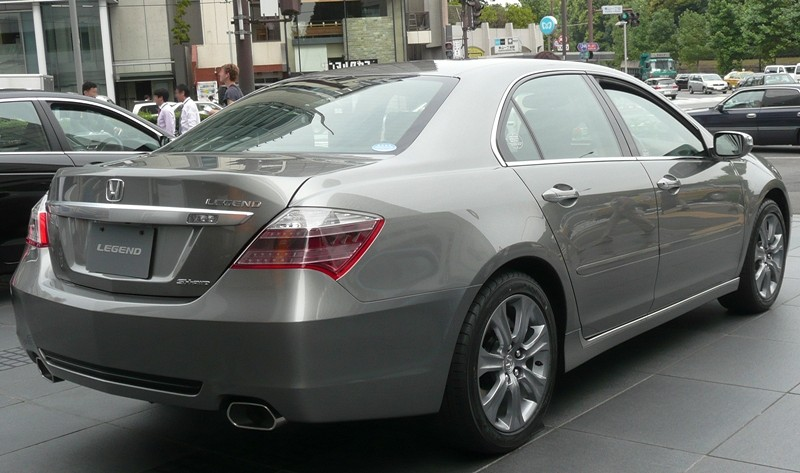
2009–2012 Honda Legend (KB2) (Japan)

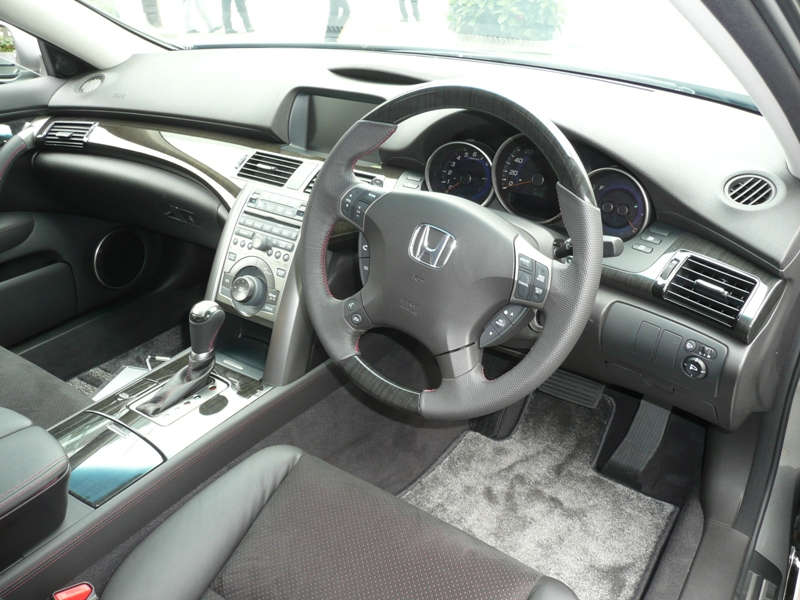
Honda Legend KB2 interior

In an attempt to address market driven requests that the Legend needed to be a rear-wheel drive sedan with a V8 engine, Honda introduced four-wheel drive technology on the Legend, called "Super Handling All-Wheel Drive" (SH-AWD), which earned Honda the Japan Car of the Year, and Mosuto 2005 Annual RJC technology of the Year award. This generation Legend is only available with the Super Handling All-Wheel Drive powertrain. Due to continuous product improvement efforts over past generations, the series CP3 North American Honda Accord (Honda Inspire in some markets) shares wheelbase, length, width and engine displacement almost exactly with this generation Legend, with a reduced price in many international markets. The Legend does have a higher level of standard features and optional equipment but not by much.

Select-Shift was introduced on the 5-speed automatic transmission. The newly designed J35A 3.5-liter V6 was changed from a 90 degree "V", in use since the first 1986 C25A V6 engine, to a 60 degree layout, while VTEC was added to improve efficiency (M-TEC was added by the MUGEN division, called the "M1 package"). In a move echoing the many "firsts" introduced by the first generation Legend, the horsepower no longer complied with the self-imposed horsepower restrictions of the Japanese auto industry. The engine is capable of 300 PS (221 kW; 296 bhp).

Perhaps to accommodate the all-wheel drive setup, the engine was reoriented from a longitudinal installation used since 1990, to a transverse installation, which was the original orientation of the first generation model. Honda began to expand the Acura division into Mexico, Hong Kong and China. Plans to introduce the Acura brand in Japan haven't been formally announced, relying on speculation. This generation Legend shares large sedan duties with the Honda Inspire, known in North America as the Honda Accord starting with model year 2003 (series UC1) and continuing with the series CP3 sedan. September 15, 2005 saw a mild body restyle, which included a rear backup camera. The Akita and Kumamoto Prefectures adopted this Legend as the official car for local senior government officials.

In the UK, the Legend is only offered in one trim, the EX. Buyers can also choose to pay extra for the ADAS (Advanced Driver Assist System) package. The ADAS package includes Honda's CMBS (Collision Mitigation Braking System), and LKAS (Lane Keeping Assist System).

The Legend received a Mid-Model Change (MMC) for the 2009 model year. Among the usual upgrades, the Honda Legend offered some additional optional safety features, including Lane Keeping Assistance System (LKAS). The LKAS could actually make small steering adjustments to keep a car in lane so long as the radius of the turn was more than 220 meters, which was the legal minimum in Japan. The LKAS would relinquish control at the slightest steering input so the driver had control at all times. Intelligent Night Vision with the world's first pedestrian detection feature, and a standard pop-up hood for pedestrian safety. The night vision system uses a separate heads up type display projected on the center bottom of the windshield. The infrared cameras do not require a light source, and the software is able to detect human like figures, surround the image with a red box and give audible caution tones. The pop-up hood uses a series of sensors that can detect a pedestrian-like object being thrown onto the hood. An actuator will pop the hood up at the rear, close to the base of the windshield, 10 cm (4 inches) to help minimize pedestrian injuries, especially head trauma. All markets feature energy absorbing hood and fender supports and deformable windshield wiper pivots to minimize pedestrian injury. Honda's internet-based navigation system Internavi is standard equipment on Japanese domestic vehicles.

In October 2010, it is reported that Brake Defect from Honda Legend were delivered to customers before the problem is discovered. Honda says that it doesn't know how many of its vehicles have suffered a faulty brake system. The U.S. Honda outfit says it will replace the faulty seal and, if leaking has occurred, the brake booster will be replaced as well. At least some owners in the UAE, Saudi Arabia and other GCC countries are likely affected. Honda told that no stop-sale is issued.

In June 2012, Honda Japan announced the Legend and Inspire were to stop being produced at the Sayama, Saitama, Japan plant.

=== Reception ===
The second-generation 2005 Acura RL appeared on Car and Driver's Ten Best list for 2005. The car also garnered a CNET.com "Editor's Choice" Award for Top Tech Car.

The SH-AWD all-wheel drive system was lauded by Popular Science as one of the best automotive innovations of 2004, and earned the 2005 "Tech Car of the Year" from CNET.com. Subsequent moves by both Audi and BMW to design and market their own versions of torque vectoring all-wheel drive systems bear out the innovative nature of the SH-AWD design.

While critically acclaimed, sales did not meet expectations. During the first six months of 2010, Acura sold only 872 RLs, compared to 5,650 Lexus LS and 6,602 Infiniti M sedans. Enthusiasts and dealers said that the RL was not competitive because it is smaller, uses front-wheel drive, and lacks a V8 option, compared to its larger rivals in the mid-luxury segment that are rear-wheel drive and have a V8 available.

Some have suggested that the initial price of the RL is perceived to be out of its bracket. As the new RL offered more features and performance than the base version of its luxury competitors (i.e., the base six-cylinder BMW 5 Series), Honda Japan suggested that it could charge more, though Honda Canada disagreed. The RL's initial MRSP was $69,500 CAD, more than the six-cylinder BMW 525i and close to that of the V8-powered BMW 545i. At the RL's price point, most consumers expected a V8; furthermore, they did not perceive Acura as being on par with its German rivals and expected more value from the Japanese marque. The damage from Honda Japan's alleged hubris was done, perhaps giving the RL an unfavorable impression that could not be removed, even though Honda Canada later reduced the RL's price. The UK magazine Car ran a Honda Legend on its long term fleet and rated the car for its performance, handling and acceleration but felt the styling was too anonymous. In 2009, the new generation of the Acura TL was released and it is expected to offer tough competition to the RL, as the TL has essentially the same engine (but with 5 more horsepower), the SH-AWD system, similar dimensions, and many of the RL's features for only $44,900 CAD.

In October 2010, the Acura RL has been named as one of Consumer Reports most reliable cars, one of among 5 Honda models (Acura TL with front-wheel drive; Acura RL luxury car; Honda CR-V small SUV; Acura RDX small upscale SUV, and Honda Ridgeline compact pickup truck) named as most reliable in various categories.

=== Safety ===
ANCAP test results* Honda Legend (2006)
Test	Score
Overall	5 /5 stars
Frontal offset	13.20/16
Side impact	16/16
Pole	2/2
Seat belt reminders	3/3
Whiplash protection	Not Assessed
Pedestrian protection	Adequate
Electronic stability control	Standard

== Fifth generation (KC1/2; 2014) ==
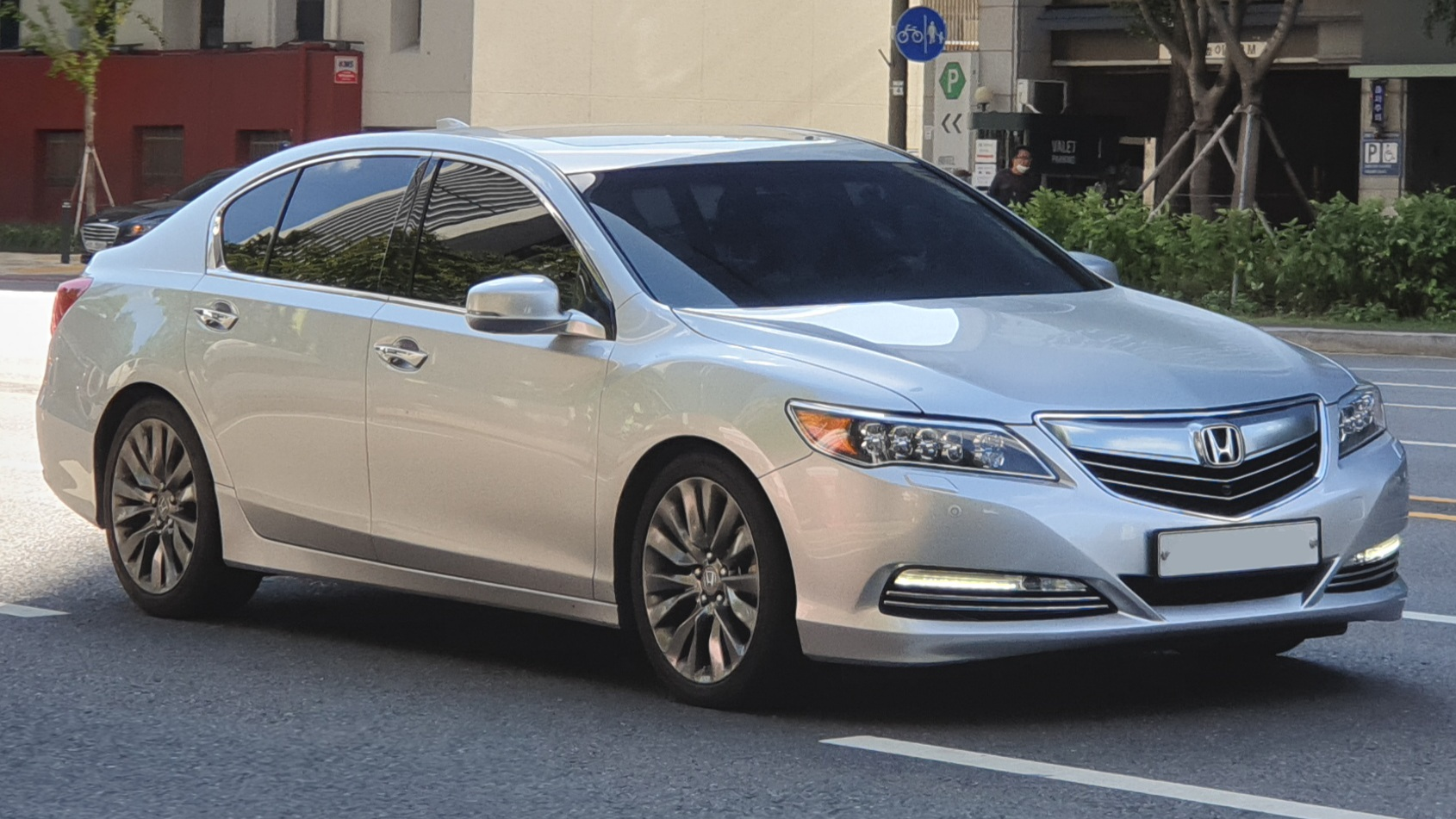
2015 Honda Legend

The fifth generation Legend was unveiled in Japan on November 10, 2014, and went on sale on February 20, 2015, it is near identical to the Acura RLX and only available in Sport Hybrid. The facelifted model was unveiled in Japan on October 2, 2017, and launched at the Tokyo Motor Show on October 27, 2017.

=== Facelift ===
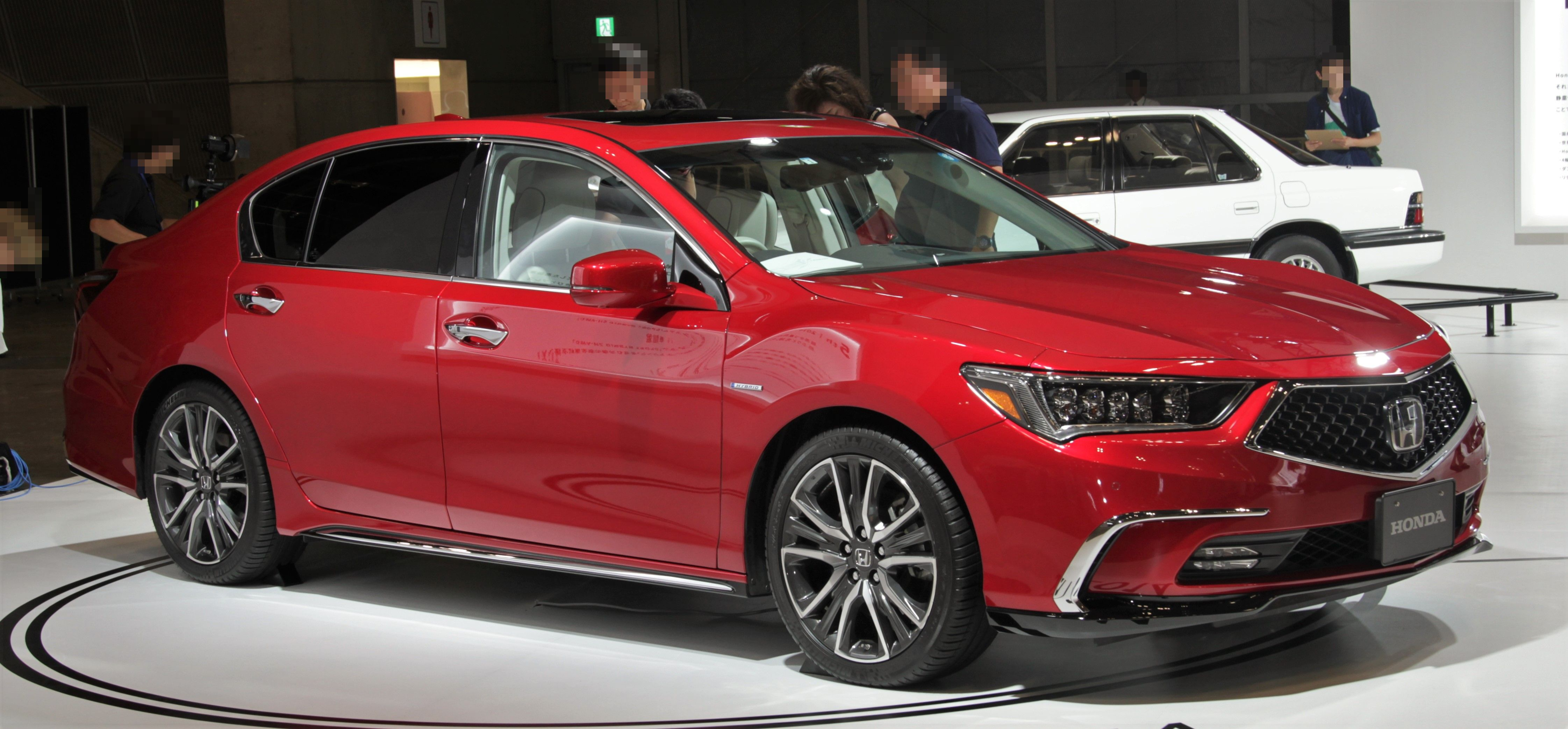

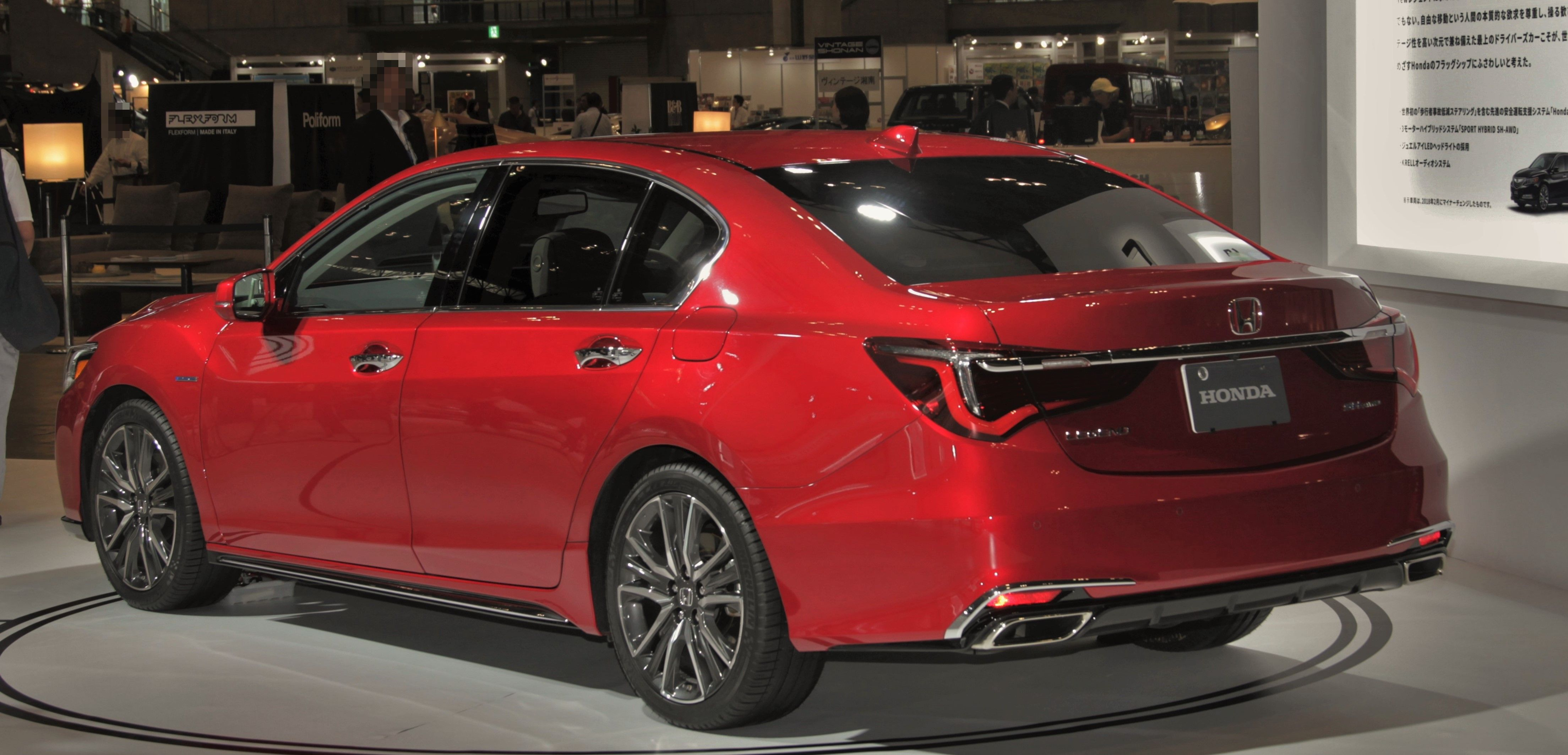
2018 Honda Legend

The front fascia of the facelifted model is based from the facelifted RLX. It is equipped with HONDA Sensing which now includes Traffic Jam Assist (Congestion Driving Support Function) which supports steering, acceleration, braking, and camera/sensor harmony when congested in traffic jams. The length grew to 5,032 mm, making it the longest Honda/Acura sedan to date, with length exceeding 5,000 mm.

=== Discontinued sales of RLX ===
2020 was the final model year for the North American Acura RLX due to low sales, with no direct successor planned.

=== Hybrid EX ===
On March 5, 2021, Honda began lease sales in Japan of the all-new Legend equipped with "Honda SENSING Elite", which is a variation of Honda SENSING, a suite of advanced safety and driver-assistive technologies currently available for Honda vehicles around the world. One of the “elite” technologies is the “Traffic Jam Pilot” function, an advanced technology qualifying for Level 3 automated driving (conditional automated driving in limited area).

=== Discontinuation ===
In June 2021, it was announced that the Sayama plant that produces the Legend would be closed at the end of 2021 and the current car would not have a successor. With the discontinuation, Honda Accord is once again the largest Honda sedan.

== See also ==
- Acura Legend
- Acura RL
- Acura RLX
