= Connolly Leather =

British leather company

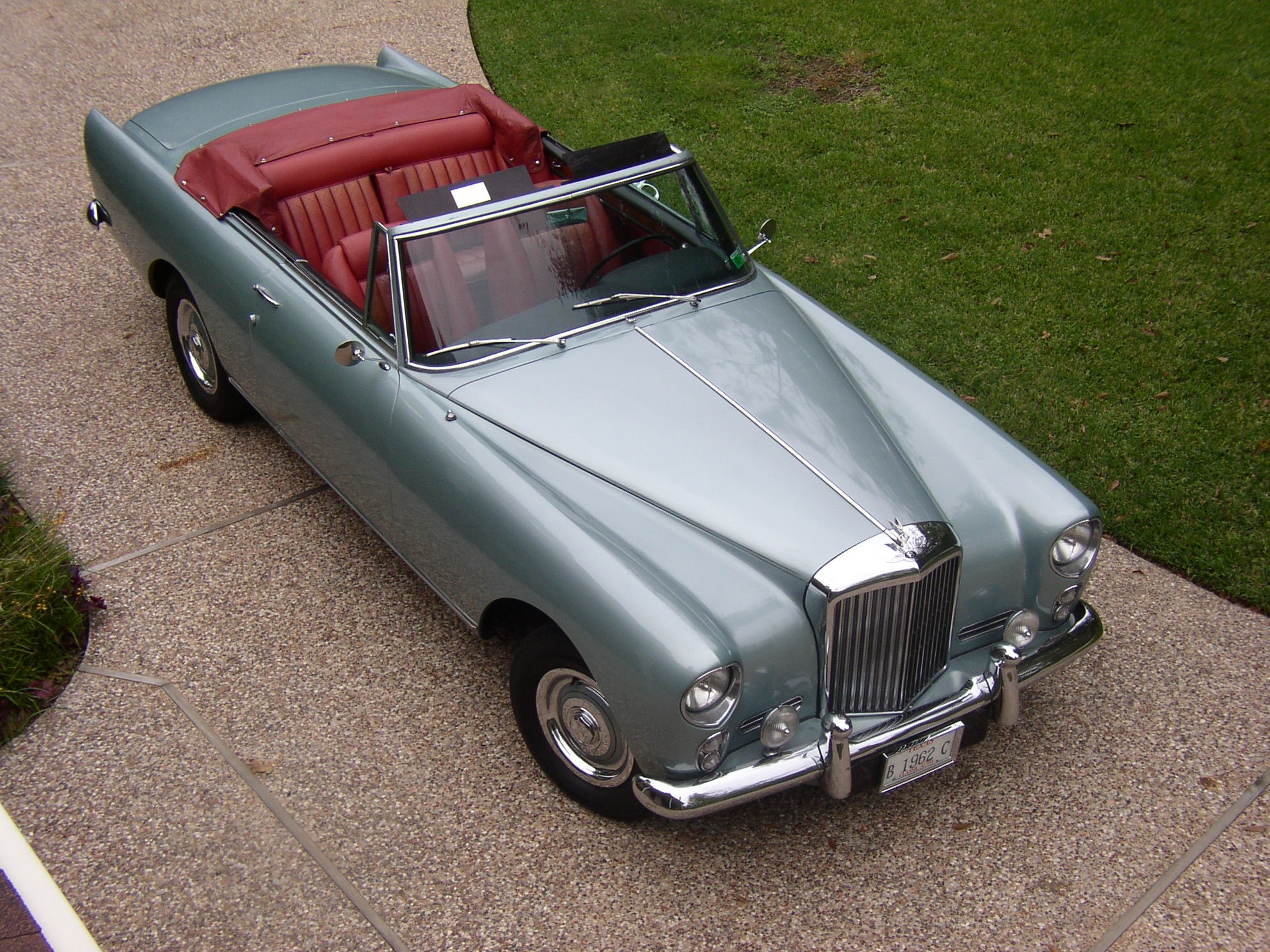
Connolly leather in a 1962 Bentley S2 Continental

Connolly Leather Limited was a British supplier of highly finished leather primarily to car manufacturers. Founded in 1878, it went out of business in that form in 2002. A successor firm, Connolly Brothers, UK, has resumed producing traditional Connolly leather products and lines, including its popular Vaumol.

== History ==
Connolly supplied most of the leather for the British car industry, including Aston Martin & Lagonda, Rolls-Royce & Bentley, Jaguar & Daimler, Vauxhall Motors and Rover cars including its Land Rover and its Range Rover line of vehicles, as well as some MG and Mini models during the Rover Group era. Non-British makes included Ferrari, Maserati, Lincoln, Nissan and Honda. Its leather was also used for the seats in the Supermarine Spitfires used in World War 2.

Connolly leather gained such prominence in the world of luxury travel beyond cars, such as private jets and yachts, that it was selected for high profile projects as Concorde and the Queen Elizabeth 2 ocean liner.

Connolly also reached the world of interiors and design, with Mies Van Der Rohe's original Barcelona chairs upholstered with Connolly leather as well as the benches in Britain's Houses of Parliament, together with many other parliaments around the world. Connolly earned a Royal Warrant, being appointed Leather Tanners and Curriers to Queen Elizabeth II.

In addition to upholstery, Connolly Leather has been used in the manufacture of high-end sound audio components such as the B&W Signature 800 series loudspeakers. Connolly Leather was also used by Luxman and "retro-design" transistor radios from British manufacturer Roberts.

The family started a retail business, Connolly Luxury Leathergoods Limited, selling exclusive and bespoke leather goods and accessories. The business developed a high profile clientele which included celebrities, socialites and industry leaders. Today, Connolly accessory designs can be found in museums around the world.

The company also sold leather-care products (e.g., Connolly Hide-Food); restoring leather is sometimes known as "Connollising", thanks to the reputation of the company.

=== Demise ===
An attempt to expand into the American market in the 1990s failed badly and Connolly Leather ceased trading in June 2002.

=== Rebirth ===
In 2003, Jonathan Connolly established C B Leather Ltd and resumed the manufacture and production of high quality leather and now sells under both C B Leather and Connolly Brothers, UK.

The recipes to Connolly Hide-Food and their Leather-Cleaner have since been sold or licensed and have returned to the market.
