= Gilbert Briggs =

Gilbert Arthur Briggs (29 December 1890 – 9 January 1978), commonly referred to as "G. A. Briggs", founded Wharfedale Wireless Works in Yorkshire, England, in 1932, and was a leading figure in the early development of high fidelity loudspeakers introducing such basics as the two-way loudspeaker and the ceramic magnet, as well as writing some famous books on audio and loudspeakers. Britain was at the forefront of developments in radio, audio and television, and Wharfedale is still known as a manufacturer of loudspeakers, although the company was sold in 1958 to The Rank Group and in the early 1990s to Verity Group PLC.

In the 1950s, Briggs embarked on an ambitious collaboration with a close friend and colleague, Peter Walker, founder of Quad Electroacoustics. With Quad supplying the amplifiers and Wharfedale building the loudspeaker systems, they embarked on what was to become an industry-defining series of concerts when audiences were invited to experience live versus recorded music first hand. They toured the UK and the US, playing at venues including the Royal Festival Hall in London and Carnegie Hall in New York City.

== Biography ==
Gilbert was the son of Phineas Briggs, a mill worker who was descended from a line of Yorkshire weavers and textile mill workers. Phineas died of pleuro-pneumonia, aged 36, leaving Gilbert, aged nine, and three young siblings, to be brought up by their mother, Mary Anne Emsley, who abandoned their back-to-back house to move the family in with her mother. Despite these desperate circumstances, Gilbert later wrote that they were happy, and he was very soon to move to Kings Lynn to attend technical school. Later, he attended Crossley and Porter Orphan School in Halifax, where he acquired a love of classical music. He was then to spend 27 years in the textile industry, often travelling as a merchant. In 1914, he was rejected for army service following a medical screening in which he was considered to have a heart condition, though this was never to affect him in any way. This diagnosis saved him from fighting in the First World War and he continued in textiles at Holdworth Lund and Co.

In 1924, Briggs married Doris Edna Mart (Edna) who was eleven years younger than he. As the textile industry went into decline during the Great Depression, his interest increasingly turned to loudspeakers and audio reproduction and, following his decision around 1932 to establish a loudspeaker manufacturing firm, Edna became his helper in cone assembly and coil winding.

== Wharfedale Speakers ==
Briggs built his first loudspeaker in the cellar of his home in Ilkley in the valley of the River Wharfe known as Wharfedale.

== Live concert hall demonstrations ==
Briggs staged a number of live events in major concert halls, hotels and other public buildings where he demonstrated recordings played over Wharfedale loudspeakers alongside live music, sometimes recording and playing back on the spot and taking advantage of developments in magnetic tape recording. His decision to book the Royal Festival Hall, recently built for the Festival of Britain, in 1954 was considered brave, but the event was sold out in four days. Despite the fact that only low power amplifiers were available (60 watts or so where today's engineers would provide 5,000 watts or more) the event was a success.

== Publications ==
In 1948, Briggs wrote his first book, Loudspeakers: The Why and How of Good Reproduction, which sold out in five months and was reprinted many times. He later wrote an enlarged version called Sound Reproduction.

In 1960, he published A to Z in Audio, a pot-pourri of anecdotes and reflections on different aspects of audio engineering, related with quiet humour, under headings arranged alphabetically.

In 2012, David Briggs (died 9 January 2018), whose grandfather was Gilbert Briggs' first cousin, wrote a book called A Pair of Wharfedales — The story of Gilbert Briggs and his Loudspeakers.

== See also ==
- Celestion
- Goodmans Industries
- KEF
- Spendor
