= International Audio Group =

Manufacturer of hi-fi equipment

The International Audio Group (IAG) is a Chinese manufacturer of consumer and professional audio & hi-fi components. It is based in Shenzhen in China. It is owned and run by twin brothers Bernard and Michael Chang.

== Products ==
IAG has purchased several British hi-fi manufacturers, including Audiolab, Wharfedale, Quad Electroacoustics, Mission, Tag McLaren, and Castle Acoustics; Japanese brand Luxman; and several Italian manufacturers of lighting equipment including f.a.l. and Coef. It has a manufacturing plant in Ji'an China employing 1500 people.
