= Quad Electroacoustics =

British hi-fi company

Quad Electroacoustics Limited
- Type: Private limited company
- Industry: Home entertainment equipment manufacturing & distribution
- Founded: 1936
- Headquarters: Huntingdon, England
- Products: Hi-fi equipment
- Parent: International Audio Group
- Website: www.quad-hifi.co.uk

QUAD Electroacoustics is a British manufacturer of hi-fi equipment, based Huntingdon, England. QUAD is part of the IAG Group, with corporate headquarters located in Shenzhen, China.

== Corporate history ==
The company was founded by Peter J. Walker in 1936 in London, and was initially called S.P. Fidelity Sound Systems. In 1936 the name was changed to the Acoustical Manufacturing Co. Ltd. The company moved from London to Huntingdon in 1941 after being bombed out of London in World War II.

The company initially produced only public address equipment but after the war they began to produce equipment designed for use in the home as a result of the rising demand for high quality domestic sound reproduction. Within a few years the company had transitioned almost entirely to manufacturing models for the home audio market.

Walker was quoted in December 1975 in Wireless World magazine, "An audio power amplifier is required to produce an output signal that differs from the input signal in magnitude only. It must therefore have occurred to every circuit designer that it should be a simple matter to take a portion of the output, compare it with the input to derive an error signal. It is then only necessary to amplify the error signal and add it to the output in the correct amplitude and phase to cancel completely the distortion of the primary amplifier."

Walker put this principle into practice using two amplifiers per channel instead of one. The first stage error amplifier is low powered but very high quality. The second amplifier is high powered, but of lesser audio high quality. Walker designed a way to compare the high powered output with the original audio input and derive the required error correction signal which is then injected into the audio path, in such a way that the high power audio output achieves a very low distortion figure, even at very high power levels. This innovative product earned Quad the Queen's Award for Technological Achievement in 1978.

Walker was also attributed with the famous hifi quote "the perfect amplifier is a straight wire with gain" with the implication being that nothing would be added, and nothing taken away from the signal, just a bigger version of the same thing at one end.

The name "QUAD" is an acronym for "Quality Unit Amplifier Domestic", used to describe the QUAD I amplifier. In 1983, when having become known for their QUAD range of products, the Acoustical Manufacturing Co. Ltd changed its name to QUAD Electroacoustics Ltd.

In 1995, QUAD Electroacoustics Ltd was bought by Verity Group plc, joining its existing brands of Wharfedale and Mission. A few changes were made, including shifting all production to Shenzhen, China.

In September 1997 the company changed ownership again as Verity Group sold off businesses to finance its development of flat panel loudspeakers. With Wharfedale it became part of the Chinese International Audio Group (IAG) under the management of Bernard and Michael Chang.

In 2003, a book was commissioned "QUAD:The Closest Approach" which offered a history of the company from its creation to that point.

Peter Walker died in 2003 at the age of 87. He had retired in the late 1980s, turning management over to his son Ross Walker.

== Public Address products ==
C25 integrated mono valve PA amplifier- 1941+
M31 integrated mono valve PA amplifier - 1946+
MB31 integrated mono valve PA amplifier - 1946+
M32 integrated mono valve PA amplifier - 1947+
MB32 integrated mono valve PA amplifier - 1947+
M60 integrated mono valve PA amplifier - 1947+
M18 integrated mono valve PA amplifier - 1952+
U112 combined integrated mono valve PA amplifier and mixer with 3 microphone inputs - 1945+
U113 combined integrated mono valve PA amplifier and radio tuner - 1945+
Source: Audio! Audio!

== Audio products ==
The company's first major products were released in 1948. The QA12 and QA12/P were low-powered mono valve designs. This unit's sound quality reproduction was high compared with other products on the market at the time, and was thus adopted for use by the BBC. This valve power amplifier featured a cathode-coupled winding dating from 1943, and eventually became the Quad I, accompanied by the Quad I Control Unit preamplifier, and Quad II.

=== Amplification ===
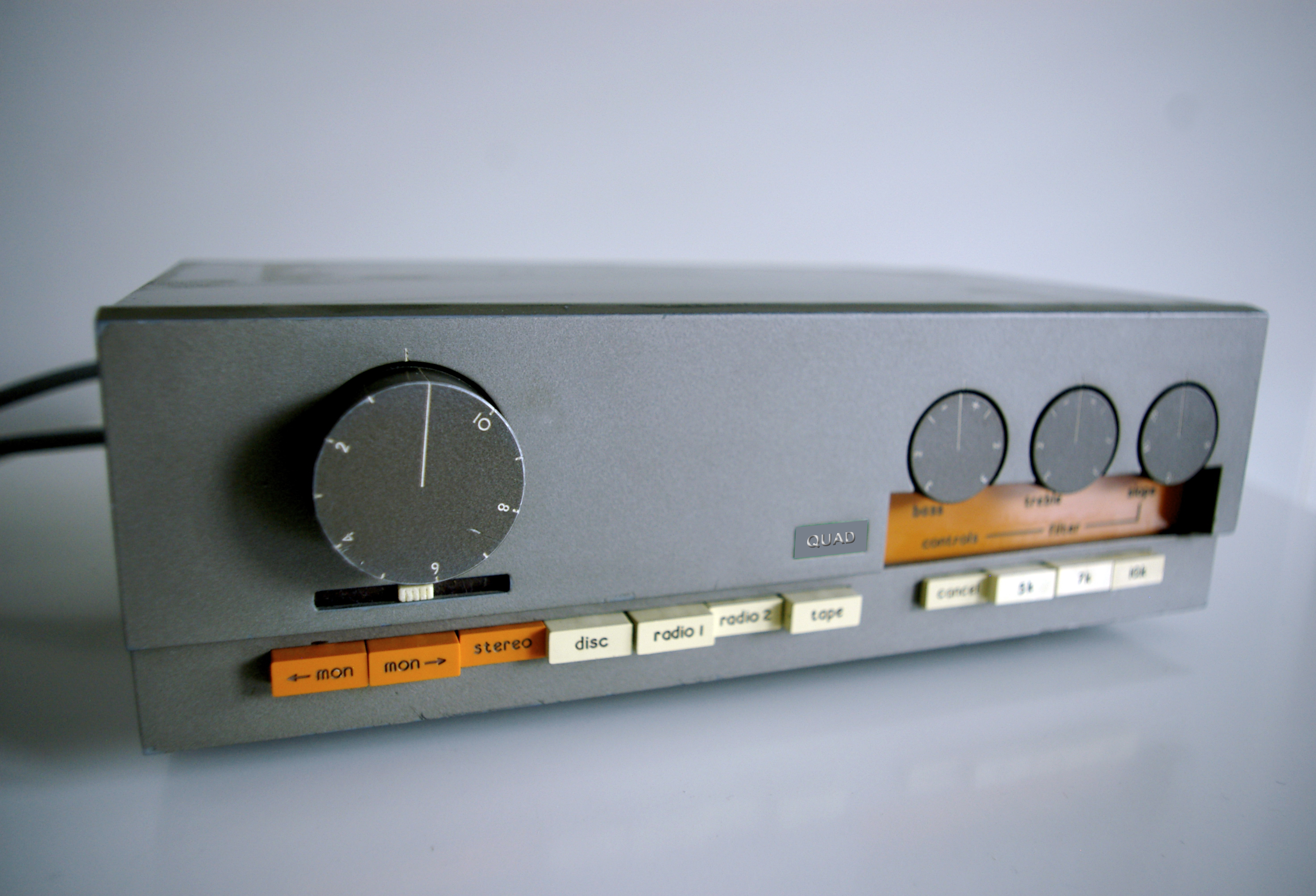
Quad 33 pre-amplifier

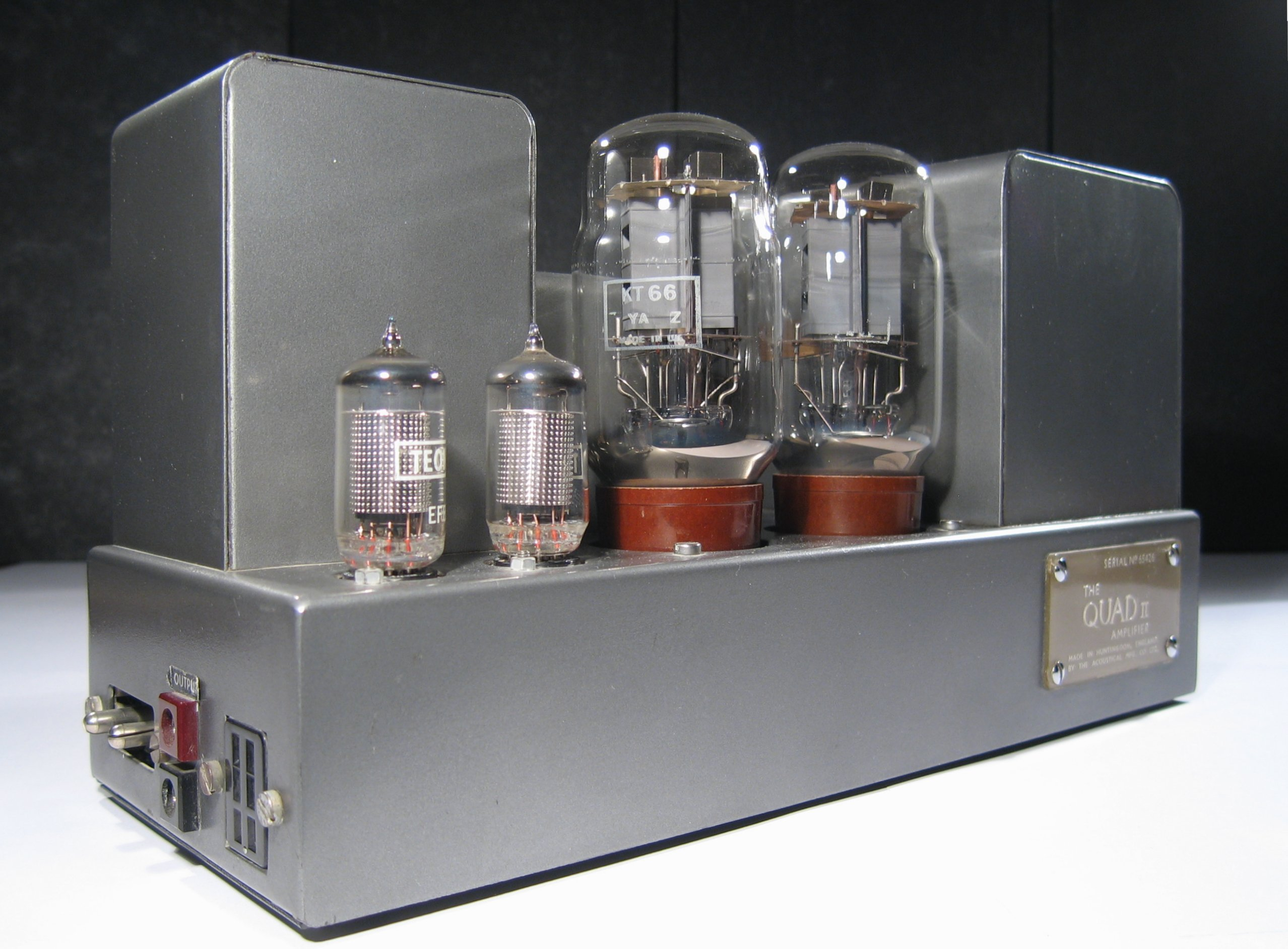
Quad II power amplifier

Following the mass production of 'stereo' vinyl records in 1958, the QC 22 control unit was developed and released in 1959. This was a stereo control unit that was designed to be used with a pair of QUAD II mono power amplifiers. To complement the QUAD II, the company also produced AM and FM tuners for use with the QC II & 22 control units.

The company made the transition to transistor-powered models in 1966 with the "professional" QUAD 50 monobloc which had a tapped transformer output, and in 1967 the consumer Quad 33 preamplifier and 303 stereo power amplifier combination.

Control Unit – Pre-amplifiers

Quad I Control Unit - 1951 to 1953 - 2000 units
Quad QCII Control Unit - 1953 to 1959 - 20,000 units
Quad 22 Control Unit - 1959 to 1967 - 30,000 units
Quad 33 – 1967 to 1982 – 120,000 units
Quad 34 – 1982 to 1995 – 41,000 units
Quad 44 – 1979 to 1989 – 40,000 units
Quad 66 – 1986 to 1997 – 12,000 units
Quad 99 - 1999 to at least 2003
Quad QC-twentyfour - 2000 to at least 2003

Stereo Power Amplifiers

Quad 303 – 1967 to 1985 – 94,000 units
Quad 77 - 1996 to 1999 - 2,500 units
Quad 99 - 1999 to at least 2003

Monobloc Power Amplifiers

Quad I - 1951 to 1953 - 2,000 units
Quad II - 1953 to 1970 - 90,000 units
Quad 50E - 1966 to 1983 - 12,000 units
Quad 99 - 2000 to at least 2003
Quad QMP

Current Dumping Power Amplifiers

Quad 405 – 1975 to 1982 – 64,000 units
Quad 405–2 1982 to 1993 – 100,000 units
Quad 306 – 1986 to 1995 – 25,000 units
Quad 606 – 1986 to 1997 – 27,700 units
Quad 707 - 1997 to 1999 - 4,500 units
Quad 909 - 1999 to at least 2003
Quad 909 Mono - 1999 to at least 2003
Quad QMP and QSP
Quad Artera

Integrated Amplifiers

Quad QA12/P - 1949 to 1951 - 1,000 units
Quad 77 - 1994 to 1999
Quad 99 Stereo - 1999 to at least 2003
Quad 99 Mono - 2000 to at least 2003

=== Tuners ===
AM tuners

Quad HR1 - 1949 to 1951 - 500 units
Quad /R - 1951 to 1955 - 1,000 units
Quad AM - 1954 to 1960 - 2,500 units
Quad AM2 - 1960 to 1969 - 10,000 units
Quad AM3 - 1969 to 1973 - 2,000 units

FM tuners

Quad FM - 1955 to 1967 - 25,000 units
Quad FM2 - 1968 to 1971 - 7,500 units-
Quad FM3 - 1971 to 1982 - 50,000 units
Quad FM4 - 1982 to 1995 - 37,000 units
Quad 66FM - 1991 to 1996 - 5,100 units
Quad 77FM - 1996 to 1999 - 1,500 unts
Quad 99FM - 1991 to at least 2003

FM stereo multiplex decoders

Quad FM Multiplex decoder - 1965 to 1967 - 5,000 units

=== CD players ===
Quad CD66 - 1989 to 1994 - 13,000 units
Quad CD67 - 1993 to 1996 - 6,100 units
Quad 77CD - 1996 to 1999 - 3,500 units
Quad 99CD - 1999 to at least 2003

=== Loudspeakers ===
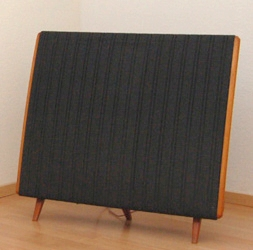
Quad electrostatic speaker

In late 1949 (or early 1950), the company launched the CR corner ribbon loudspeaker. This used a Goodmans Axiom 150 cone loudspeaker for the lower frequencies and an electromagnetic ribbon loudspeaker, designed by Acoustical, for the higher frequencies. Fewer than one thousand units were sold.

In 1957, they released the Quad Electrostatic Loudspeaker (ESL), the first production full frequency range electrostatic loudspeaker renowned for sonic transparency and very low distortion. Its sonic neutrality and transparency were offset by its extreme directionality, moderate power handling, the need for a large room, and moderate bass extension; its novel electrical characteristics could render some amplifiers unstable, which could result in damage to either or both.

The ESL was quickly adopted by the BBC for monitoring the sound quality of their broadcasts. The BBC eventually replaced them with moving coil based monitor speakers developed by several manufacturers, such as the highly successful LS3/5A, that were more easily transported and stored, and were more representative of typical contemporary hi-fi speakers.

Quad launched ESL-63, successor to the original ESL, in 1981. The newer design featured larger panels and an innovative stator design, made up of eight concentric rings fed from the centre outwards through analogue delay lines, so that the audio signal radiated out as though emanating from a single point. Subsequent electrostatic models, the 988/989, the 2805/2905 and then the 2812/2912 were successive refinements of the ESL-63 design, featuring increased power handling and output levels, more sophisticated overload protection, and greater structural rigidity.

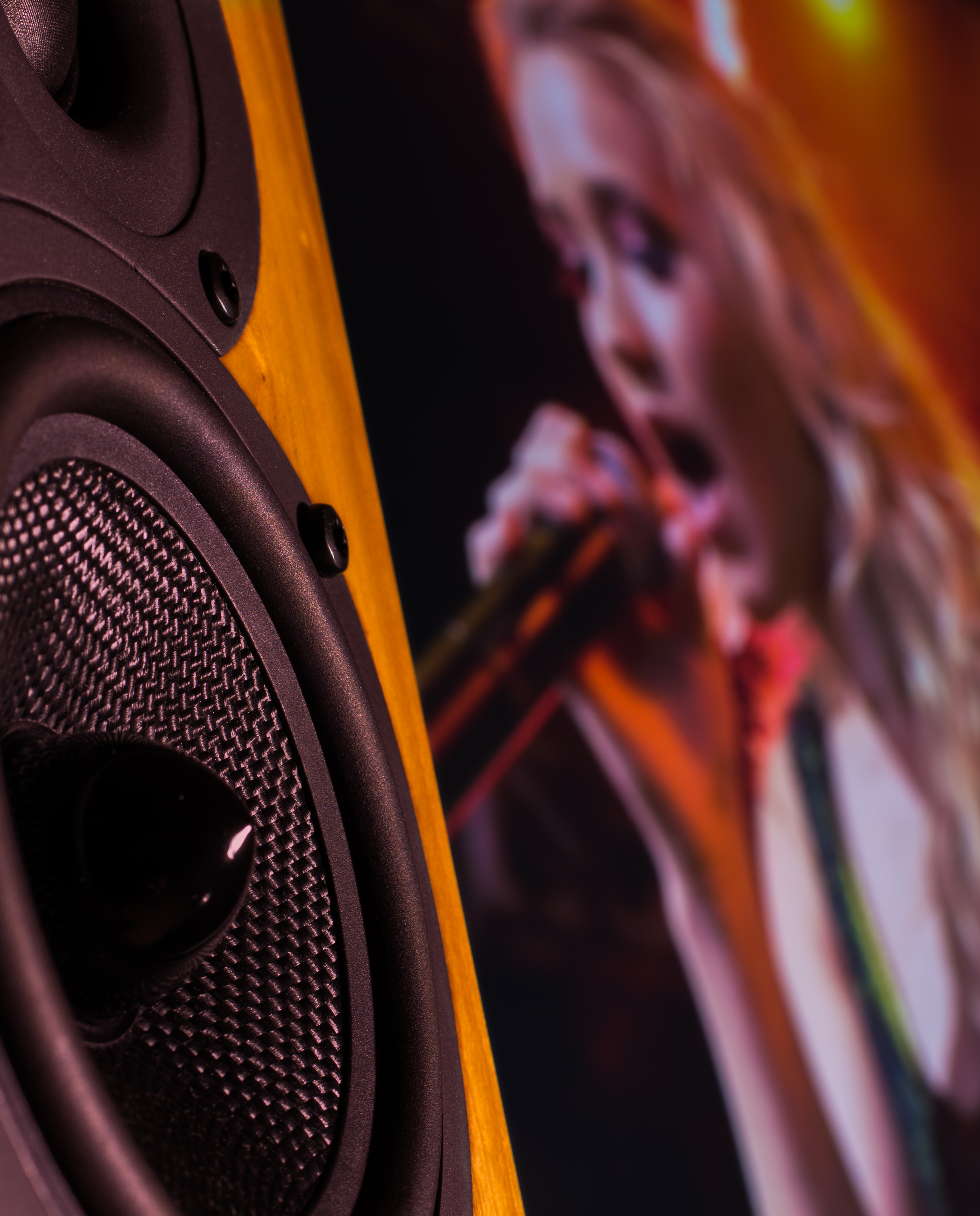
A Quad L-ite satellite speaker provides the audio for a concert at home.

Following the Verity acquisition, Quad developed and market a range of conventional electrodynamic loudspeakers alongside its electrostatic line, available in both passive and active (i.e. featuring in-box amplification) configurations.

Many of Quad's products, including the Quad Electrostatic Loudspeaker (ESL-57), are still serviced by the company's Service Department in Huntingdon.
