= Wharfedale (company) =

English manufacturer of hi-fi loudspeakers

- Company type: Subsidiary
- Industry: Electronics
- Founded: 1932
- Headquarters: Huntingdon, Cambridgeshire, United Kingdom
- Products: Audio visual equipment (currently)
- Owner: IAG Group
- Parent: International Audio Group
- Website: wharfedale.co.uk

Wharfedale is a British audio equipment brand, best known for loudspeakers. It is currently part of the International Audio Group.

Wharfedale also used to brand televisions, DVD players, set-top boxes and Hi-Fi players. Since 2008, they have only manufactured and sold audio equipment.

== History ==
Former logo used until 2017

Wharfedale Wireless Works was founded in 1932 by Gilbert Briggs, and became one of Britain's leading manufacturers of high-end audio equipment, particularly loudspeakers. In addition to winning awards by groups such as the Bradford Radio Society, in mass public testing at Carnegie Hall Wharfedale speakers proved indistinguishable from live music. Innovations introduced by Wharfedale under Briggs included such basics as the two-way loudspeaker and the ceramic magnet. In the 1950s and 1960s, Wharfedale became famous for its technique of eliminating cabinet resonances by using a double cabinet, with the space between the inner and outer shells filled with sand. Purchasers of the loudspeaker systems would receive the appropriate quantity of sand which had been shipped from Wharfedale in England. (Wharfedale in Yorkshire is the site of numerous sand quarries). Briggs sold the company to the Rank Organisation in 1958, and it has been through several owners since then.

== Manufacturing ==
The original manufacturing site was located in Idle, a district of Bradford, West Yorkshire. The current manufacturing site is in Ji'an in China for assembly.

Wharfedale's research and development is located at the IAG UK HQ, in Huntingdon, Cambridgeshire, UK led by Peter Comeau and uses the IAG manufacturing facility in Jian, Jiang-Xi province, China.

The IAG Group factory covers an area of approximately 400,000 square metres. It operates in a ‘raw-material to finished goods’ manufacturing remit, combining with international research and development expertise.

Their inward investment extends to R&D facilities located in Huntingdon, Cambridge, as well as Yokohama, Japan and China’s technology capital, Shenzhen.

== Return to UK manufacturing ==
In February, 2023, Wharfedale announced their first UK-made loudspeaker in over 40 years - the Wharfedale Dovedale.

Dovedale is built in the home of British Hi-Fi at Wharfedale’s UK headquarters in Huntingdon, Cambridgeshire. Incorporating key manufacturing, assembly and finishing processes for specially selected products in addition to the R&D function already located there. A 9,000ft2 production facility has been added to the existing building, including a new anechoic chamber, making a total of 25,000ft2 of office, lab and manufacturing space.

Wharfedale is officially accredited by the 'Made In Britain' organisation, a not-for-profit organisation supporting British manufacturers with the official trademarks. They work with other UK trade bodies, relevant UK government departments and media channels, to promote high quality employment, responsible business, and sustainable economic growth.
