= Luxman =

Japanese audio equipment company

Luxman Corporation ラックスマン株式会社
- Company type: K.K.
- Industry: Electronics
- Founded: Osaka, Japan (1925)
- Headquarters: Yokohama, Kanagawa, Japan
- Key people: Kazuyuki Doi - President, Daniel Chang - Managing Director IAG Group
- Products: Hi-Fi equipment
- Parent: International Audio Group
- Website: www.luxman.com

Luxman is a brand name of Japanese Luxman Corporation (ラックスマン株式会社) that manufactures luxury audio components. Luxman produces a variety of high-end audio products, including turntables, amplifiers, receivers, tape decks, CD players and speakers.

== History ==
Lux Corporation was founded in Japan in June 1925, by T. Hayakawa and his brother K. Yoshikawa. The company began as the radio equipment department of Kinsuido Picture Frame Store in Osaka, until then only an importer of picture frames, and was founded just ahead of the first radio broadcast that year.

At the time, Japanese radio listeners were dependent on technology originating in the United States and Europe. Importing radio equipment and parts was a very forward-looking enterprise for Lux. Lux Corporation later decided that, in order to compete effectively as a supplier, it had to not only sell equipment but manufacture parts in-house to reduce the costs of importing, beginning the creation of the Luxman brand. As a result of this pursuit, Luxman became famous for the output of various quality transformers and switches in Japan, and today is one of the oldest manufacturers in Japan of electronic components.

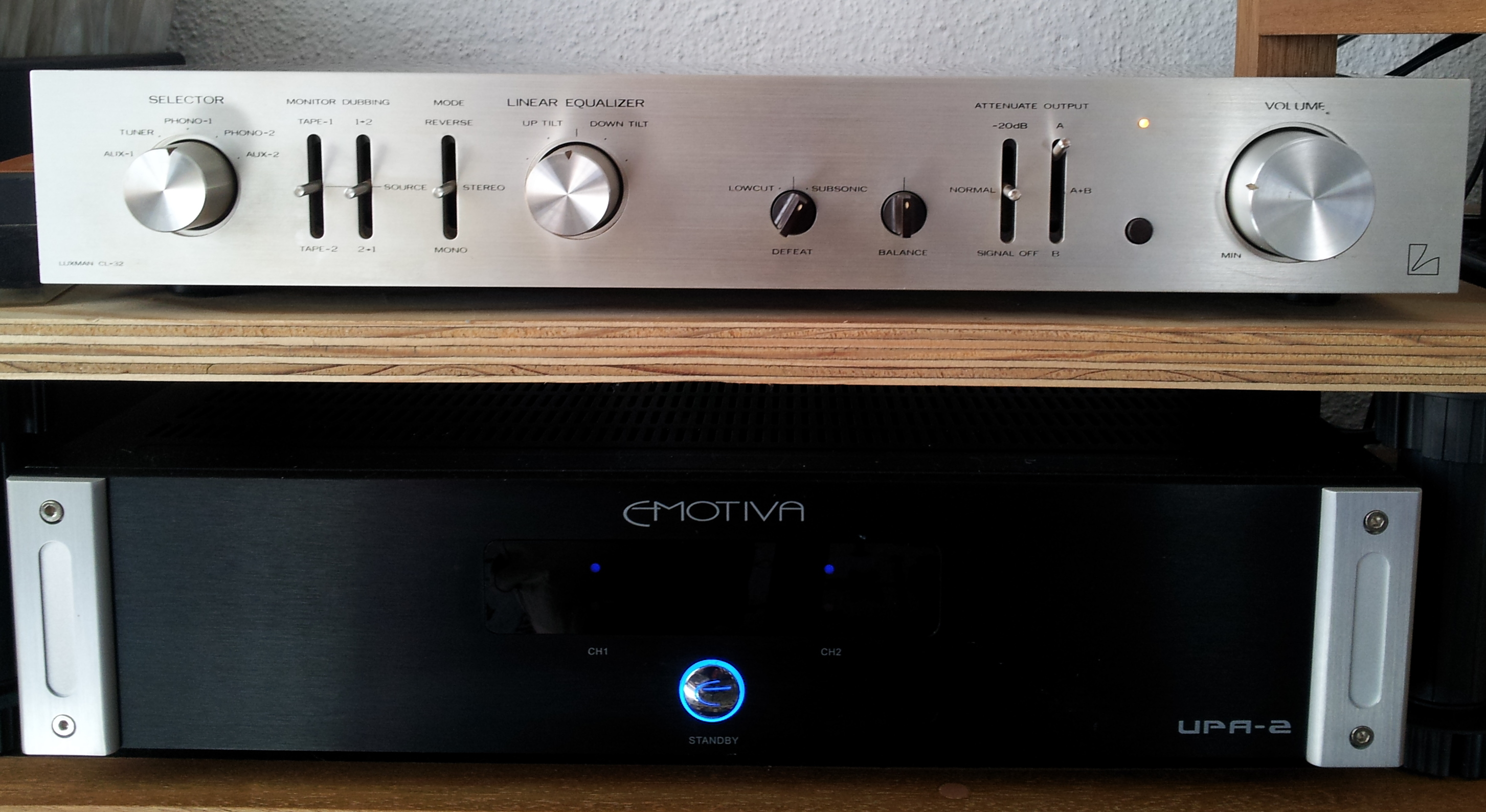
Luxman pre-amplifier CL-32 with tubes (above in an amp-combination)

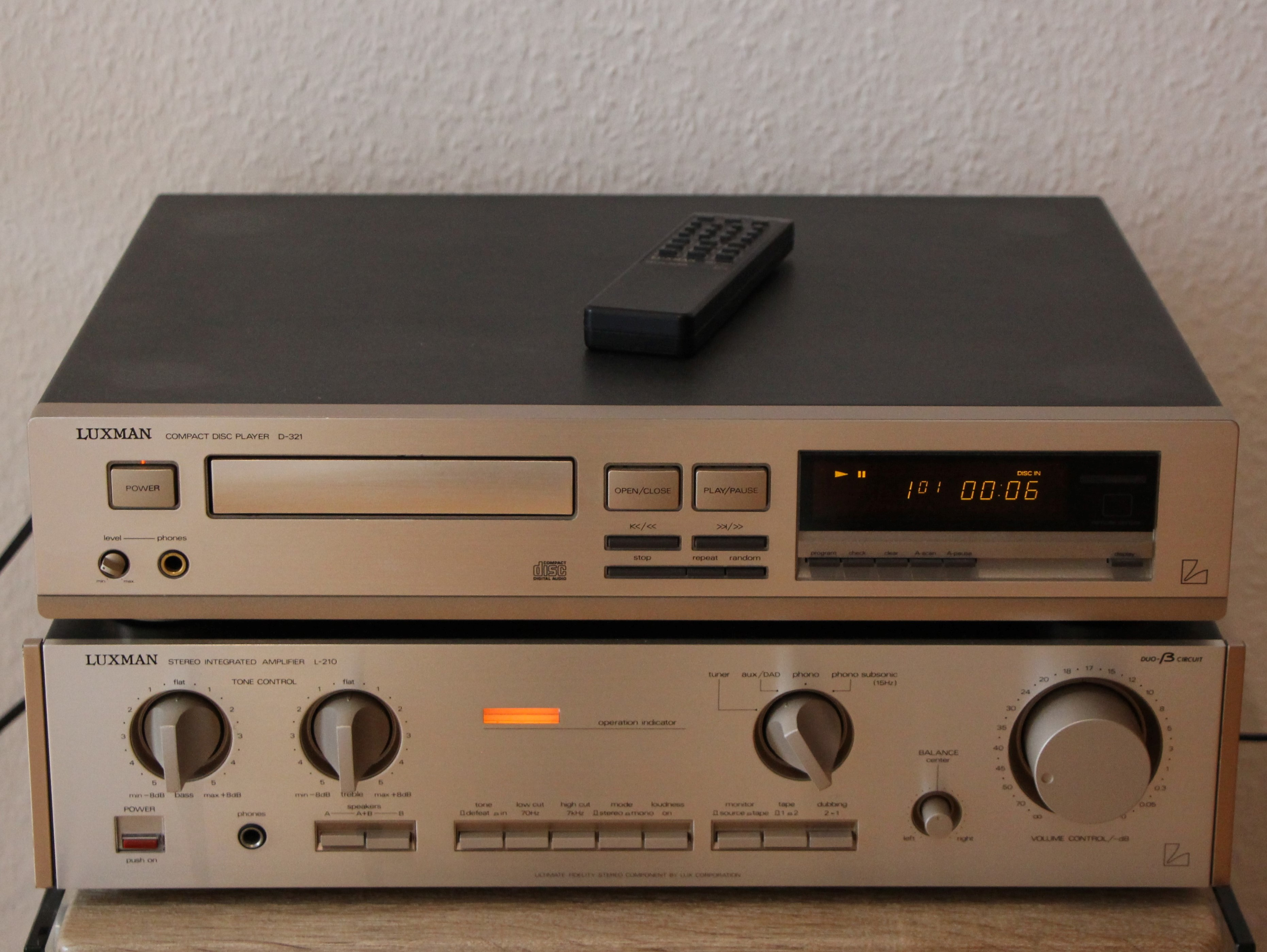
Luxman L-210, amp at entry-level 80s, and D-321, CD player 1992/93

In the mid-1970s and early 1980s. Luxman were primarily specialists in making vacuum tube amplifiers. Preamps and power amps such as the Luxman C-05 and M-05, with their finish, electrical designs (copper interconnects, Class A amp design, separately powered channels with dual AC cables, copper-plated chassis).

An engineer by the name of Atsushi Miura married Mari Yoshikawa (Mr. K. Yoshikawa's eldest daughter) and became a part of the founding 'Luxman' family. Atsushi Miura's father was an audio engineer and was head of Luxman for many years in Japan. In the early 1980s Atsushi took over the reins from his father to run Luxman. Sensing the Japanese audio industry was heading towards cheaper mass-produced components and against the founding philosophy of Luxman, Atsushi sold Luxman to Alpine in 1984, before starting the Airtight audio brand.

In 1984 Luxman became part of Alpine Electronics, another Japanese electronics brand. Alpine, wishing to merge their home hi-fi divisions and Alpage brand with Luxman gear, took corporate actions which nearly bankrupted Luxman. The first of these corporate mistakes was getting Luxman involved in a hi-fi market share war with rival consumer electronics brand Yamaha. Up to the point of the merge, Luxman sold its equipment in specialist independent hi-fi shops. Post-merge, Luxman looked to sell their products to companies such as Costco (United States) and Richer Sounds (UK) in order to compete with Yamaha. This plan resulted in much confusion amongst consumers, as well as their perception of the brand's values. Where Luxman's reputation was in high-end and the often expensive markets, its new distributors had reputations for selling in budget and low-value markets, causing problems for existing dealers and consumers loyal to Luxman's values. The second corporate mistake by Alpine was problems with product branding and poor product planning. While Alpine equipment was seen as "okay" and "acceptable" in most consumers' eyes. The co-branding of cheap and inferior plastic Alpine products with expensive Luxman gear (Luxman equipment was badged Alpine/Luxman) in both Alpine and Luxman factories caused further confusion amongst consumers. This move totally destroyed the image and, ultimately, the sales of Luxman equipment, and the company ended up retreating from all its sales network worldwide except Japan.

Alpine, due to all the troubles it experienced with the Luxman brand, sold it off in 1994. Since that time, the Luxman Corporation has been able to again indulge in its founding objectives. Today the company still produces vacuum tube equipment, as well as SACD/DVD players, and home stereo equipment.

== See also ==
- List of phonograph manufacturers
