= Audio Advice, Inc. =

American consumer electronics retailer

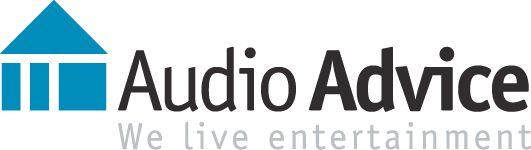
- Type: Private
- Industry: Consumer electronics, retailing, system integration
- Founded: 1978
- Headquarters: 8621 Glenwood Ave., Raleigh, North Carolina with an additional Charlotte, North Carolina area location at 11409 Carolina Place Parkway, Pineville, North Carolina, United States
- Key people: Leon Shaw, founder and chairman, Scott Newnam, president and CEO
- Products: Home theater, home automation, Multi-room audio, high-end audio, lighting control, home security systems, home networking
- Website: www.audioadvice.com

Audio Advice, Inc. is a specialty consumer electronics retailer in the United States, specializing in home and portable audio, home theater, and smart home technology. Audio Advice operates as both a retailer (in-store and online) and custom systems installer/integrator with branches in Raleigh, North Carolina and Charlotte, North Carolina.

== History ==
=== Beginnings ===
In 1978, Leon Shaw founded the firm in Raleigh with original partner Ira Dorne. Shaw graduated from Wake Forest University in 1976 with a degree in economics and spent two years working for Sam Goody before opening the first Audio Advice location at the Brentwood Square shopping center.

==== High-end audio ====
In 1979, Audio Advice opened a high-end audio showroom featuring audio electronics and loudspeakers from Acoustat, Conrad Johnson, Mirage, Series 20 and Denon turntables.

In 1981, the company relocated to Ridgewood Shopping Center. Audio Advice became a dealer representative of Audio Research in 1981.

==== Digital audio and video ====
In 1984, Shaw bought out Dorne to become sole owner. In the mid-1980s, CD players were added.

Lexicon (company) introduced the first Dolby Surround Sound processor in 1988. A Lexicon dealer, Audio Advice became the first store in the Research Triangle area to display a full surround sound system.

In 1989 a full-time custom salesperson was hired to help expand sales of another new product category: whole house audio systems.

==== Home entertainment and automation systems ====
In 1991, Audio Advice moved to Haverty Square Shopping Center. From 1991 to 1995, Shaw served as a board member of the Professional Audio Retailers Association.

After 10 years with the company, in 1994, Randy Cribb became a part owner.

In 1997, Audio Advice began selling the Lutron lighting control system. The company was the first audio/video Triangle dealer to show this category. Also in 1997, Audio Advice installed a high-end home theater in a home in the annual fall Home Builders Association of Raleigh-Wake County Parade of Homes. This was the first home theater featured in a Triangle area Parade home, winning an award for best special feature.

In 1998, Audio Advice began selling Phast whole house home automation systems and the Crestron theater system remote controller, becoming the first Triangle audio/video retailer to showcase the home automation category.

==== Growth and expansion ====
In 2000, Audio Advice moved to Glenwood Avenue. The custom-built 15,000-square-foot (1,400 m^{2}) showroom features dedicated high-end audio listening rooms, home theater rooms, flat panel display demos and demonstrations of lighting control, shading and home automation systems.

In 2004, Leon Shaw was named by Custom Retailer magazine to the C-Business 50 as a "vital influencer" in the home entertainment industry. In the same year, Audio Advice became the Triangle's oldest locally owned audio/video specialty retailer after NOW Audio/Video was bought by Tweeter, a national retail chain.

On December 7 and 8 of 2005, Audio Advice hosted its first Music Matters event: two evenings devoted exclusively to presenting high-performance reproduction of recorded music. Notable industry presenters included John Atkinson of Stereophile magazine and David Wilson and Peter McGrath of Wilson Audio, Karen Sumner of Transparent Audio, plus representatives from Bowers & Wilkins, Classé and others.

In 2006 Leon Shaw was elected to the board of the Home Theater Specialists of America.

Audio Advice acquired Premier Security in 2007, creating Audio Advice Security while adding the home security system option to product offerings. A home networking division was also created in 2007. A satellite home theater demonstration showroom was opened by Audio Advice at Kitchen & Bath Galleries on Glenwood Avenue in 2007.

===== New partner =====
In 2007 Shaw took on a new investor and partner in Scott Newnam, with Shaw becoming board chair and Newnam becoming president and CEO. Newnam is a graduate of Davidson College and Harvard Business School who served as CEO and chairman of the Board of GoldPocket Interactive, an interactive television company, from its founding in 2000 through its sale in 2005 to Tandberg Television.

In 2003, GoldPocket was named one of the "top 20 fastest-growing young technology companies in North America" in the Deloitte and Touche Fast 500 list. In 2004 the company received an Emmy award and Newnam was named to The Hollywood Reporter's Top 20 Next Generation list and TelevisionWeek's Hot List of media executives. In 2005, GoldPocket won the Billboard Television Technology of the Year Award and Newnam was profiled in FastCompany's 100th anniversary issue for his innovations in digital media.

===== Expansion, recognition and development =====
More expansion occurred in 2008 when Audio Advice acquired the Raleigh division of Innovative Systems of Charlotte.

Audio Advice was recognized in 2008 by TWICE (This Week In Consumer Electronics) Magazine, a national electronics industry publication, as a winner of the category Best Audio Video Specialty Retailer in the United States in the magazine's Excellence in Retailing awards.

On November 30 of 2008, Audio Advice hosted a 30th anniversary Music Matters celebration. Notable presenters in attendance included Michael Fremer of Stereophile magazine, David Gordon of Audio Research, Richard Vandersteen of Vandersteen Audio plus representatives from MartinLogan and McIntosh Laboratory, as well as presenters from Bowers & Wilkins and Classé, Era speakers and Peachtree Audio, plus Kaleidescape and Transparent Audio. Zenph Studios CEO John Q. Walker demonstrated his company's "re-performance" technology with a demonstration of their most recent recording, Piano Starts Here by Art Tatum.

In early 2009 the company established an Audio Advice Metrolina office in the Charlotte, North Carolina area. Also in 2009, Audio Advice debuted a demo room dedicated to B&W Group products, including Bowers & Wilkins loudspeakers, Classé audio and video electronics and Rotel audio and video electronics. Audio Advice was recognized in Metro magazine's August 2009 issue as the Standing Ovation Award winner in the MetroBravo awards as Best Place to Buy a Home Media System in the Triangle. In December 2009 the company opened a Charlotte-area showroom in Pineville, North Carolina, on Carolina Place Parkway, near Carolina Place Mall.

Shaw was named vice president of Home Theater Specialists of America for 2009 and served as president of the group, renamed Home Technology Specialists of America, in 2010. In November, Shaw was elected as an HTSA board member for 2011. In the June 4, 2010, issue of Triangle Business Journal, Audio Advice was featured as the small business company profile in the Money Matters section of the weekly regional newspaper. In July 2010, Audio Advice was recognized by Metro magazine as the Standing Ovation Award winner in the MetroBravo awards as Best Place to Buy a Home Media System in the Triangle and the Metro Bravo Award winner as Best Place to Buy a Home Security System. August 2010 saw the company receive additional national recognition with the Retail Excellence Award from Dealerscope magazine.

Audio Advice growth proceeded in 2011 with the acquisition of ZoboTV, a Charlotte-based home technology retailer and integrator. Recognition by Metro magazine readers continued as the company was voted the Triangle area's Best Place to Buy a Home Media System for the sixth consecutive year. Newnam was named to Dealerscope magazine's annual "Forty Under Forty" list of the top home technology influencers under 40 years of age.

In 2012 Newnam was named to Custom Retailer magazine's Young Turks of Custom Electronics for 2012. Reasons given for the honor included leading "design and development of Audio Advice proprietary Signature Series automation system, an industry leader in performance, reliability and ease of use."

===== Expanding to e-commerce =====
In 2015, Audio Advice brought in a team of e-commerce experts and began developing an online shopping experience to mirror the experience customers have grown accustomed to in their stores over the past four decades. This has led to their becoming the fastest growing audio e-commerce website in the US and has vastly expanded their product selection to include more consumer brands and specialty categories including headphones, turntables, and accessories.

== Awards and recognition ==
Audio Advice has been the recipient of numerous manufacturer and industry awards, including:

- Audio Video International Magazine "Best of 30 Hi-Fi, Retailer of the Year" – 1993; "Top Ten Custom Installation Company" – 1998; "Top Ten Retailer of the Year" – 2002; "Manufacturers Elite Award, Retailer of the Year" – 2001 and 2003.
- CEPro Magazine "America's Best Installers" – 2000, 2001; "Top 25 Custom Retailers" – 2002 and 2003.
- HOME BOOK Design Excellence Awards: North Carolina Region: Home Theater Design-Gold, Silver and Bronze Award Winner 2002.
- TWICE Magazine Excellence in Retailing Award winner as Best Audio Video Specialty Retailer in the United States 2008.
- Dealerscope Magazine National Retail Excellence Award winner for 2010.

== Media articles ==
- Triangle Business Journal – May 17, 2002
- Triangle Business Journal – October 5, 2007
- BusinessLeader CharlotteBusiness.com – October 8, 2007 – Audio Advice acquires Premier Security, adds leadership
- SoundstageAV.com – August 2008
- Custom Retailer – September 2008
- TWICE – October 13, 2008
- News & Observer – November 14, 2008
- Triangle Business Journal – December 9, 2008
- TWICE – December 10, 2008
- CEPro.com – December 18, 2008
- "Metro Magazine" – August 2009
- Triangle Business Journal – June 4, 2010 – "Audio Advice on a Sound Foundation"
- Metro Magazine – July 2010
- Dealerscope Magazine – August 2010
- Custom Retailer – December 2010
- Charlotte Business Journal – April 8, 2011
- Metro Magazine – MetroBravo Award Winners Part 2
- Dealerscope Magazine – June 2011
- Custom Retailer – January 2012
