= Newenham =

Newenham may refer to:

People

- Thomas Newenham Deane (1828–1899), Irish architect
- Edward Newenham (1734–1814), Irish politician
- William Newenham Montague Orpen KBE, RA, RHA (1878–1931), Irish artist
- John Newenham Summerson CH CBE (1904–1992), British architectural historian
- George Newenham Wright (1794–1877), Irish writer and Anglican clergyman

Places

- Newenham Abbey, Cistercian abbey founded in 1247 in Axminster, Devon, England
- Cape Newenham LRRS Airport, military airstrip southeast of Cape Newenham, in the U.S. state of Alaska
- Cape Newenham Air Force Station, closed United States Air Force General Surveillance Radar station

== See also ==
- Newnam
- Newnham (disambiguation)
