= Wilson Audio =

American loudspeaker company

Wilson Audio Specialties Inc.
- Type: Private
- Industry: Consumer electronics
- Founded: 1974; 52 years ago in Novato, California
- Founders: David A. Wilson; Sheryl Lee Wilson
- Headquarters: Provo, Utah, United States
- Area served: Worldwide
- Key people: Daryl C. Wilson (CEO); Korbin Vaughn (COO)
- Products: High-end loudspeakers
- Number of employees: 60
- Website: www.wilsonaudio.com

Wilson Audio Specialties Inc. (commonly referred to as Wilson Audio) is an American high-end audio loudspeaker manufacturing company, located in Provo, Utah. Wilson Audio was co-founded by the late David A. Wilson (1944–2018) with his wife Sheryl Lee Wilson in 1974. Until his death, David Wilson was Wilson Audio's Chairman of the Board and Sheryl Lee Wilson served as Vice Chair.

Daily operations at Wilson Audio are currently directed and managed by Dave Wilson's son and successor, Daryl C. Wilson, CEO and Korbin Vaughn, COO. David Wilson continued to work closely with Wilson Audio's R&D and Engineering team in product development until his last days.

== Overview ==
Wilson Audio is known in the audiophile community as offering some of the most expensive speakers in the world. Prior to manufacturing loudspeakers, David Wilson was a staff writer at The Absolute Sound magazine. When Wilson Audio first began offering its products in the early 1980s, the highest priced small "monitor" speaker on the US market was $1,600 per pair; Wilson's small WATT speaker was introduced at $4,400 per pair.

As of 2019, the least expensive stereo speaker from Wilson Audio, the bookshelf-sized TuneTot, is offered from $9,800 US per pair (without isolation base or stands), while their most expensive stereo speakers, the WAMM Master Chronosonic Towers, sell for $850,000 MSRP per pair and up, depending on finish. According to Stereophile in 2015, the average price of Wilson's product range is $69,325 per pair, in standard colors and finishing, and not considering potential extras.

Wilson Audio is known for building highly rigid speaker cabinets. They construct their loudspeaker enclosures from non-wood materials such as phenolic resin composites and epoxy laminates. The cabinets are painted using a high-gloss automotive process in a variety of colors.

The company's record label was called Wilson Audiophile Definitive Recordings and was known for its releases (31 in total) that were issued on LP and CD between 1977 and 1995. In July 2013, Wilson Audio began reissuing high resolution downloads of select titles.

Despite their names, there are no relations between Wilson Audio and the UK-based audio company Wilson Benesch, also a manufacturer of high-end loudspeakers.

== Products ==
Many Wilson Audio product names include acronyms formed from the initial letters of a phrase (shown in parentheses).

=== Current lineup ===
- WASAE Center Channel (Wilson Audio Special Applications Engineering)
  - Series 1 (Released: 2023)
- Mezzo CSC (Convergent Synergy Carbon)
  - Series 1 (Released: 2023)
- Alida CSC (2-channel, 5.1, 7.1, and Atmos compatible)
  - Series 1 (Released: 2023)
- The WATT/Puppy
  - Series 1 (Released: 2024)
- Alexia V
  - Series 1 (Released: 2022)
- Sasha V
  - Series 1 (Released: 2023)
- TuneTot
  - Series 1 (Released: 2018)
- Chronosonic XVX
  - Series 1 (Released: 2019)
  - 4 Seasons (Released: 2022)
- Wilson Audio Subsonic
  - Series 1 (Released: 2019)
- ActivXO (Active Crossover; Dual Subwoofer Controller)
  - Series 1 (Released: 2019)
- Sabrina V
  - Series 1 (Released: 2025)
- Alexx V
  - Series 1 (Released: 2021)
  - Vfx (Released: 2024)
- LōKē
  - Series 1 (Released: 2022)
- Submerge
  - Series 1 (Released: 2023)
- Autobiography
  - Series 1 (Released: 2026)

=== Retired products ===
- SMART Turntable
  - (Released: 1974) (Retired: 1976)
- WAMM (Wilson Audio Modular Monitor)
  - Series 1 (Released: 1981) (Retired: 1982)
  - Series 2 (Released: 1982) (Retired: 1983)
  - Series 3A (Released: 1983) (Retired: 1987)
  - Series 6 (Released: 1988) (Retired: 1991)
  - Series 7 (Released: 1992) (Retired: 2003)
  - Series 7A (Released: 1992) (Retired: 2003)
- WATT (Wilson Audio Tiny Tot)
  - Series 1 (Released: 1986) (Retired: 1989)
  - Series 2 (Released: 1989) (Retired: 1991)
  - Series 3 (Released: 1991) (Retired: 1994)
  - Series 5 (Released: 1994) (Retired: 1999)
  - Series 6 (Released: 1999) (Retired: 2002)
  - Series 7 (Released: 2002) (Retired: 2006)
  - Series 8 (Released: 2006) (Retired: 2011)
- WHOW (Wilson High Output Woofer)
  - Series 1 (Released: 1989) (Retired: 1991)
  - Series 2 (Released: 1991) (Retired: 1993)
  - Series 3 (Released: 1993) (Retired: 2002)
- Puppy
  - Series 1 (Released: 1989) (Retired: 1991)
  - Series 2 (Released: 1991) (Retired: 1994)
  - Series 5 & 5.1 (Released: 1994) (Retired: 1999)
  - Series 6 (Released: 1999) (Retired: 2002)
  - Series 7 (Released: 2002) (Retired: 2006)
  - Series 8 (Released: 2006) (Retired: 2011)
- X-1 Grand SLAMM (Super Linear Adjustable Modular Monitor)
  - Series 1 (Released: 1993) (Retired: 1997)
  - Series 2 (Released: 1997) (Retired: 1999)
  - Series 3 (Released: 2000) (Retired: 2003)
  - Level 5 (Released: 2006)
- WITT (Wilson Integrated Transducer Technology)
  - Series 1 (Released: 1995) (Retired: 1997)
  - Series 2 (Released: 1997) (Retired: 2000)
- XS Subwoofer
  - Series 1 (Released: 1996) (Retired: 2005)
- CUB (Center Unitized Bass)
  - Series 1 (Released: 1997) (Retired: 2000)
  - Series 2 (Released: 2000) (Retired: 2005)
- MAXX
  - Series 1 (Released: 1998) (Retired: 2004)
  - Series 2 (Released: 2004) (Retired: 2008)
  - Series 3 (Released: 2008) (Retired: 2015)
- WATCH Center Channel (Wilson Audio Theater Comes Home)
  - Series 1 (Released: 2000) (Retired: 2010)
  - Series 2 (Released: 2007) (Retired: 2011)
  - Series 3 (Released: 2011) (Retired: 2023)
- Surround Speaker
  - Series 1 (Released: 2000) (Retired: 2009)
  - Series 2 (Released: 2007) (Retired: 2014)
- WATCH Dog (Wilson Audio Theater Comes Home)
  - Series 1 (Powered) (Released: 2001) (Retired: 2003)
  - Series 2 (Powered) (Released: 2003) (Retired: 2008)
  - Passive (Released: 2006) (Retired: 2023)
- Sophia
  - Series 1 (Released: 2001) (Retired: 2009)
  - Series 2 (Released: 2005) (Retired: 2012)
  - Series 3 (Released: 2010) (Retired: 2016)
- Alexandria X-2
  - Series 1 (Released: 2003) (Retired: 2009)
  - Series 2 (Released: 2009) (Retired: 2012)
  - XLF (Cross Load Firing) (Released: 2012) (Retired: 2019)
- Duette
  - Series 1 (Released: 2006) (Retired: 2014)
  - Series 2 (Released: 2013) (Retired: 2020)
- Sasha W/P (WATT/Puppy)
  - Series 1 (Released: 2009) (Retired: 2014)
  - Series 2 (Released: 2014) (Retired: 2018)
  - Series DAW (David Andrew Wilson) (Released: 2018) (Retired: 2023)
- Polaris
  - Series 1 (Released: 2010) (Retired: 2020)
  - C/S (Released: 2014) (Retired: 2020)
- Sabrina
  - Series 1 (Released: 2015) (Retired: 2020)
  - SabrinaX (Released: 2020) (Retired: 2025)
- Alexx
  - Series 1 (Released: 2016) (Retired: 2021)
- Alexia
  - Series 1 (Released: 2012) (Retired: 2017)
  - Series 2 (Released: 2017) (Retired: 2022)
- Thor's Hammer
  - Series 1 (Released: 2008) (Retired: 2023)
- Alida Series 1 (2-channel, 5.1, 7.1, and Atmos compatible)
  - Titanium Dome (Released: 2014) (Retired: 2023)
  - C/S (Released: 2014) (Retired: 2023)
- Mezzo
  - Series 1 (Released: 2011) (Retired: 2023)
  - C/S (Released: 2013) (Retired: 2023)
- Yvette
  - Series 1 (Released: 2016) (Retired: 2024)
- WAMM Master Chronosonic (Wilson Audio Modular Monitor)
  - Series 1 (Released: 2017) (Retired 2026)
- WAMM Master Subsonic (Wilson Audio Modular Monitor)
  - Series 1 (Released: 2017) (Retired 2026)
