= Dynagroove =

Recording process

Dynagroove is a recording process introduced in 1963 by RCA Victor that, for the first time, used analog computers to modify the audio signal used to produce master discs for LPs. The intent was to boost bass on quiet passages, and reduce the high-frequency tracing burdens (distortion) for the less-compliant, "ball" or spherical-tipped playback cartridges then in use. With boosted bass, tracing demands could be reduced in part by reduced recording levels, sometimes supplemented by peak compression. This added top-end margin permitted selective pre-emphasis of some passages for greater perceived (psychological) brilliance of the recording as a whole. As with any compander, the program material itself changed the response of the Dynagroove electronics that processed it. But, because the changes were multiple (bass, treble, dynamic range) and algorithmic (thresholds, gain curves), RCA referred to the analog device as a computer.

== Marketing claims ==
RCA claimed that Dynagroove had the effect of adding brilliance and clarity, realistic presence, full-bodied tone and virtually eliminated surface noise and inner groove distortion. In addition, Dynagroove recordings were mastered on RCA magnetic tape. Hans H. Fantel (who wrote liner notes on the first Dynagroove releases) summed it up with, "[Dynagroove] adds up to what is, in my opinion, a remarkable degree of musical realism. The technique is ingenious and sophisticated, but its validation is simple: the ear confirms it!"

== Reception, changing technology and obsolescence ==
The Dynagroove process was not well-received by some industry commentators, with many audio engineers of the time referring to Dynagroove as "Grindagroove". The process was also sharply criticized by Goddard Lieberson, head of Columbia Records, RCA Victor's main competitor. Lieberson called Dynagroove "a step away from the faithful reproduction of the artist's performance;" and by Harry Pearson, founder of The Absolute Sound, who termed it "Dynagroove, for that wooden sound." Another noted detractor of Dynagroove was J. Gordon Holt, the founder of Stereophile magazine, who in December 1964 wrote a highly unfavourable article entitled "Down with Dynagroove!" Holt, a noted audio engineer and writer of the 1960s and 1970s, slammed Dynagroove as introducing "pre-distortion" into the mastering process, making the records sound worse if they were played on high-quality phono systems.

Holt was technically correct, as the Dynagroove process used tracing compensation, which pre-distorted the record groove to cancel out the distortion created by playback with a conical-shaped phonograph stylus, which could not track the record groove accurately in the high frequencies, especially in the inner grooves of an LP. The process worked well with playback via a conical stylus, typical of most phonograph cartridges prior to about 1964. However, if one played a Dynagroove record with an elliptical-shaped stylus, this pre-distortion became audible. As the 1960s progressed, elliptical styli were increasingly used in high quality playback cartridges. This development made tracing compensation obsolete by about 1970 and RCA quietly abandoned the use of Dynagroove.

== Dynamic equalization ==
The other technique used with Dynagroove was a dynamic equalizer, which varied the tonal quality of the recording according to the loudness of the sound. Loud passages were reproduced with little tonal change, but softer passages had boosted lows and highs. Harry Olson, RCA's chief engineer, advocated the use of dynamic equalization for two reasons: the process would help keep softer musical passages above the noise floor of the LP disc; and music processed through the dynamic equalizer would, in theory, tend to have a tonal balance closer to what the listener would hear in a live performance. This latter characteristic was based on Olson's work comparing consumer playback of recorded music to live musical performance. Olson found that most people listened to records at sound levels about 20 decibels lower than actual live performances. Human hearing is not linear with level change, but tends to perceive softer sounds as having less bass content. The dynamic equalizer was an attempt to compensate for the reduction in bass that would be perceived by listening to records at typical levels. As noted above, critical reaction to this technique was mixed. RCA stopped using dynamic equalization about the same time they stopped using tracing compensation in 1970.

== Dynagroove promotional and regular records ==
Partial list

- Van Cliburn/Fritz Reiner/Chicago Symphony Orchestra Beethoven: Piano Concerto no. 4 in G major, op 58. 1963 original RCA, Made in Germany shortly after under LSC-2680-B (stereo) and LM-2680-C (mono)
- This Is Dynagroove! (1963) PRS-140*
1. Sid Ramin – "Swanee"
2. Marty Gold – "I'll Remember April"
3. Dick Schory – "Take the "A" Train"
4. Hugo & Luigi Chorus – "I Love You"
5. Peter Nero – "Granada"
6. Arthur Fiedler/Boston Pops – "Star Dust"
7. Erich Leinsdorf/Boston Symphony – "Mahler: Symphony No. 1 (Finale)"
8. Arthur Fiedler/Boston Pops – "La Sorella"
9. Charles Münch/Boston Symphony Orchestra – "Debussy: Nocturnes, Fêtes"
10. Leontyne Price & Richard Tucker – "Puccini: Madama Butterfly Act 1: Love Duet"
11. Morton Gould – "Sibelius: Findlandia (Finale)"
- The Sound Of Tomorrow (Buick Highlighter) (1963) SP-33-204/SPS-33-204*
1. Peter Nero – "Londonderry Air"
2. Marty Gold – "Shangri-La"
3. Hugo & Luigi Chorus – "I'll See You In My Dreams"
4. Dick Schory – "Stompin' At The Savoy"
5. Sid Ramin – "Spring Is Here"
6. Erich Leinsdorf/Boston Symphony – "Scherzo from Symphony No. 1 in D (Mahler)"
7. Arthur Fiedler/Boston Pops – "Jalousie"
8. Robert Shaw Chorale – "Battle Hymn of the Republic"
9. Charles Münch/Boston Symphony – "Pavan for a Dead Princess (Ravel)"
10. Leontyne Price – "Un Bel Di from Madama Butterfly (Puccini)"
- The New Sound of the Stars (1963) SP-33-223/SPS-33-223*
1. Sid Ramin – "The Syncopated Clock"
2. Perry Como – "The Songs I Love"
3. Chet Atkins – "Back Home Again In Indiana"
4. Hugo & Luigi Chorus – "Melody of Love"
5. Eddy Arnold – "The Streets of Laredo"
6. Floyd Cramer – "Green Door"
7. Marty Gold – "Don't Worry 'Bout Me"
8. Jim Reeves – "(There'll Be Blue Birds Over) The White Cliffs of Dover"
9. Peter Nero – "Are My Dreams Real?"
10. The Limeliters – "Drill Ye Tarriers"
11. Sam Cooke – "Nobody Knows The Trouble I've Seen"
12. Al Hirt – "Man With A Horn"
- Miklos Rosza/RCA Italiana Orchestra – Rozsa conducts Rozsa (1965) LSC-2802
- Dimensions In Dynagroove (1965) PRS-180*
1. Sid Ramin – "I'm Looking Over A Four Leaf Clover"
2. Melachrino Strings & Orchestra – "In The Blue Of Evening"
3. Si Zentner – "Twist and Shout"
4. Marty Gold – "Theme from 'A Summer Place'"
5. Frankie Carle – "Dominique"
6. Hugo Montenegro – "Candy's Theme"
7. The Norman Luboff Choir – "Never on Sunday"
8. Morton Gould – "The Peanut Vendor"
9. Robert Brereton/Paramount Theatre Organ – "Gayne (Khachaturian): Sabre Dance"
10. Arthur Fielder/Boston Pops – "Grand Canyon Suite (Grofé): Cloudburst"
11. Arthur Fielder/Boston Pops – "Tenderly"
12. Erich Leinsdorf/Boston Symphony – "Firebird Suite (Stravinsky): Finale"
- Sounds Fantastic! (1966) PRS-210*
1. Sid Ramin – "Strike Up The Band"
2. Si Zentner – "Fly Me To The Moon (In Other Words)"
3. Marty Gold – "Smile"
4. Claus Ogerman – "Watusi Trumpets"
5. Chet Atkins – "Armen's Theme"
6. Dick Schory – "From Russia With Love"
7. Johnny Douglas/Living Strings – "Love Your Spell Is Everywhere"
8. Al Hirt – "I Had The Craziest Dream"
9. Frankie Randall – "A Wonderful Day Like Today"
10. Living Guitars – "Steel Guitar Rag"
11. The Three Suns – "Love Letters In The Sand"
12. Esquivel – "Bye Bye Blues"
- Questo è il Dynagroove ! (1966) DDD 33* Italy
1. Charles Münch (conductor) – From Tchaikovsky's Sixth Symphony (Pathétique)
2. Alfredo Kraus – La donna è mobile from Verdi's Rigoletto
3. Arthur Rubinstein – Chopin's Polonaise No. 6
4. Erich Leinsdorf – Rakoczy March from Berlioz's La Damnation de Faust
5. Marty Gold – I'll remember April
6. Ennio Morricone – Quando quando quando
7. Ferruccio Tagliavini – Leoncavallo's Mattinata
8. The SAT Choir – Preghiera a Sant'Antonio
9. Miranda Martino – Non dimenticar le mie parole
10. Morton Gould and his symphonic orchestra – Espana cani

* Stereo first regular records
