= J. Gordon Holt =

American audio engineer

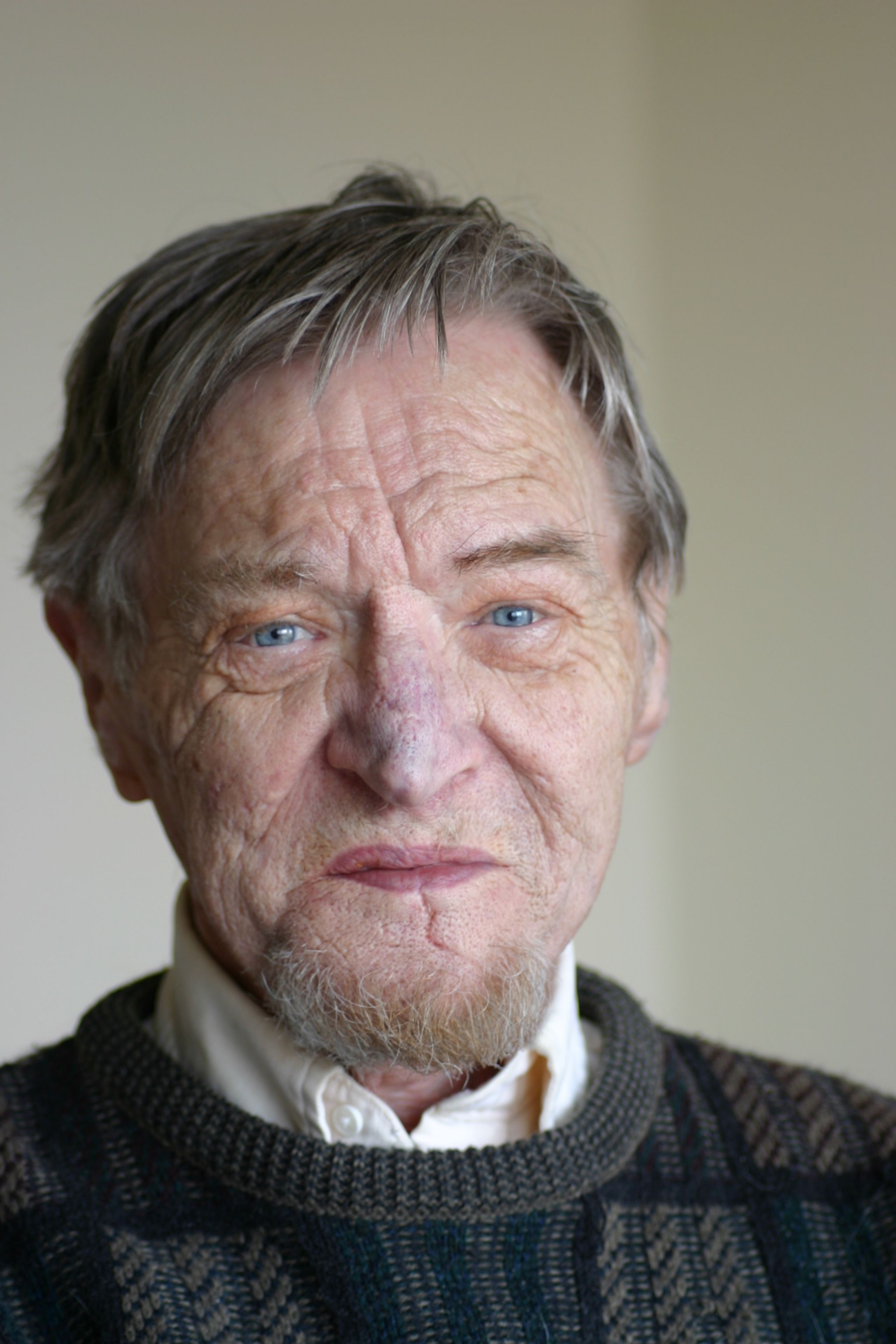
J. Gordon Holt in 2005

Justin Gordon Holt (19 April 1930 – 20 July 2009) was an audio engineer and the founder of Stereophile magazine, and is widely considered to be the founder of the high-end audio movement, which promoted the philosophy of judging sound quality by subjective tests, generally with "cost no object" sound components, including loudspeakers, turntables, amplifiers, vacuum tube components, cables, and other devices. Known as "JGH" (from his byline in published reviews and articles), Holt established a reputation for veracity, often-controversial opinions, passionate critiques, and journalistic integrity. He also pioneered the concept of the yearly "Recommended Components" list, providing a thumbnail summary of reviews for audiophiles looking for the finest sound components available at any price. Holt also came up with "Holt's Law," the theory that the better the recording, the worse the musical performance—and vice versa.

== Early years ==
Justin Gordon Holt was born on April 19, 1930, in Charlotte, North Carolina, and adopted when he was two years of age by Justin Gordon Holt (Sr.) and his wife Katherine (née Hart). Through DNA testing and genealogy research, Holt's son was able to confirm that Gordon was from the Beam and Houser families of North Carolina. His family moved to Melbourne, Australia in 1937 for his father's work, and stayed there through World War II. From 1936 to 1946 Gordon attended the prestigious Melbourne private school Scotch College, returning to the U.S. after his father's sudden death from a stroke on 9 August 1946. J. Gordon Holt's father bore such a striking resemblance to famed gangster Al Capone that he was stopped and questioned by a customs official. During his years in Australia his mother worked as the head of the USO for the Australian Red Cross, and his father worked for a textile company.

Gordon attended Nether Providence High School in Wallingford, Pennsylvania, and attended Lehigh University with the intent of becoming an engineer. After discovering he "couldn't hack the math," Gordon switched his major to Journalism. He graduated in 1953 with a BA. He spent a few years struggling as a cartoonist, and writing the occasional article for High Fidelity magazine, which later offered him a position.

== Family ==
Gordon married Mary Elizabeth "Polly" Norton on May 25, 1968, in Swarthmore, Pennsylvania. Their first child, Alicia Darroch Holt, was born on January 21, 1970. Their second child, Justin Charles Holt, was born on April 18, 1972. The Holt family moved to Santa Fe, New Mexico, in 1979, after taking a trip and falling in love with the area. Mary and Gordon underwent a separation in 1983, with Mary and their children moving to Boulder, Colorado, and Gordon remaining in Santa Fe. Mary was diagnosed with lung cancer in August 1988, and died on March 19, 1989. During this time, Gordon moved to Boulder to care for her and their children, and spent the rest of his life there.

== Stereophile magazine ==
Holt worked as an editor and critic for Audiocraft and High Fidelity magazines in the mid-1950s through the early 1960s, and wrote numerous articles and reviews on amplifiers, receivers, turntables, tape recorders, and other high-fidelity sound components. After departing the magazine over editorial differences—what he later claimed were disputes between High Fidelity's editorial and advertising staff—Holt founded Stereophile magazine in 1962 while living in Great Barrington, Massachusetts. The magazine quickly established a market over the next decade, expanding from a small pamphlet-sized, hand-typed booklet to issues approaching a hundred pages. Holt was one of the first audio critics to provide in-depth details on his listening environment, with details on room acoustics, microphones, and other technical matters, departing from the mass-market slant of competitors such as Stereo Review, Audio Magazine, and his alma mater High Fidelity.

Holt's engaging writing style and emphasis on audio engineering made his articles authoritative while still remaining accessible to consumers and audiophiles. "JGH" (as he referred to himself in print) was often skeptical of wildly successful audio components such as Bose speakers, and often created controversy with passionate reviews and articles on a variety of technical subjects. The high-end audio movement exploded during the 1970s, with manufacturers such as Audio Research, Magnepan, Infinity, and many others finding great success among well-heeled customers during the decade. After a move to Santa Fe, New Mexico, where Holt constructed an elaborate listening and audio testing room in his home, he spent the decade covering such cutting-edge developments as Dynagroove, Quadraphonic sound, magnetic tape formats, and digital sound, and also reviewed hundreds of audio components. Holt also developed a vocabulary to describe subtle differences between audio components, using terms like "warm" or "harsh" to describe different characters and tonalities. (Holt later wrote "The Audio Glossary", which clarified and defined many of these terms for the benefit of audiophiles and enthusiasts.)

By the late 1970s, Stereophile's own success led to business difficulties, chiefly in getting the magazine distributed on a regular schedule, which created a myriad of financial problems. Holt sold the magazine to businessman Larry Archibald in 1982 for $5,000 (paid in fifty $100 bills), who expanded the magazine, hired a large staff, and eventually increased Stereophile's circulation to 60,000 readers by the late 1980s. The magazine was sold to Petersen Publishing in June 1998.

The success of Stereophile in the late 1960s and early 1970s inspired New York writer & reviewer Harry Pearson to start a rival publication, The Absolute Sound, which quickly became a very influential high-end magazine. Pearson, who was an avid admirer of Holt's early work, has stated that he started The Absolute Sound because he wanted to "prompt Gordon to more consistent production of his own [magazine]." TAS (as it was called) embraced the so-called "subjective audio" philosophy, which placed an emphasis on the sound of components as a system, eschewing the technical measurements used by Stereo Review and other mass-market magazines. TAS and Stereophile were arguably the Time magazine and Newsweek of the high-end audio industries throughout the 1970s and 1980s, and both thrived on highly critical reviews, editorials, and articles which tended to polarize readers and advertisers.

Holt tried to start a new publication in the late 1980s, LaserNews, a newsletter intended to cover the emerging home video industry of VCRs, laserdisc players, and large-screen television technology. He was unable to interest the Stereophile management in video-related topics, and kept the magazine going until about 1990, where he folded it due to ongoing business and distribution problems. Stereophile belatedly started a video-related magazine in 1994, Stereophile Guide to Home Theater, which continues online as Ultimate A/V.

Holt occasionally wrote reviews for both Stereophile and Absolute Sound in the 1990s, and was a frequent visitor to the annual Consumer Electronic Shows throughout the decade. Holt frequently expressed bitterness that the high-end audio business refused to embrace double blind testing, which he was convinced would legitimize the scientific process of evaluating sound quality, for example stating in 2007 that "As far as the real world is concerned, high-end audio lost its credibility during the 1980s, when it flatly refused to submit to the kind of basic honesty controls (double-blind testing, for example) that had legitimized every other serious scientific endeavor since Pascal." Holt resigned from Stereophile in 1999 to pursue freelance writing, but remained an active participant in the Audio Engineering Society and other industry organizations.

== Death ==
J. Gordon Holt was as well known for his smoking as he was for his passionate writing, and smoked two-and-a-half packs a day starting when he was seventeen. He was diagnosed with tonsil cancer shortly after his wife's death in 1990, and had a successful surgery shortly thereafter, although he continued to smoke believing that the cancer was likely to kill him anyway. Ten years later, Holt was diagnosed with emphysema. He quit smoking, but it took his life on July 20, 2009. He died at home with his daughter and son present.
