= Harry Pearson (audio critic) =

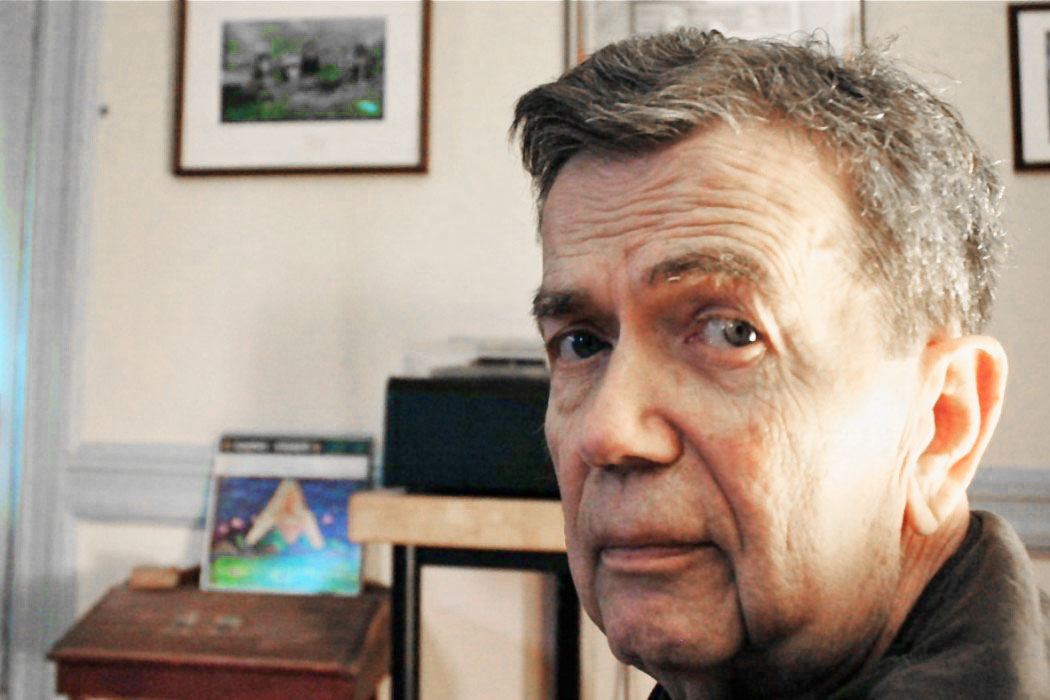
- Born: Harry Hall Pearson, Jr. January 5, 1937; North Wilkesboro, North Carolina, U.S.
- Died: November 4, 2014 (aged 77); Sea Cliff, New York, U.S.
- Education: Duke University
- Occupations: Journalist, audio reviewer, publisher
- Writing career
- Subject: High fidelity
- Notable work: The Absolute Sound

Harry Hall Pearson, Jr. (January 5, 1937 – November 4, 2014), known to his readers as HP, was an American journalist, audio reviewer, and publisher who founded The Absolute Sound magazine for high-end audio enthusiasts. Pearson is considered the most influential figure in the history of audiophile journalism. Pearson is famous for his philosophy of judging the sound of an audio component on how closely it approximates the "absolute sound", which he defined as "the sound of actual acoustic instruments playing in a real space."

== Early years ==
Harry Hall Pearson, Jr. was born on January 5, 1937, in North Wilkesboro, North Carolina to Harry Pearson (Sr.) and his wife Joyce (née Welborn). Pearson lived in North Wilkesboro until his parents' divorce in 1947. After the divorce, Harry and his younger sister moved to Charlotte, N.C., to live with their mother. After completing high school in Charlotte, Harry attended Duke University. After graduating from Duke University, Harry became a newspaper reporter and columnist, writing for several prominent publications in North Carolina, Tennessee, and Arkansas.

In Arkansas, Pearson was an environmental investigative reporter for the Pine Bluff Commercial where he wrote a series of articles that were influential in the campaign to save the Buffalo National River. Harry left the Pine Bluff Commercial when he was recruited by Bill Moyers to become the environmental writer for Newsday in New York. Pearson was nominated for a Pulitzer Prize during his time at Newsday.

== The Absolute Sound ==
While working at Newsday, Harry started an underground magazine for audiophiles from his Victorian home in Sea Cliff, N.Y. The first issue of The Absolute Sound appeared in the spring of 1973 with Pearson acting as editor-in-chief and publisher. Under Pearson, TAS was published every other month from 1973 until the 1990s. Pearson decided to name his magazine after the philosophy behind the idea of an "absolute sound", which he defined as the "sound of actual acoustic instruments playing in a real space." In his reviews, Pearson established the principle that an objective audio review is not a matter of taste, but that the "absolute sound" should be the standard in evaluating the qualities of components or recordings. In the early years, TAS accepted no advertising from manufacturers. Pearson stated that one's reaction to that criteria could be termed as "subjective," but the observation of how music sounded in real life, and one's familiarity of that was not subjective, but objective, which is what reviews were based upon.

In reaction to the prevailing mode of audio reviewing at the time, Pearson and TAS reviewed audio equipment based on how it sounded and not relying on measurements. This subjective style of audio reviewing was similar to that of J. Gordon Holt, the founder of the audiophile magazine Stereophile. Pearson has often stated that Holt served as the inspiration for him becoming an audio reviewer and starting TAS. Along with Holt, Pearson developed a new language to describe what he was hearing and thus influenced a generation of audiophiles and manufacturers in their pursuit of better sound. According to The New York Times, Pearson "laid the foundations of a philosophy and vocabulary that helped give rise to a worldwide subculture of high-end audiophiles... He wrote about recorded music with the conviction and nuance that food critics brought to haute cuisine." During the rise of digital and the CD, Pearson and TAS remained highly critical of the digital sound technologies. In a 1992 article in The New York Times, Edward Rothstein characterized Pearson as an "unofficial spokesman for an impassioned rear guard, a group of music lovers of extreme views, an organization of Luddite fanatics... I am one of them."

Beginning with TAS Issue #4, Pearson began printing a list of his reference recordings that he dubbed the Super Disc List. He continued to publish the list annually with updates and new additions. The Super Disc List was revered by his readers and has been credited with driving up the market prices for certain LPs that continually appeared on the list, such as RCA Shaded Dog pressings and the original pressing of the soundtrack to the 1967 film Casino Royale. Titles from his Super Disc List are continually being reissued by audiophile record companies around the world.

Beginning in the early 1990s TAS began to experience financial and operational troubles due to mismanagement and the magazine began to struggle to fulfill subscriptions. In 1998, TAS was purchased by Tom Martin, who moved the magazine to Austin, TX. It continues to be published in print and online today (10 issues per year). After relinquishing control of the magazine, Pearson continued to write for TAS in a column called HPsWorkshop, which he published until his departure from the magazine in 2012. On August 31, 2012, Pearson quit TAS. After leaving TAS, Pearson co-founded an online audio journal and newsletter with his protégé Joseph Weiss, called HPSoundings. HPSoundings eventually folded after two years due to Pearson's declining health.

== Influence ==
Over the years, Pearson's influence help substantiate new audio companies in the audiophile community. A good review by Pearson could lead to success, as was the case with manufacturers, such as Nordost Corporation, VPI, Conrad-Johnson and Magnepan, all becoming successful companies that continue to operate today. Likewise, a negative review by Pearson could be harmful for a new or established company. Many of the leading audiophile reviewers of today, including Jonathan Valin (TAS), Michael Fremer (Stereophile, Analog Planet), Art Dudley (Stereophile), and Roy Gregory (The Audio Beat) began their career working under Pearson. According to reviewer Roy Gregory, Pearson's "real importance was as a reviewer who defined what a reviewer was, and his legacy lies in the hands of the reviewing community."

== Death ==
On November 4, 2014, Pearson died in his home in Sea Cliff, New York. At the time of his death, Pearson was in frail health following a series of heart and circulatory ailments.
