= William James West =

- Born: 1793; Wadenhoe, North Northamptonshire County; England
- Died: 1848 (aged 54–55); Tonbridge, Kent County; England
- Education: Possibly Guy's Hospital
- Known for: Describe the West Syndrome
- Spouse: Mary Halsey Dashwood
- Children: Julia, William Robert, James Edwin

William James West (1793–1848), was an English surgeon and apothecary, who among other things took a prominent role in the local movement of reform of medical practice. He published in 1837 the first article referred to an ovariectomy performed in England and first described the picture of a kind of infantile spasm (present in his own son, James Edwin West) in an article published by The Lancet in 1841. Today, this syndrome is typically characterized by three findings: epileptic spasms, psychomotor retardation and electroencephalogram with a characteristic layout of hypsarrhythmia, although one of the three may not appear.

== Biography ==
William James West was son of Reverend William West and his wife Elizabeth Lomax and was baptised in Wadenhoe in 1793, July 9. As an orphan he grew up and was apprenticed at his uncle, James Wright Lomax, surgeon-apothecary in London. After his apprenticeship he worked for a while at High Wycombe and St. Albans. It is believed that he also received medical training at Guy's Hospital in London, and it is known that he was admitted to the Royal College of Surgeons in February 1815. At around 1823 he settled in Tonbridge, Kent, as a practitioner and was also politically and socially engaged.

West married Mary Halsey Dashwood in June 1828 in the St Giles' Church, district of Camberwell, London. She was born at Southborough, Kent, as daughter of Robert Dashwood and Hannah Halsey on 12 February 1809 and baptized on 5 May at St Marylebone Parish Church. A year after his marriage his first daughter, Julia, was born. In 1836 a son, William Robert, was born. His third child, James Edwin, who was the object of the description of the syndrome that bears his name, was born on 13 February 1840.

West was working quite successfully as a general practitioner and surgeon in Tonbridge. In 1837 West published in The Lancet a description of the first ovariectomy, describing how he removed an ovarian cyst with a size of about 20 pints (11.3 liters). The patient recovered well, and the cyst was placed on display at the Museum of Guy's Hospital. His colleague and friend, John Gorham published later about several of the ovariotomies performed by West.

In late January 1841 William wrote to The Lancet describing the case of his son James, who began to suffer a seizure disorder at four months of age. West's letter was published by The Lancet on 13 February 1841, James' first birthday.

William James West died in 1848 at approximately 55 years of age, as recorded in the annals of Tonbridge, because of dropsy, an older term used to designate the ascites resulting from kidney or heart failure. His grave in which his father-in-law and a brother-in-law had already been buried before can still be visited in the cemetery of the St. Peter and St. Paul's Church in Tonbridge.

One month before the death of his father James Edwin was admitted as privileged private patient at the newly opened Park House Asylum, Middlesex, and in 1855 he moved to the Earlwood Asylum for the Feeble-Minded in Redhill. Here he died on 27 September 1860 from tuberculosis (consumption), at the age of 20 and was buried in the same grave as his father. His last attending physician was John Langdon Down who sat at his deathbed.

== Legacy ==
The name of William West is best known for the eponymous syndrome, even though the convention on the use of this name is relatively recent and dates back to 1960, when H. Gastaut organized the 9th Colloque de Marseille (Marseille Colloquium); which focused on infantile spasms. The methods of this meeting were published in the book L'encéphalopathie Myoclonique Infantile avec Hypsarythmie (infantile myoclonic encephalopathy with hypsarrhythmia) and was at that conference that H. Gastaut suggested the use of West syndrome as an eponym for infantile spasms; which is widely used for the syndrome to date.

C'est pourquoi, dans la suite l'ouvrage et sans prejuger de l'avenir, parlerons-nous de 'Encéphalopathie myoclonique infantile avec Hypsarythmie' pour l'affection en cause. Pour en désigner le sigle, nous utiliserons: EMIH, excepté lorsque nous nous référerons à l'aspect historique du problème, où nous parlerons alors de syndrome de West.

And it is why, in the remainder of this work, without making judgments about future developments in progress, we should use the term Infantile Myoclonic Encephalopathy with Hypsarrhythmia to designate this illness, except when referring to the historical aspects of this problem, we should then discuss about West Syndrome.

The truth is that most of the legacy of William and James West would have been lost forever if Mary West had not donated, some six months after the death of her husband, her private journal to William Newnham, a physician from Farnham. Newnham had found a similar case described by West two years before the publication of the case of James in The Lancet, so Mary's journal apparently aroused great interest in Newnham. A couple of years later Newnham wrote a monograph describing four cases, one of which was that of James West; Newnham's monograph quoted directly from Mary West's journal, and it is thanks to this work and the William West's letter to The Lancet, that some scant information has been retained about the private life and history of William and James West.

== Bibliography ==
- Case of compound fracture of the cranium, Accompanied with Hernia Cerebri, and extensive Sloughing of the Brain. – Recovery. In: The Lancet, volume 15, issue 386 (1831, January 22) p. 571.
- Successful operation for the removal of an ovarian tumour. In: The Lancet, volume 29, no. 743 (1837, November 25) p. 307-308.
- On a peculiar form of infantile convulsions. In: The Lancet, volume 35, no. 911 (1841, February 13) p. 724-725.

== See also ==
- West syndrome
