= Wadenhoe =

Village in Northamptonshire, England

Coordinates: 52.4395°N 0.5148°W

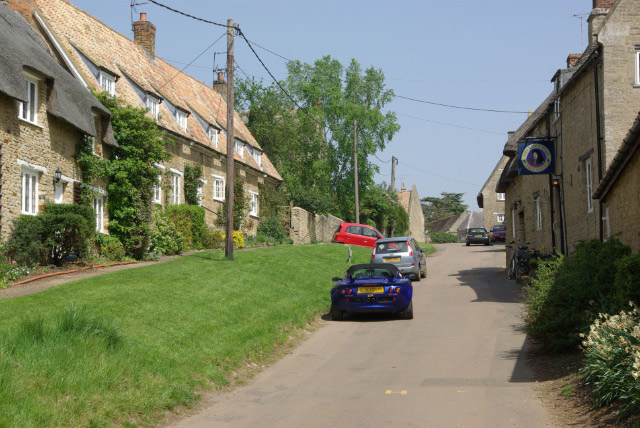
- Church Street, Wadenhoe

- Location within Northamptonshire
- Population: 244 (2011)
- OS grid reference: TL0183
- Civil parish: Pilton, Stoke Doyle and Wadenhoe
- Unitary authority: North Northamptonshire
- Ceremonial county: Northamptonshire
- Region: East Midlands
- Country: England
- Sovereign state: United Kingdom
- Post town: Peterborough
- Postcode district: PE8
- Dialling code: 01832
- Police: Northamptonshire
- Fire: Northamptonshire
- Ambulance: East Midlands
- UK Parliament: Corby and East Northamptonshire

Wadenhoe is a village and civil parish in North Northamptonshire. The population (including Pilton and Stoke Doyle) of the civil parish at the 2011 Census was 244. It is on the River Nene, approximately 4 miles from Thrapston and 10 miles from Corby. The Nene Way long-distance footpath passes through the village.

== History ==
The village's name means 'hill-spur of Wada'.

There is evidence of prehistoric occupation by way of earthworks. The original Domesday village was located north east of the church; the area surrounding the church is now a Site of Special Scientific Interest. There is extensive evidence of Roman occupation and encampment within the village, with finds of coins and pottery recorded. The ancient sites are not protected.

The manor and lands have changed ownership many times over the centuries, the position of the current village is near to its position in the Saxon period.

=== Manor ===
The manor of Wadenhoe was held by a half a knight's fee or through the Honour of Winchester, whilst other holdings were direct from the King. At the time of the Norman Conquest of 1066 Wadenhoe became part of Rockingham Forest. The village was named 'Wadenho' in the Domesday Book in 1086, and was within an area named the Hundred of Navisford, one of eight Hundreds held by the Abbey of Peterborough granted by Richard I consisting of Titchmarsh, Catworth, Clopton, Achurch, Thrapston Pilton and Stoke Doyle. The Tenant in Chief was Bishop Geoffrey of Coutances and the Lord at that time Aubrey De Vere, the population was recorded as 31 households. The manor remained property and in full possession of the de Vere family until 1229.

By 1236 the manor was subinfeudated to John de Lacy, Earl of Lincoln. He was succeeded in 1241 by his son Edmund, who obtained livery of his father's lands by 1249 and in 1254 granted the manor to Henry de Lacy, 3rd Earl of Lincoln, for life. On Roger's death in 1264, it reverted to the Lacy's and was held in dower by Edmund's widow Alice.

The son and heir of Alice Lacy was Henry, 3rd Earl of Lincoln after his death in 1311, by 1312, the manor passed to his daughter and heir Alice de Lacy, Countess of Lincoln, then wife of Thomas, 2nd Earl of Lancaster. After Lancaster's execution in 1321, Alice Lacy married Sir Ebulo Lestrange and they obtained a grant of the manors for life from Edward II, with remainder to Hugh le Despencer, the younger. A 1249 grant of free warren obtained by Edmund de Lacy was claimed in 1330 by Baron Strange and Alice Lacy, they obtained a grant from Edward III of the manor for themselves and their heirs. On the death of both Ebulo and Alice, the manor should have passed to Ebulo's nephew Roger Lestrange of Knokyn, on whom it had been settled in 1336, but in 1337 he had granted the reversion to Nicholas de Cantilupe for life, he died in 1356.

After 1356 the manor again passed the heir of the Lestrange estates. His descendants held it till the death of John Lestrange in 1477 the manor next passed to a daughter and heiress Joan, the wife of George Stanley, the manor was then sold.

By 1532 the manor was property of William Blount, 4th Baron Mountjoy. His son and successor Charles Blount, 5th Baron Mountjoy, sold it to Henry VIII in 1543, and in 1550 Edward VI granted it to Princess Elizabeth, who later became Queen Elizabeth I.

In 1551, however, an exchange was made with Sir Walter Mildmay and in 1617 the manor passed by exchange to the Earls of Westmoreland. By 1668, Charles, Earl of Westmoreland, sold it to John Stanyan, who sold it sixteen years later to Brooke Bridges on his death in 1702 the manor then passed to his great-nephew John Bridges, the historian, who in turn sold the manor in 1714 to Sir Edward Ward, Chief Baron of the Exchequer. The descendant Edward Hunt of Oundle, a merchant, had a son Thomas, who inherited to the manor of Wadenhoe, he left no surviving issue. The manor passed to his brother Rowland, who married Frances Welch, and from him to his son Thomas Welch Hunt. Thomas Welch Hunt left Wadenhoe to his aunt, Mary Hunt (d. unm. 1835), with remainder to his cousin, Mary Caroline Hunt (d. unm. 1847), daughter of Rev. Edward Hunt, younger son of Thomas Hunt of Boreatton, and with ultimate remainder to Rev. George Hunt (d. 1853), son of Rowland, son of the last-named Thomas.

George Hunt was succeeded by his son the Right Hon. George Ward Hunt, Chancellor of the Exchequer and First Lord of the Admiralty. His son George Eden Hunt succeeded him in 1877 and died in 1892 leaving a son George Ward Hunt, captain in the Northamptonshire regiment, who was killed in action in 1915. His son George Edgar Ward Hunt, born 1911 became owner.

A water-mill and free fishery are mentioned in 1356 and two mills are referred to in 1656 and again in 1818.

== Governance ==
The Parish council is Pilton, Stoke Doyle & Wadenhoe. There are three Oundle district councillors who represent the village on East Northamptonshire District Council. The village is represented through the Oundle county councillor on Northamptonshire County Council. The parliamentary constituency is Corby.

== Listed buildings and structures ==
There are a number of listed buildings and structures within the village, all of which are grade II status, these include;

- 1 to 12, Wadenhoe Lane,
- 16, Main Street,
- 21 to 24, Pilton Road,
- 27, 31 to 34 Church Street, and Caroline Cottage,
- Barn Approximately 30 Metres West of Manor Farmhouse
- Barn Approximately 50 Metres South West of Home Farmhouse
- Church of St Michael and All Angels
- Dovecote Approximately 15 Metres West of Dovecote House, Pilton Road,
- Dovecote House, Pilton Road,
- Garden Lodge and Attached Stables Approximately 30 Metres North West of Wadenhoe House
- Group of 3 Chest Tombs and 3 Headstones Approximately 3 Metres North of North Porch of Church
- Group of 3 Chest Tombs and One Coffin Slab, Approximately 12 Metres North of North Aisle of Church
- Home Farmhouse
- K6 Telephone Kiosk (telephone Number Clopton 221) Main Street,
- Kitchen Garden Walls Approximately 20 Metres West of Wadenhoe House and Attached Outbuilding to East
- Manor Farm House and Attached Outbuilding
- Mill Farm Cottage
- South Lodge
- Stables Attached to South of Home Farmhouse
- The Cottage, Mill Lane,
- The Kings Head Public House and Attached Outbuilding
- The Mill, Mill Lane,
- The Old Rectory, Glebe Court
- Wadenhoe House, Pilton Road,
- Wadenhoe Post Office

== Demography ==
At the time of the 2001 census, Wadenhoe civil parish had 124 inhabitants.

== Religion ==
=== Church of St. Michael and All Angels ===
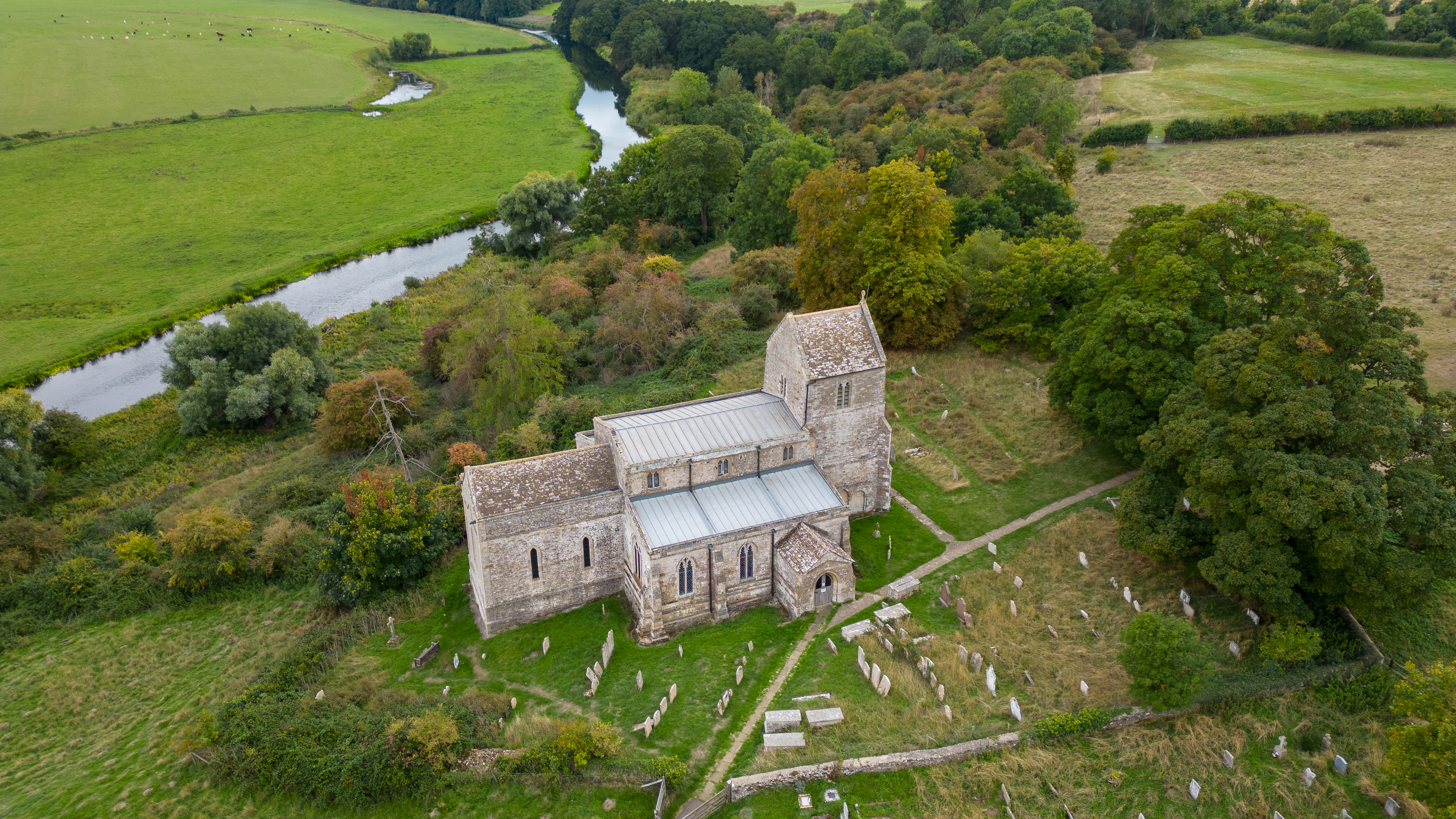
Wadenhoe Church

The church of St. Michael and All Angels is within the Oundle Deanery, in the Peterborough diocese. The church consists of chancel 27 ft. by 16 ft. with a modern vestry on the south side, clearstoried nave 36 ft. 6 in. by 19 ft., north and south aisles each 12 ft. 6 in. wide, north porch, and west tower with saddleback roof 15 ft. by 14 ft. 6 in., all these measurements being internal.

The tower is all that is left of a late 12th-century church (c. 1195–1200), the chancel and nave of which were rebuilt some time in the next century. The nave arcades are of this period, that on the north being the earlier, but the aisles appear to have been rebuilt and widened in the 14th century. In 1901 there was an extensive restoration of the fabric when the floors of the nave and aisles were lowered to their original level and the tower was underpinned to a solid foundation. The roofs are all modern, those of the nave and aisles being leaded and the chancel roof tiled. The parapets throughout are plain.

The ground falls rapidly from west to east and the chancel stands high above the level of the churchyard: on the north side there are two steps down to the porch and five from the porch to the floor of the church. The chancel has an east window of two lights with a circle in the head, originally c. 1250, and there are single lancets in the north and south walls. The vestry is of brick and is five steps below the chancel level. The 13th-century arch to the nave is of two chamfered orders, the inner one resting on moulded corbels supported by grotesque heads.

The windows of the north aisle are all of 14th-century date, that at the east end being of three trefoiled lights with modern reticulated tracery, the others of two lights with quatrefoil in the head. On each side of the east window is a moulded corbel for a statue. In the south aisle the east window is of three tall trefoiled lights, with slight piercings, c. 1280, and near it, in the usual position, is a pointed piscina with fluted bowl and inner trefoil arch on plain corbels. The other windows are later and of two cinquefoiled lights. Both doorways have continuous moulded head and jambs, and there is a pseudo-Gothic plaster ribbed ceiling to the porch. At the west end of the south aisle is a stone wallbench. The clearstory windows are square-headed and of two trefoiled lights.

There are 17th-century tombs and headstones in the churchyard, and on one of the buttresses on the south side are three scratch dials.

The registers before 1812 are as follows: (i) all entries 1559–1648, and births 1654–81; (ii) baptisms 1695–1812, marriages 1695–1754, burials 1683–1812; (iii) marriages 1754–1812. The second volume contains entries of penances between 1719 and 1763.

The Church was used as the backdrop for the opening scenes of the 1999 version of A Christmas Carol starring Patrick Stewart.

=== Wadenhoe Church Interior ===
The church contains a 13th-century font, being a circular bowl moulded round the lower edge and ornamented at the top with lunettes of foliage, below each joint of which are rosettes, dogtooth and masks in relief set vertically on the face of the cylinder. The font has been reset on an octagonal stone step.

The early 18th-century oak pulpit was re-arranged during the restoration. The seating is modern, but in the aisles are some carved and traceried bench ends, perhaps of 16th-century date. There is a brass plate in the floor of the nave to John Andrewe (d. 1629), and in the chancel a mural monument to Brooke Bridges (d. 1702).

There are six bells in the tower, the first cast by Tobie Norris, of Stamford, in 1603; the second a mediæval bell inscribed 'Ave Maria gratia plena Dominus tecum'; the tenor dated 1607. The tenor alone is rung, the others being cracked.

The plate consists of a silver cup and cover paten of 1755, a flagon of 1776, and a silver dish with the mark of Jacques Cottin, of Paris, c. 1726, inscribed 'To the Pious Memory of ye Revd. Mr. Nat. Bridges who was 33 years Rectr. of this Church 1747.'

== Gallery ==
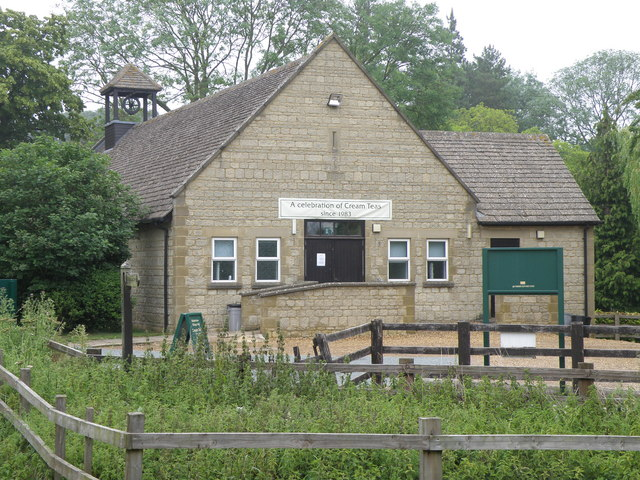
Wadenhoe Village Hall

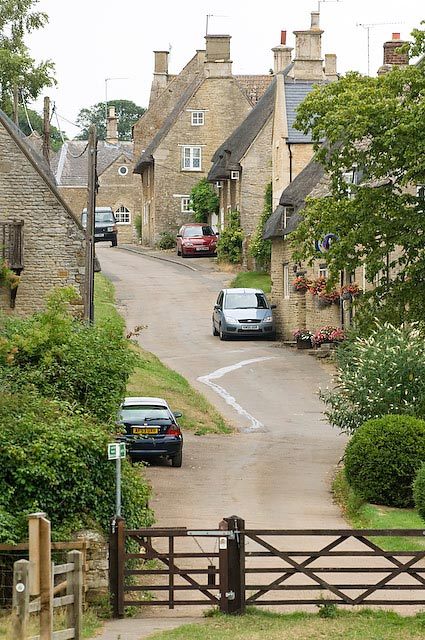
Church Street, Wadenhoe

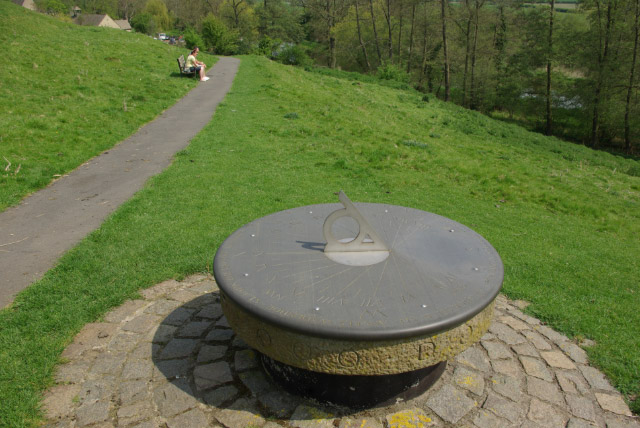
Sundial at Wadenhoe

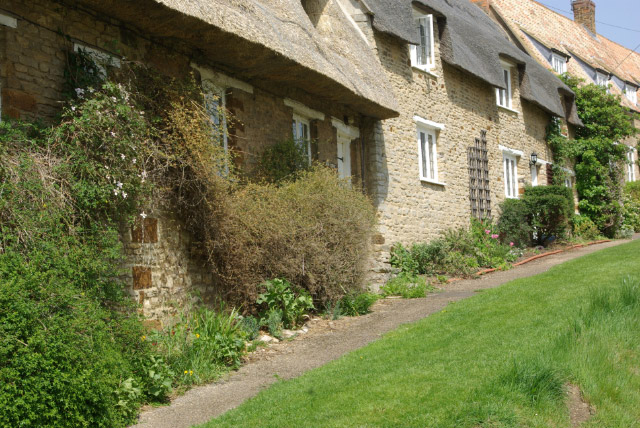
Cottages at Wadenhoe

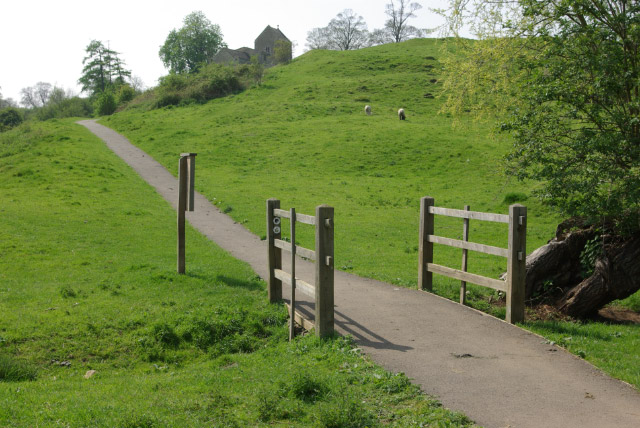
Path to Wadenhoe Church

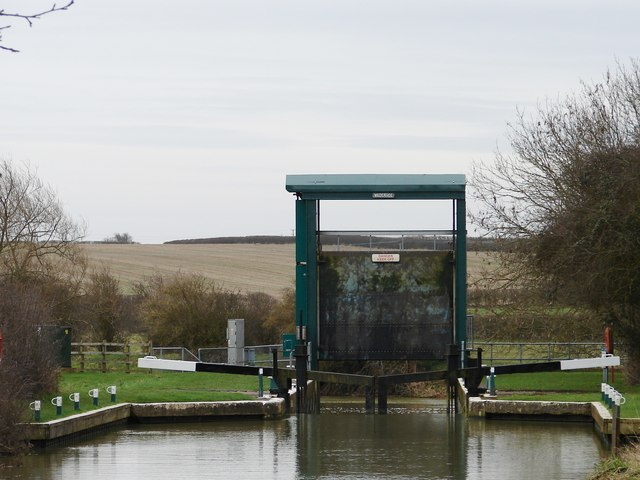
Wadenhoe Lock and sluice gate

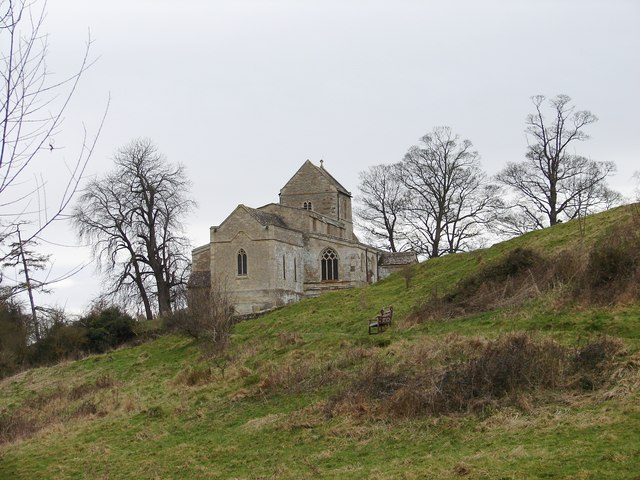
Wadenhoe Church from the car park

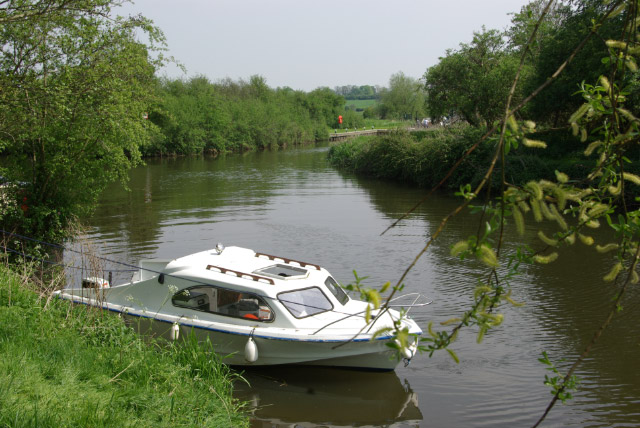
River Nene, Wadenhoe - geograph.org.uk

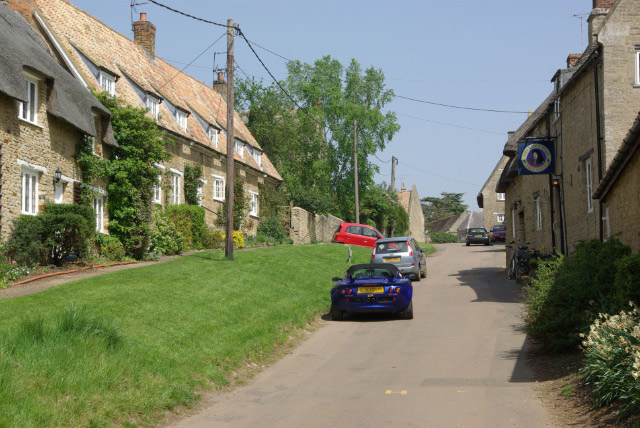
Church Street, Wadenhoe - geograph.org.uk

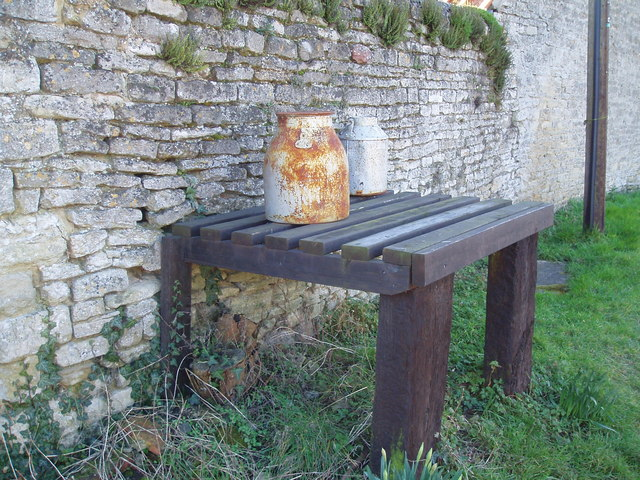
Milk Churn Stand, Wadenhoe - geograph.org.uk

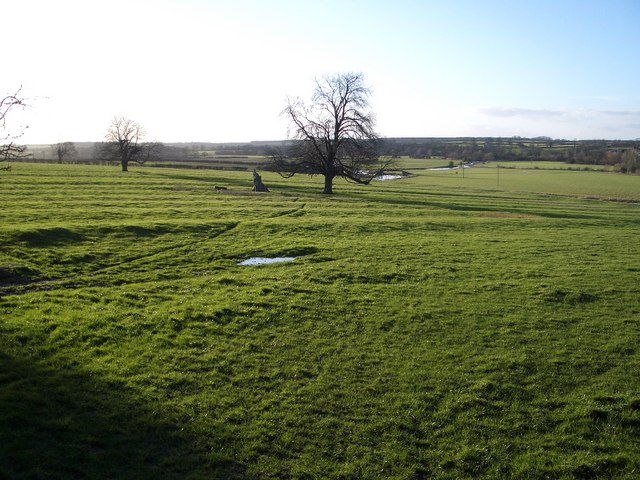
Footpath from Achurch to Wadenhoe

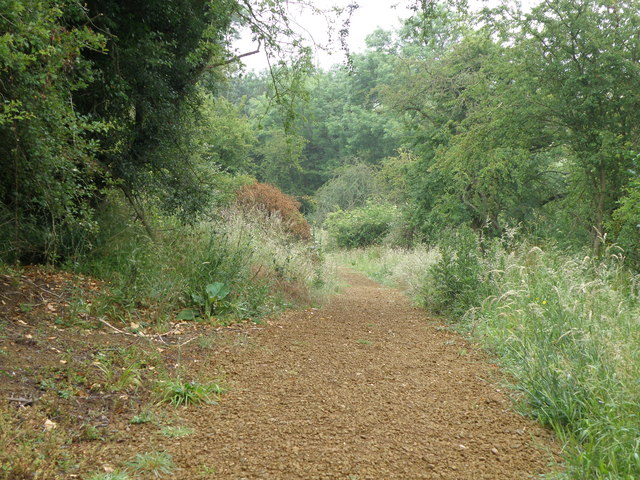
The Nene Way near Wadenhoe

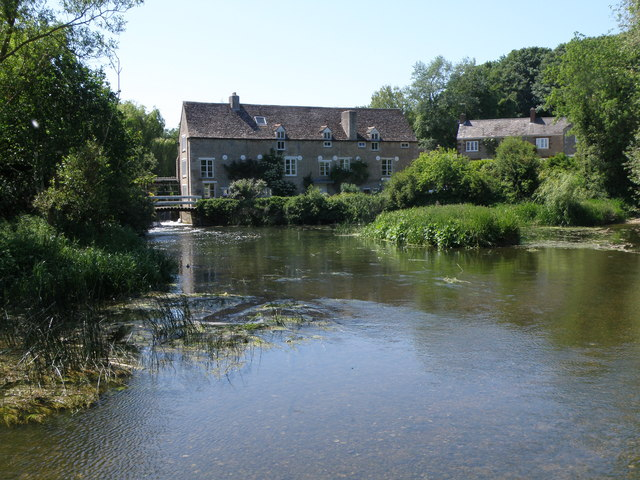
Mill pond and Mill Wadenhoe

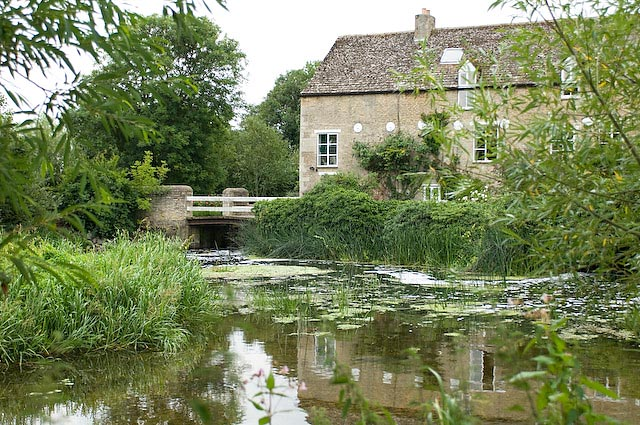
Wadenhoe Mill on the River Nene

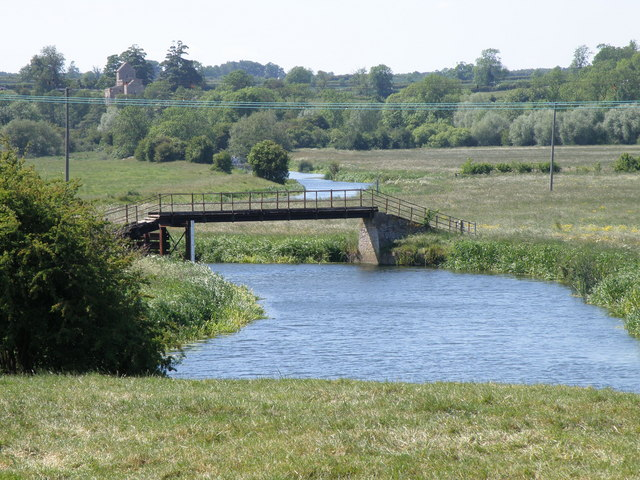
Footpath bridge between Achurch and Wadenhoe

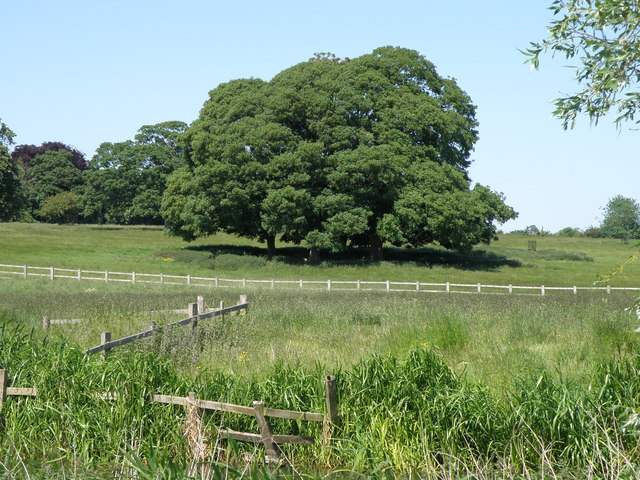
Trees in a parkland setting, Wadenhoe

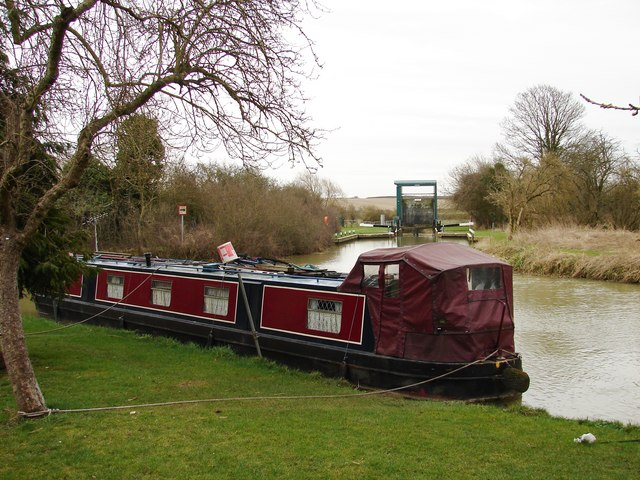
Mooring on the River Nene at Wadenhoe

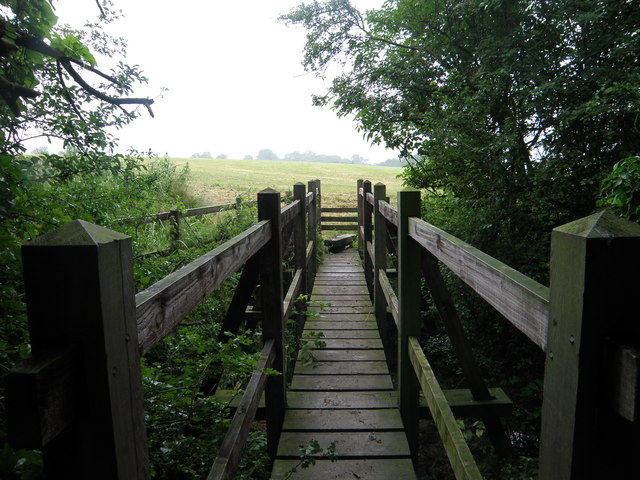
Footbridge on the Nene Way between Aldwincle and Wadenhoe

== Music ==
Composer and poet Trevor Hold, born in Northampton, lived at Dovecote House in Wadenhoe from 1969 until his death in January 2004. He composed The Wadenhoe Preludes for organ in 1969, The Wadenhoe Clavichord Book in 1987, and The Dovecote Suite for bassoon and piano in 1990, five movements evoking the family home.

== Notable people ==
William James West after whom the West syndrome is named was baptized in Wadenhoe in 1793, July 9.
