= Newnam =

Newnam is a surname occurring from medieval times in Britain. The surname has many variations, such as "Newenham" and "Newnham".

People bearing it include:

- Thomas Newnam (died 1775), British explorer of Pen Park Hole
- Pat Newnam (1880–1938), American baseball player
- Frank Newnam, Jr. (fl. 1946–69), American third partner in Lockwood, Andrews & Newnam civil-engineering partnership & president of ASCE
- Boyd Newnam (fl. 1967–1971), American running trainer of Earl Owens
- Brendan Francis Newnam (born c. 1976), American radio host
- Scott Newnam (fl. since 2000), American audio marketer
- Sarah Newnam (fl. 2009), Dartmouth ice hockey co-Captain, 2008–09
- Charles Newnam (born 1987), Naval Aviator
- Ben Newnam (born 1991), American soccer player

== See also ==
- Newnham (surname)
- Newnan, Georgia
- Newnham Paddox
