= Jackknife =

Jackknife may refer to:

- Pocketknife or jackknife, a compact, foldable knife
- Jackknife Bar, Portland, Oregon, U.S.
- Jackknifing, a type of crash with articulated vehicle combinations

== Film and television ==
- Jacknife, a 1989 American film by David Jones
- "Jack Knife", an episode of NCIS
- Jackknife, a character on Superjail!

== Athletics and sports ==
- Jackknife (exercise), an abdominal exercise
- Jackknife, a kicking move involving 540-degree rotation
- Jackknife, a type of high dive
- Jackknife hold, a pinning move in professional wrestling

== Other uses ==
- Jackknife (statistics), a resampling technique in statistics
- Jackknife clam, common name for several species of bivalve mollusc

== See also ==
- Jackknife Bascule Bridge, a bridge in Thunder Bay, Ontario, Canada
- The Jack-Knife Man, a 1920 film
