= Erich Leinsdorf =

American conductor (1912–1993)

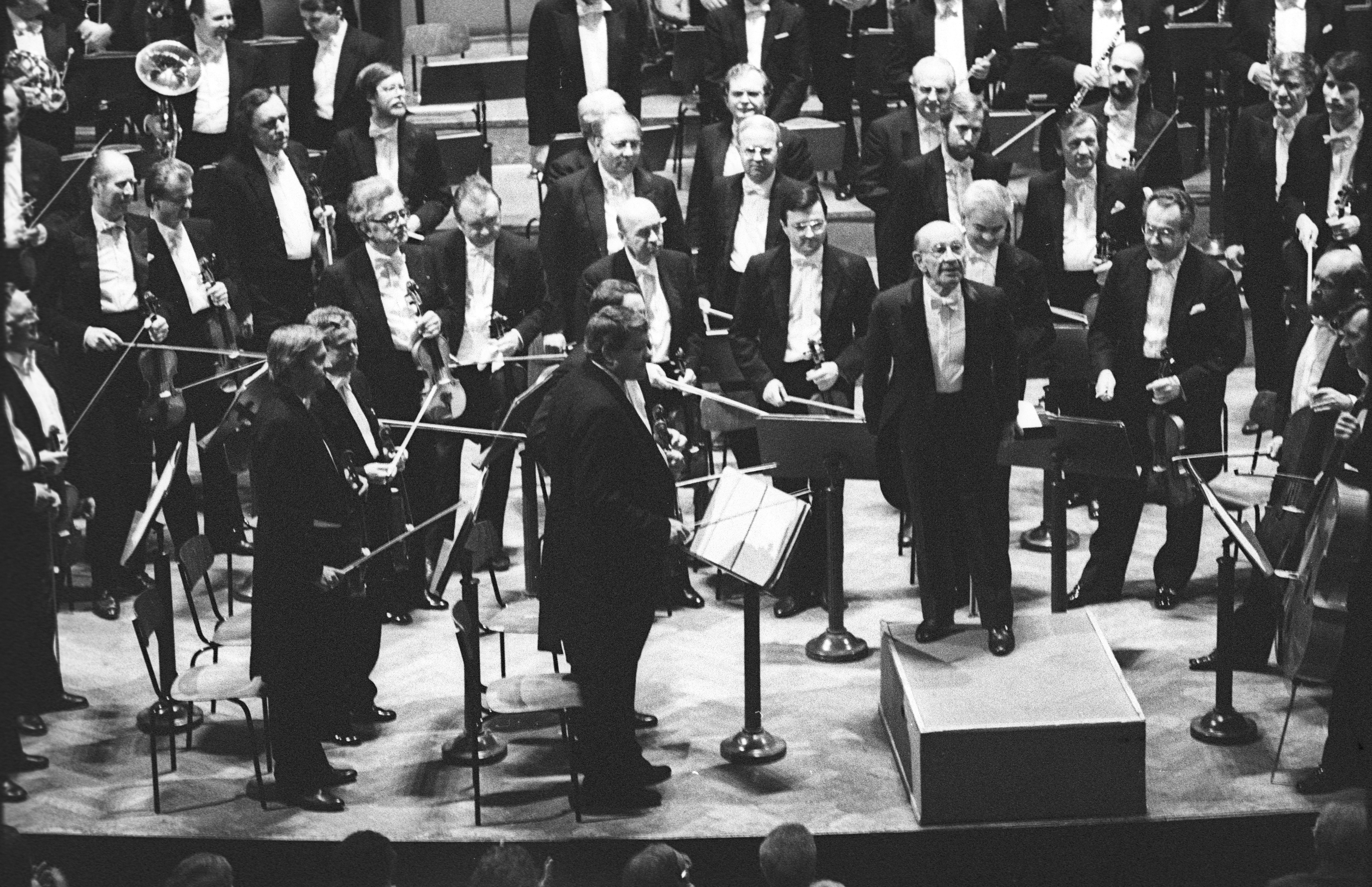
Leinsdorf conducting the Czech Philharmonic, 1988

Erich Leinsdorf (born Erich Landauer; February 4, 1912 – September 11, 1993) was an Austrian-born American conductor. He performed and recorded with leading orchestras and opera companies throughout the United States and Europe, earning a reputation for exacting standards as well as an acerbic personality. He also published books and essays on musical matters.

== Biography ==
Leinsdorf was born to a Jewish family in Vienna, and was studying music at a local school by the age of 5. He played the cello and studied composition. In his teens, Leinsdorf worked as a piano accompanist for singers. He studied conducting at the Mozarteum in Salzburg, and later at the University of Vienna and the Vienna Academy of Music. From 1934 to 1937 he worked as an assistant to the noted conductors Bruno Walter and Arturo Toscanini at the Salzburg Festival.

In November 1937, Leinsdorf travelled to the United States to take up a position as assistant conductor at the Metropolitan Opera in New York City. As it turned out, his departure from Austria came a few short months ahead of the Anschluss of March 1938, when the country was taken over by Nazi Germany. With the assistance of freshman Representative from Texas Lyndon B. Johnson, he was able to stay in the United States, and became a naturalized American citizen in 1942.

While at the Met, Leinsdorf was particularly noted for his Wagner performances; after the sudden death of Artur Bodanzky in 1939, he was named the Met's "head of German repertoire". By the spring of 1943, the candidates being considered to take over for Artur Rodzinski as music director of The Cleveland Orchestra included Vladimir Golschmann of the St. Louis Symphony Orchestra, Albert Stoessel of the Juilliard School and New York Oratorio Society, George Szell and Leinsdorf, both from the Met.

External audio
- Erich Leinsdorf conducting Symphony No. 6 in D major, Op. 60 by Antonin Dvorak with the Cleveland Orchestra in 1946; At archive.org

Given Leinsdorf's age (31) and limited experience conducting performances outside of opera, questions arose about his capacity for the job. However, Leinsdorf won a vote taken by the orchestra's board of directors and became the ensemble's third music director, in 1943. Among the most significant developments during Leinsdorf's first year in Cleveland was his intention to schedule the entire season in advance so the orchestra could promote its concerts ahead of time and reach a wider audience; his desire to have the orchestra play a year-round schedule — though World War II complicated that possibility; and, finally, the successful negotiation of a weekly radio broadcast on Sunday evenings—allowing The Cleveland Orchestra to be heard throughout the United States, parts of Mexico, and by short wave across Europe, South America, and the South Pacific. More importantly, perhaps, given U.S. involvement in the war, concerts would be recorded and broadcast to overseas American military zones.

In the event, Leinsdorf's tenure as music director was short-lived. In October 1943, he received a letter informing him that his potential draft status had changed—though he remained doubtful he would be called to serve because of a host of health problems. Later in the month, however, he received his draft notice, remarking to the press: "I intend to abide by the orders of my government." Leinsdorf's impending departure left the Musical Arts Association with a major problem: The Cleveland Orchestra needed a new music director.

Although Leinsdorf's service in the Army was only less than a year—he was honorably discharged in September 1944—the orchestra already had its sights set on his replacement. In November 1944, George Szell, who had been at the Met with Leinsdorf, made his Severance Hall debut to rave reviews. Leinsdorf was still under contract, but he had lost much of his power as music director—compromising on a number of issues, from performance content to recording authority. He returned to the podium at Severance Hall for the last program of the season. As public opinion shifted toward Szell, Leinsdorf submitted his resignation. But after Szell's death, in 1970, Leinsdorf returned regularly to lead The Cleveland Orchestra as a guest conductor through the 1980s.

External audio
- Erich Leinsdorf conducting the Rochester Philharmonic Orchestra in Wolfgang Amadeus Mozart's; Symphony No. 41 in C major (K. 551) "Jupiter"; Symphony No. 35 in D major (K. 385) "Haffner" in 1957; At archive.org

Leinsdorf was the principal conductor of the Rochester Philharmonic Orchestra from 1947 to 1955. He came to despair of what he saw as Rochester's insular musical culture, famously remarking that "Rochester is the best disguised dead end in the world!" Subsequently, he was briefly head of the New York City Opera, before resuming his association with the Met. In 1962 he was named music director of the Boston Symphony Orchestra. His tenure in Boston produced many recordings for RCA Victor, but was also marked by controversy, as he often clashed with musicians and administrators.

On November 22, 1963, during an afternoon concert with the Boston Symphony, Leinsdorf had to announce the report of President John F. Kennedy's assassination in Dallas, Texas, to a shocked audience. He and the orchestra followed the news with a performance of the Funeral March from Beethoven's Eroica Symphony. Leinsdorf left the Boston Symphony in 1969. He continued to guest-conduct operas and orchestras around the world for the next two decades, being particularly associated with the Metropolitan Opera and the New York Philharmonic. He also served from 1978 to 1980 as principal conductor of the (West) Berlin Radio Symphony Orchestra. He died of cancer in Zürich, Switzerland, at the age of 81.

Leinsdorf is also known for his arrangements of orchestral concert suites of music from major operas. They include: Claude Debussy's Pelléas et Mélisande, Richard Wagner's Parsifal, and Richard Strauss's Die Frau ohne Schatten.

== Recordings ==
External audio
- Erich Leinsdorf conducting Symphony No. 1 in B-flat major, Op. 38 ("Spring") by Robert Schumann with the Cleveland Orchestra in 1946; At archive.org
- Erich Leinsdorf with the Rochester Philharmonic in Franz Schubert's Rosamunde Overture and Ballet Music, Op.26; Felix Mendelssohn's Symphony No. 4 in A Major, Op. 90 ("Italian"); At archive.org

Leinsdorf recorded throughout his career, including some 78-rpm discs for RCA Victor and for Columbia Records with the Cleveland Orchestra. In the early 1950s, Leinsdorf recorded all of the Mozart symphonies for Westminster with the Royal Philharmonic Orchestra, and started a highly regarded series of recordings with the Rochester Philharmonic for Columbia featuring a Beethoven Eroica that rivaled that of Toscanini in intensity. Leinsdorf made a number of stereo recordings with the Los Angeles Philharmonic, the Philharmonia Orchestra, and a Los Angeles pick-up orchestra called The Concert Arts Orchestra for Capitol Records in the 1960s. He also recorded the Brahms First Symphony, the Franck Symphony in D Minor, and the Mendelssohn First and Grieg piano concertos for RCA Victor with Ania Dorfmann and the Philadelphia Orchestra, listed as the Robin Hood Dell Orchestra on disc. Beginning in 1957, Leinsdorf conducted a series of acclaimed complete stereophonic opera recordings for RCA Victor in Rome, commencing with Puccini's Tosca with Zinka Milanov, Jussi Björling, and Leonard Warren. He continued to record prodigiously for RCA Victor as music director of the Boston Symphony Orchestra, with notable releases of Mahler, Bartok, the complete Beethoven and Brahms symphonies, and a live Mozart Requiem in memory of President John F. Kennedy. Later, he again made additional operatic recordings, including the first complete stereo recording of Erich Wolfgang Korngold's Die Tote Stadt, with Carol Neblett and René Kollo for RCA. Leinsdorf conducted the Boston Symphony with pianist Artur Rubinstein in the pianist's second complete recordings of Beethoven's piano concertos, Brahms' First Piano Concerto, and Tchaikovsky's First Piano Concerto. He also recorded a complete Lohengrin with the Boston Symphony for RCA Victor, a massive and expensive project, which at the time was the first Wagner opera recorded with a major US orchestra. It was announced at the beginning of Leinsdorf's appointment with the Boston Symphony that he and the orchestra would record all the major works of Prokofieff, but by the end of his tenure in Boston only symphonies 2, 3, 5, and 6, the violin concertos, the five piano concertos, music from Romeo and Juliet, the Scythian Suite and the Symphony-Concerto for Cello had been recorded and issued. Many critics considered several of his recordings flawed by RCA Victor's controversial Dynagroove mastering process. For Decca/London Leinsdorf recorded many Mozart operas, including Don Giovanni, Cosi fan tutte, and the Marriage of Figaro as well as a highly regarded recording of Wagner's Die Walküre. After leaving Boston in the 1970s, Leinsdorf returned to Decca/London to record several releases in their acclaimed Phase 4 Stereo project, notably Stravinsky's Rite of Spring and Petrouchka. For Sheffield Labs, Leinsdorf recorded three direct-to-disc recordings with the Los Angeles Philharmonic in the 1980s.

Leinsdorf received seven Grammy Awards during his career:

- 1961 – Best Opera Recording (for Turandot)
- 1964 – Best Opera Recording (for Madama butterfly)
- 1964 – Best Orchestral Performance (for Bartók: Concerto for Orchestra)
- 1965 – Best Orchestral Performance (for Mahler: Symphony No. 5 / Berg: Excerpts from Wozzeck)
- 1967 – Best Orchestral Performance (for Mahler: Symphony No. 6)
- 1969 – Best Opera Recording (for Così fan tutte)
- 1972 – Best Opera Recording (for Aida)

He also received a total of 12 Grammy nominations during his lifetime.

=== DVD ===
On video Leinsdorf conducts the Vienna Symphony in Johann Strauß: Famous Works. Available on Silverline Classics in Dolby Digital, 2003. A number of Leinsdorf's televised performances with The Boston Symphony Orchestra have been released on DVD by VAI and ICA Classics; most notably on ICA Classics, a performance of Tchaikovsky's 5th Symphony taped in color from April 1969. This has received several critical accolades.

== Television ==
Leinsdorf with the BSO appeared regularly on local broadcasts from WGBH-TV and nationally on PBS in the Evening at symphony broadcasts. On August 17, 1967, Leinsdorf conducted the Boston Symphony Orchestra in a two-hour primetime special telecast in color on NBC, a reflection of the days when a commercial network would periodically broadcast a full-length classical concert. The program, entitled An Evening at Tanglewood, featured violinist Itzhak Perlman as guest soloist.

== Quotes ==
Three works that make conducting worthwhile are Wagner's Siegfried, the [Beethoven] Ninth, and Rite of Spring.

Ladies and gentlemen, we have a press report over the wires – we hope that it is unconfirmed, but we have to doubt it – that the President of the United States has been the victim of an assassination. [gasps from the audience] We will play the Funeral March from Beethoven's Third Symphony.

— Erich Leinsdorf informing the audience at a BSO performance at Symphony Hall and over WGBH radio of the assassination of President John F. Kennedy, November 22, 1963.

== Bibliography ==
- Leinsdorf, Erich (1976). Cadenza: A Musical Career. Boston: Houghton Mifflin. ISBN 0-395-24401-3.
- Leinsdorf, Erich (1981). The Composer's Advocate: A Radical Orthodoxy for Musicians. New Haven: Yale University Press. ISBN 0-300-02427-4.
- Leinsdorf, Erich (1997). Erich Leinsdorf on Music. Portland, OR: Amadeus Press. ISBN 1-57467-028-X.
- Rosenberg, Donald. The Cleveland Orchestra Story: Second to None. Cleveland, Gray & Company, 2000.
