= Multichannel News =

Technology magazine operated by Future US

- Cover of December 17–24, 2018 issue
- Categories: Trade magazine
- Founder: Fairchild Publications; Paul Maxwell
- First issue: September 15, 1980; 45 years ago
- Final issue: September 30, 2024
- Company: Future US
- Country: United States
- Based in: New York, NY
- Language: English
- Website: nexttv.com/multichannel-news
- ISSN: 0276-8593

Multichannel News was a magazine and website published by Future US covering multichannel television and communications providers, such as cable operators, satellite television firms and telephone companies, as well as emerging Internet video and communication services. It ran from 1980 to 2024.

== History and profile ==
Multichannel News was founded by Fairchild Publications and Paul Maxwell. Its first issue was published on September 15, 1980. A subsidiary publication, Multichannel News International focusing on non-American markets, was distributed between the mid-1990s and mid-2002.

The Walt Disney Company owned the magazine for a year after acquiring Fairchild parent Capital Cities/ABC, then sold it to Cahners Business Information, part of Reed Elsevier. In 2009, owner Reed Business Information sold Twice, Broadcasting & Cable and Multichannel News to NewBay Media. Future acquired NewBay Media in 2018.

In August 2024, Future announced the magazine would cease the following month, though it and Broadcasting & Cable (which will also cease publication) would survive as sub-brands on sister industry news website Next TV, which primarily focuses on the streaming industry.
