= Stoke Doyle =

Village in Northamptonshire, England

Coordinates: 52.4660°N 0.4950°W

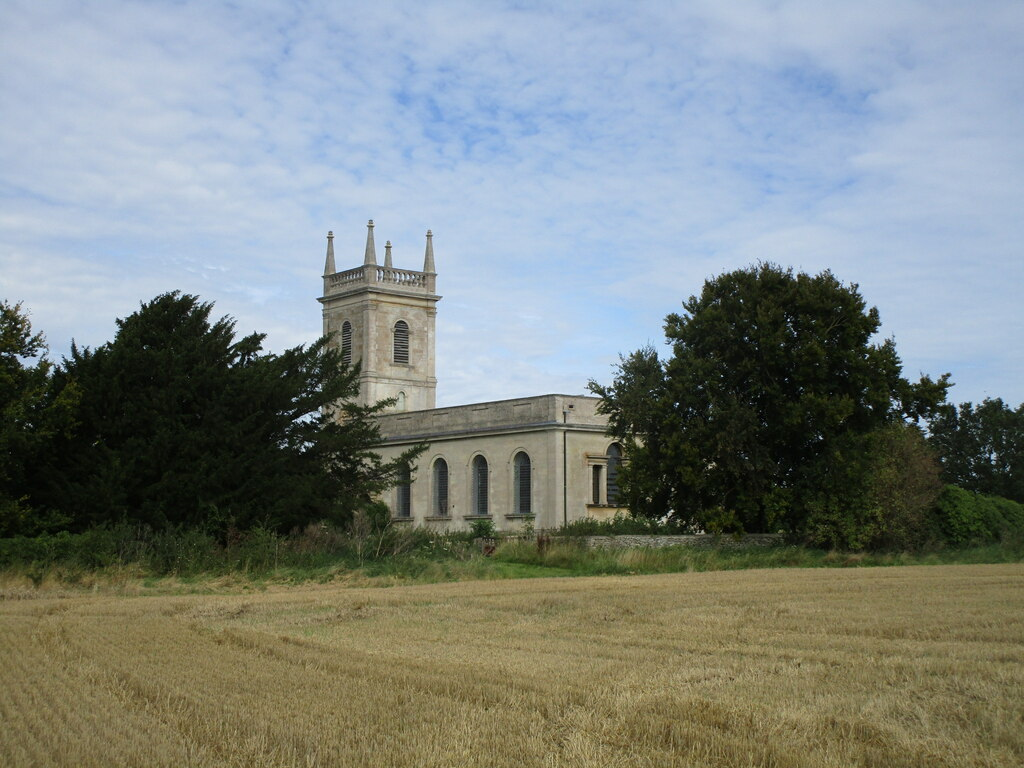
- St Rumbold's

- Location within Northamptonshire
- OS grid reference: TL0286
- Civil parish: Pilton, Stoke Doyle and Wadenhoe
- Unitary authority: North Northamptonshire
- Ceremonial county: Northamptonshire
- Region: East Midlands
- Country: England
- Sovereign state: United Kingdom
- Post town: Peterborough
- Postcode district: PE8
- Dialling code: 01832
- Police: Northamptonshire
- Fire: Northamptonshire
- Ambulance: East Midlands
- UK Parliament: Corby and East Northamptonshire

Stoke Doyle is a village and civil parish in North Northamptonshire in England, two miles south-west of Oundle. The population of the village at the 2011 Census was included in the civil parish of Wadenhoe.

The village's name means 'Outlying farm/settlement'. The village was held by John de Oyly in 1286.

== Governance ==
It is represented on the parish council of Pilton, Stoke Doyle and Wadenhoe, and on North Northamptonshire council. Before changes in 2021 it was previously represented on East Northamptonshire District Council and Northamptonshire County Council. Stoke Doyle is part of the Corby constituency, represented at the House of Commons by Tom Pursglove.

== Geography ==
Stoke Doyle is two miles south-west of the town of Oundle, on the road between there and Wadenhoe. A stream running through the village rises in Lilford Wood and flows into the River Nene.

== Demography ==
At the time of the 1991 census, the parish population was 64 people, living in a total of 29 houses.

== Landmarks ==
Stoke Doyle's church, dedicated to Saint Rumbold, stands to the east of the road and was built between 1722 and 1725. The village has a pub, the Shuckburgh Arms. A sign on the road claims the village is twinned with the Catalan city of Barcelona, but it's just a joke by one villager.
