= Newnham =

Newnham may refer to:

== Places ==
In England

- Newnham, Bedford, an area in the town of Bedford
- Newnham, Cambridgeshire
- Newnham, Gloucestershire (also known as Newnham on Severn)
- Newnham, Hampshire
- Newnham, Hertfordshire
- Newnham, Kent
- Newnham, Northamptonshire
- Newnham Murren, Oxfordshire
- Newnham, Warwickshire, in the parish of Aston Cantlow
- Newnham Paddox, Warwickshire
- Newnham Regis, Warwickshire (also known as King's Newnham)
- Newnham, Worcestershire (also known as Newnham Bridge)
- Newnham (Old), Plympton St Mary, Devon
- Newnham Park, Plympton St Mary, Devon

In Australia

- Newnham, Tasmania

Newnham as an educational establishment:

- Newnham College, Cambridge, University of Cambridge, England
- Newnham Campus, Seneca College, Ontario, Canada
- Newnham Campus, University of Tasmania, Australia

== People ==
- Newnham (surname), a list of people
