= Broadcasting & Cable =

American television industry news website

- Cover of December 3–10, 2018 issue
- Editor: Bill Gannon
- Categories: Trade magazine
- Frequency: Monthly
- Founder: Martin Codel; Sol Taishoff; Harry Shaw
- Founded: 1931
- First issue: October 15, 1931
- Final issue: September 30, 2024
- Company: Future US
- Country: United States
- Based in: New York City
- Language: English
- Website: nexttv.com/bc
- ISSN: 1068-6827

Broadcasting & Cable (B&C, or Broadcasting+Cable) was a telecommunications industry monthly trade magazine and, later, news website published by Future US. Founded in 1931 as Broadcasting, subsequent mergers, acquisitions and industry evolution saw a series of name changes, including Broadcasting and Broadcast Advertising and Broadcasting-Telecasting, returning to the original Broadcasting before adopting its current name in 1993. B&C, which was published biweekly until January 1941, and weekly thereafter, covers the business of television in the U.S.—programming, advertising, regulation, technology, finance, and news. In addition to the newsweekly, B&C operates a comprehensive website which offered a forum for industry debate and criticism.

On August 6, 2024, Future announced that the magazine would cease publication after its September 2024 issue, and switch to a digital-only format as part of sister website Next TV. However, Next TV as a whole ceased publishing new content at the end of September 2024.

== History ==
Broadcasting was founded in Washington, D.C., by Martin Codel, Sol Taishoff and former National Association of Broadcasters president Harry Shaw, and the first issue was published on October 15, 1931. Originally, Shaw was publisher, Codel editor, and Taishoff managing editor; when Shaw retired, Codel became publisher and Taishoff took over as editor-in-chief. (Taishoff had succeeded Codel writing the radio column for the Consolidated Press Association, both men using the pseudonym "Robert Mack"; the two met while covering radio in Washington.) The men operated under the corporate name Broadcasting Publications, Inc.; after Shaw's departure, the company was owned by Codel, Taishoff, and their wives. Codel left the magazine in January 1943, to work in public relations for the Red Cross in the North African theater of the war, but remained on the masthead as publisher until June 1944, at which point Taishoff and his wife bought out the Codels' interest in the magazine. Taishoff then assumed the post of the publisher in addition to editor.

Broadcasting merged with Broadcast Advertising in 1932, with the Broadcast Reporter in 1933, and with Telecast in 1953. The title was changed to Broadcasting-Telecasting beginning with the November 26, 1945, issue; Telecasting was dropped from the cover page on October 14, 1957, but remained on the masthead through January 5, 1959. The title remained Broadcasting thereafter until February 22, 1993, becoming Broadcasting & Cable with the March 1, 1993 issue.

Sol Taishoff won a Peabody Award for his reporting in 1980. Times Mirror bought Broadcasting in 1986 from the Taishoff family. Cahners Publishing bought Broadcasting in 1991. In 2009, Cahners successor Reed Business Information sold TWICE, Broadcasting & Cable and Multichannel News to NewBay Media. Future acquired NewBay Media in 2018. In 2020, Future folded Broadcasting & Cable into its new platform, Next TV.

In August 2024, Future announced the magazine would cease the following month, though it and Multichannel News (which also ceased publication) would survive as sub-brands on sister industry news website Next TV, which primarily focused on the streaming industry. However, the magazine's Hall of Fame would continue. On September 30, a notice was posted to Next TV indicating new content had ceased altogether, but that the website would remain online with archive content.

== Hall of Fame ==
The magazine sponsors an annual dinner at which about a dozen industry professionals are inducted into its Broadcasting & Cable Hall of Fame.

In December 2012, the television court show Judge Judy earned its star, Judy Sheindlin, a spot in the Broadcasting & Cable hall of fame. Sheindlin accepted the honor at the Waldorf Astoria Hotel in New York.

In 2015, the Hall of Fame celebrated its 25th anniversary and to date has honored nearly 400 executives, talent and shows, including Bob Iger, chairman and CEO of The Walt Disney Company; David Zaslav CEO and president of Warner Bros. Discovery, sports broadcaster and former NFL player Frank Gifford; Dr. Phil McGraw, host of Dr. Phil; and Kathie Lee Gifford, co-anchor of the fourth hour of Today.

As of 2019, only fifteen shows have either been inducted or are scheduled to be inducted:

- 20/20
- 60 Minutes
- American Idol
- Dateline NBC
- Entertainment Tonight
- Family Feud
- Good Morning America
- Inside the NBA
- Live with Kelly & Michael
- Mad Men
- Monday Night Football
- The Simpsons
- SportsCenter
- Today
- The View
