= Newnham (surname) =

Newnham is an English surname. It derives from several places of that name in England. Notable people with the name include:

- Arthur Newnham (1861–1941), English cricketer
- Emily Newnham (born 2004), English track and field athlete
- George Newnham (c. 1733 – 1800), English lawyer and politician
- Hartley Newnham, Australian countertenor
- Hubert Ernest Newnham (1886–1970), Ceylonese civil servant and politician
- Jervois Newnham (1852–1941), Anglican clergyman in Canada
- John Newnham (born 1942), Australian footballer
- Lance Newnham (1889–1943), British soldier
- Lewis Newnham (1881–1932), South African cricketer
- Maurice Newnham (1897–1974), British flying ace of World War I
- Nicole Newnham, American documentary film producer, writer, and director
- Obadiah Newnham (1848–1932), Anglican clergyman in Canada
- Stanley Newnham (1910–1985), English cricketer
- Tom Newnham (1926–2010), New Zealand political activist and educationalist
- William Newnham, several people

== See also ==
- Newnam (surname)
