= William Newnham =

William Newnham may refer to:

- William Newnham (engineer) (1888–1974), New Zealand civil engineer and engineering administrator
- William Newnham (physician) (1790–1865), English physician
- William Thomson Newnham (1923–2014), Canadian educator
