= Nordost Corporation =

- Industry: Consumer Electronics
- Founded: 1991
- Founders: Joe Reynolds, Vincent Garino, Jeffrey Garino
- Headquarters: Massachusetts, United States
- Products: High-end audio cables, interconnects, power distribution and accessories

Nordost Corporation is an American high-end audio company founded in 1991 by Joe Reynolds, Vincent Garino, and Jeffrey Garino and based in Holliston, Massachusetts. Nordost manufactures and sells audio and video cables, interconnects and audio accessories. Its products are distributed in 72 countries.

== Overview ==
Nordost was founded in Massachusetts in 1991. Nordost manufactures audio cables, power distribution systems, grounding systems and resonance control devices. All Nordost cables use a flexible FEP insulation originally developed by DuPont. Nordost products are manufactured in the USA.

Nordost produces a range of cable products. In addition to power cables and interconnect cable, digital cable and loudspeaker, the company also manufactures the QRT line of products, power purifiers and grounding systems and a line of Sort System vibration controlling devices. In 2014, Nordost introduced the first American-made HDMI cable.
