= PEHO syndrome =

- Other names: Progressive encephalopathy with edema, hypsarrhythmia and optic atrophy
- Usual onset: Infancy, Neonatal
- Diagnostic method: Mainly clinical, MRI
- Differential diagnosis: Aicardi syndrome, mevalonic aciduria, CDG syndromes, autosomal recessive cerebellar hypoplasia, Joubert syndrome, olivo-pontine cerebellar atrophies
- Treatment: Supportive care
- Prognosis: Very poor; most die before age 15

PEHO syndrome (progressive encephalopathy with edema, hypsarrhythmia and optic atrophy) is an autosomal recessive and dominant, progressive neurodegenerative disorder that starts in the first few weeks or months of life. Early symptoms include infantile spasms, hyparrhythmia, and seizures, and optic atrophy. Other features include arrest of global developmental delay, severe intellectual deficit, encephalopathy, tapered fingers, and facial dysmorphism.

There is no specific treatment for PEHO syndrome; only the symptoms associated with the syndrome can be managed. PEHO syndrome affects the Finnish population with an estimate of 1 in 78,000; cases have been described in non-Finnish persons and from other countries.

== Cause ==
The cause of the Finnish-type PEHO syndrome is homozygous pathogenic variants in the ZNHIT3 gene. Variants affecting the motor domain of KIF1A has also been suggested to cause full or partial phenotype of PEHO in others. There has been other pathogenic variants in other genes known to be associated with the syndrome.

== Treatment ==
There is no cure for PEHO syndrome. Some symptoms can be managed, but otherwise treatment is supportive care.
