= Twice (magazine) =

American trade publication

- Type: Trade magazine
- Format: Paper and online magazine
- Owner: Future US
- Editor: Unknown
- Founded: 1986
- Language: English
- Headquarters: New York, New York, US
- Circulation: 20,001
- Price: Free to qualified subscribers. $159.99 to others in the U.S.
- ISSN: 0892-7278
- Website: TWICE magazine

Twice (ISSN 0892-7278) is a trade publication launched by publisher Richard Ekstract in 1987, currently owned by Future US along with its website. TWICE is an acronym for This Week In Consumer Electronics.

The editor-in-chief was Stephen Smith, until June 2014. He is now the Editor at Large. His replacement Editor-in-chief was John Laposky. He died on April 11, 2018, and was succeeded by Lisa Johnston, a longtime editor with the publication, until she departed the company in May, 2019. The editorial offices are located in New York City.

Established in 1987, TWICE magazine is published twice monthly with an extra issue in January and September. Common topics covered include consumer electronics and major appliance retailing and distribution, custom home installation and networking, home and portable audio and video equipment, digital imaging, portable digital communication devices, small office and home office products and technology, computer technology and accessories.

In May of each year, TWICE releases its Top 100 Consumer Electronics Retailers Report, an exclusive statistical ranking of CE retailers by the previous full year's dollar sales. Subsequent reports on the Top 100 Major Appliance Retailers, Top 25 Car Electronics Retailers, and Top 25 PC Retailers follow.

In 2009, owner Reed Business Information sold TWICE, Broadcasting & Cable and Multichannel News to NewBay Media.

In 2018, Future acquired NewBay Media.
