= Frank Newnam Jr. =

Frank Hastings Newnam Jr. (August 28, 1909 – March 4, 1998) was the third partner in the engineering partnership Lockwood, Andrews & Newnam, joining the firm in 1946. He served as national president of the American Society of Civil Engineers in 1968, and as president of its local chapter for 50 years. Newnam died on March 4, 1998, at the age of 88.
