= Hypsarrhythmia =

Disorganized brain electrical activity

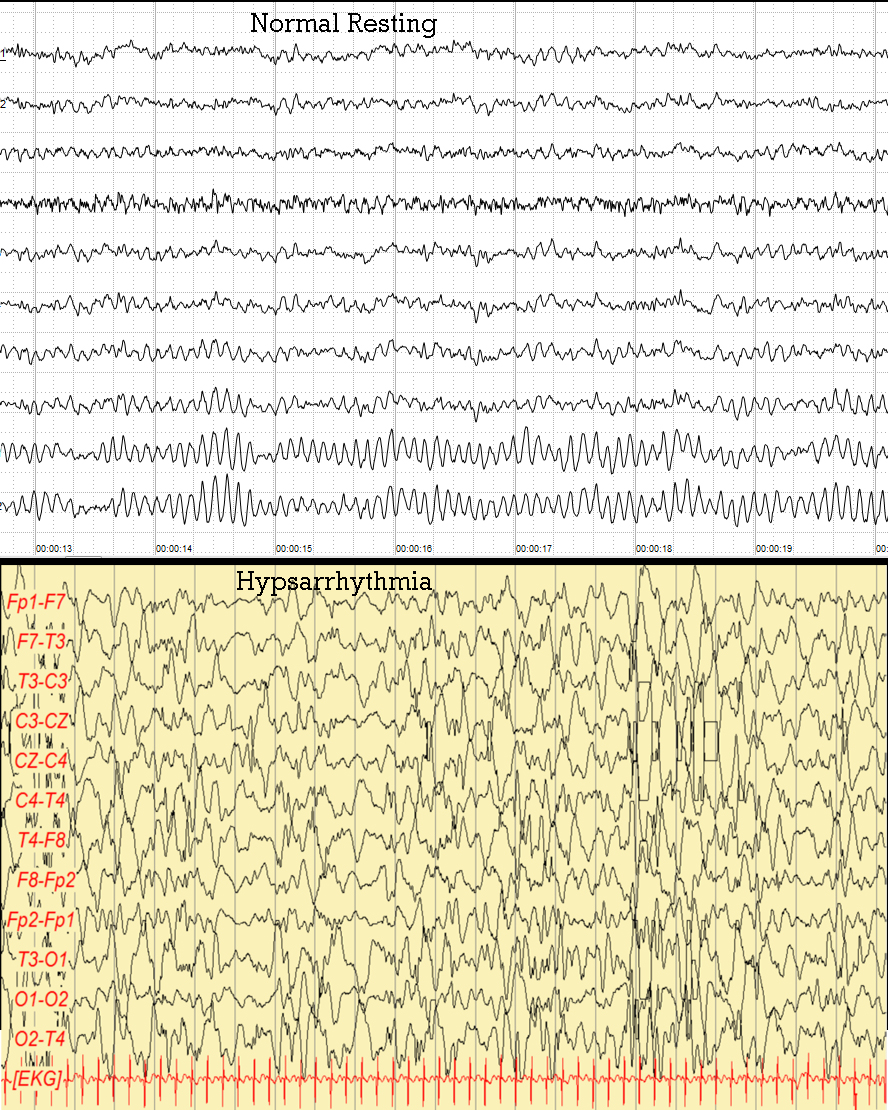
- A comparison of an awake, resting (with activity), normal EEG with a hypsarrhythmia EEG. The hypsarrhythmia EEG is from a 4-month old girl with cryptogenic West syndrome. In it high amplitude waves and spikes are present, randomly appearing and with no topographical distribution identified; also, there is no frequency nor amplitude gradient, indicating a highly disorganized brain activity. Although having this seemingly chaotic EEG, the patient didn't show any clinical seizures while being recorded.
- Specialty: Neurology

Hypsarrhythmia is very chaotic and disorganized brain electrical activity with no recognizable pattern, whereas a normal brain electrical activity shows clear separation between each signal and visible pattern. It is an abnormal interictal pattern, consisting of high amplitude and irregular waves and spikes in a background of chaotic and disorganized activity seen on electroencephalogram (EEG), and frequently encountered in infants diagnosed with infantile spasms, although it can be found in other conditions such as tuberous sclerosis.

Gibbs and Gibbs described hypsarrhythmia (originally spelled with one 'r') in 1952 as "...random high voltage waves and spikes. These spikes vary from moment to moment, both in time and in location. At time they appear to be focal, and a few seconds later they seem to originate from multiple foci. Occasionally the spike discharge becomes generalized, but it never appears as a rhythmically repetitive and highly organized pattern that could be confused with a discharge of the petit mal or petit mal variant type".

In most cases of infantile spasms, hypsarrhythmia either disappears or improves during a cluster of spasms or REM sleep. Hypsarrhythmia rarely persists beyond the age of 24 months.

== Classification ==
Through the use of video EEG and continuous monitoring, five variants of the "classical" hypsarrhythmic pattern have been identified:

1. Hypsarrhythmia with increased interhemispheric synchronization. Characterized by symmetric and synchronized activity, seen in patients with longstanding evolution, especially in those with West syndrome that changes to Lennox–Gastaut syndrome.
2. Asymmetric hypsarrhythmia. Associated with a brain structural abnormality, and does not necessarily predict the affected hemisphere.
3. Hypsarrhythmia with a consistent focus of abnormal discharge.
4. Hypsarrhythmia with episodes of voltage attenuation. Commonly seen during non-rapid eye movement (NREM) sleep. When the episodes of voltage attenuation appear at the same time as an epileptic spasm does, they are called electrodecrements.
5. Hypsarrhythmia with little spike or sharp activity.

The "H" in PEHO syndrome stands for hypsarrhythmia.

Together with developmental regression and infantile spasms, hypsarrhythmia is one of the diagnostic criteria for West syndrome.
