= Multi-room audio =

System allowing audio playback across many rooms

Multi-room audio (distributed audio) systems are audio systems that allow for playback and often control of music throughout an entire home or building. Numerous commercial systems provide this function, or a system can be custom built or homemade.

== Types ==
Whole house audio systems can be classified as: single source-single zone, single source-multiple zone or multiple source-multiple zone.

=== Single source, single zone ===
These systems distribute the same audio source everywhere—individual rooms must listen to the same audio source. This is the simplest type of system that can be installed. If designed properly, no special equipment is required other than one amplifier and a desired audio source. Care must be taken not to overload the amplifier by keeping the total speaker impedance above the amplifier's rated minimum impedance. This can be done by wiring the speakers in series, as opposed to parallel (though if the impedance is too high, power transfer is inefficient), with impedance-matching transformers, or by using constant-voltage transformers (often, 70 volts). These systems are commonly employed in retail environments and large buildings such as churches, where large, open areas benefit from additional speakers.

=== Single source, multiple zone ===
Separate volume controls are usually installed in each room or zone to compensate for differences in apparent volume due to room size and shape. Here especially, impedance-matching volume controls can be used to protect the amplifier from overload. This system design is otherwise the same as a single source, single zone in that all zones must listen to the same audio source, though volume control is independent in each room (and audio can be turned off in rooms, as desired).

=== Multiple source, multiple zone ===
These systems are the most advanced and flexible, and the most expensive. Different zones can select (and often control) different audio sources independently of other rooms. In contrast to the systems described above, this kind requires multiple amplifiers (at least one per source, but usually one per zone). This kind of system could be assembled from separate components (e.g. a splitter-router-matrix mixer, a processor, amplifiers and control panels), though knowledge of professional audio equipment and automation systems would be required. More commonly, commercial systems are employed to accomplish these tasks. Some systems distribute digital audio over Cat5 cable to amplifiers installed in each zone. Others have all equipment centralized and distribute speaker-level audio from the "headend" equipment location. Manufacturers of such equipment include NuVo and Zon.

== Speakers ==
Virtually any kind of audio speaker may be used in distributed audio applications. Home audio systems usually make use of in-ceiling and in-wall speakers or small "satellite" speakers. Larger venues often use larger speakers. For outdoor installations, speakers may be camouflaged as rocks or hidden in landscaping.
