= The Absolute Sound =

High-end home audio magazine

- Cover of the December 2024 issue
- Editor: Robert Harley
- Categories: High-end audio
- Frequency: Ten times a year
- Founder: Harry Pearson
- Founded: 1973
- Company: NextScreen, LLC.
- Country: United States
- Based in: Round Rock, Texas
- Language: English
- Website: theabsolutesound.com
- ISSN: 0097-1138

The Absolute Sound (TAS) is an American audiophile magazine which reviews high-end audio equipment, along with recordings and comments on various music-related subjects.

== History ==
The Absolute Sound was founded in 1973 by Harry Pearson, who was its editor-in-chief and publisher. In the early years, TAS was a quarterly, digest-sized magazine and accepted no advertisements. During the 1970s and 1980s, TAS (along with Stereophile) was influential in the audiophile industry. Pearson is credited as being the most important figure in the rise of high-end audio.

Until the mid- to late 1990s, Pearson owned and directed all rights to TAS. The magazine was published by Pearson Publishing Inc., which also published a sister high-end video review magazine published quarterly called The Perfect Vision. Pearson remained the chairman of its editorial advisory board until 2006 and regularly contributed a feature entitled HP's Workshop until his departure in 2012. The magazine is now published by NextScreen, LLC. of Round Rock, Texas.

The Absolute Sound was instrumental in the growth of the Audio hobby. Many areas of the hobby were introduced by the magazine, along with its competitor, Stereophile. These include building a vocabulary for high end audio and sound.
