= Jackknife (exercise) =

Abdominal exercise

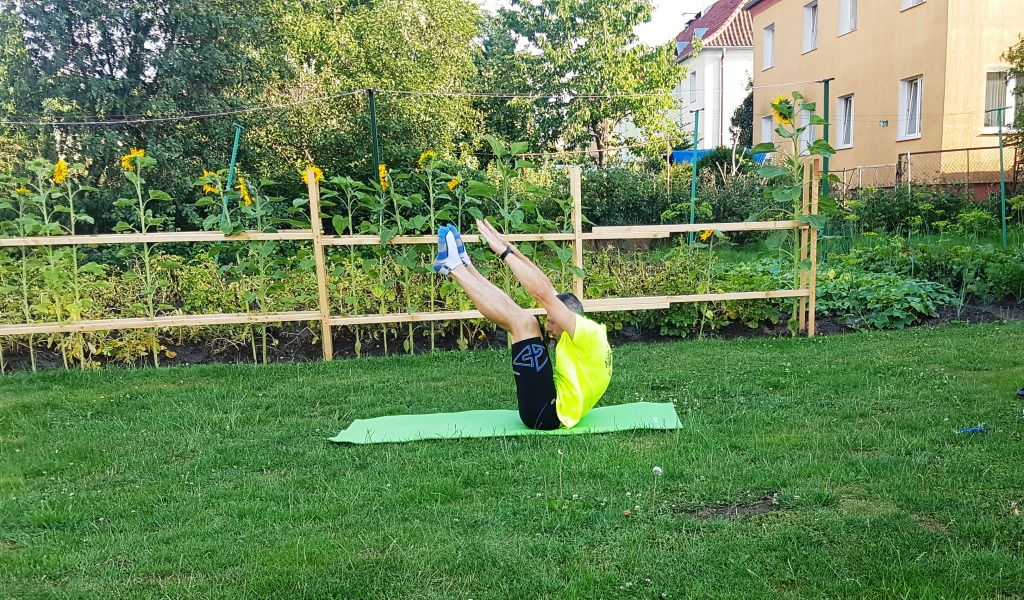

A jackknife is an abdominal exercise. This exercise is also known as a "V-Up". Jackknife exercises are designed to strengthen the upper and lower abdominal muscles, particularly the transversus abdominis muscle. There are a number of variations of jackknife exercises that allow people of different ages and ability to work their abdominal muscles. This exercise can be modified by using an exercise ball. The jackknife can be done by lying flat on your back with your arms extended overhead and your feet raised slightly above the floor. The jackknife is completed by slowly bringing your straight arms toward your hips, and lifting your upper torso off the floor.

== Instructions ==
- Preparation.- Sit on floor or mat. Lie supine with hands to sides.
- Execution.- Simultaneously raise knees and torso until hips and knees are flexed. Return to starting position with waist, hips and knees extended. Repeat.

== See also ==
- Wii Fit
