= William Newnham (physician) =

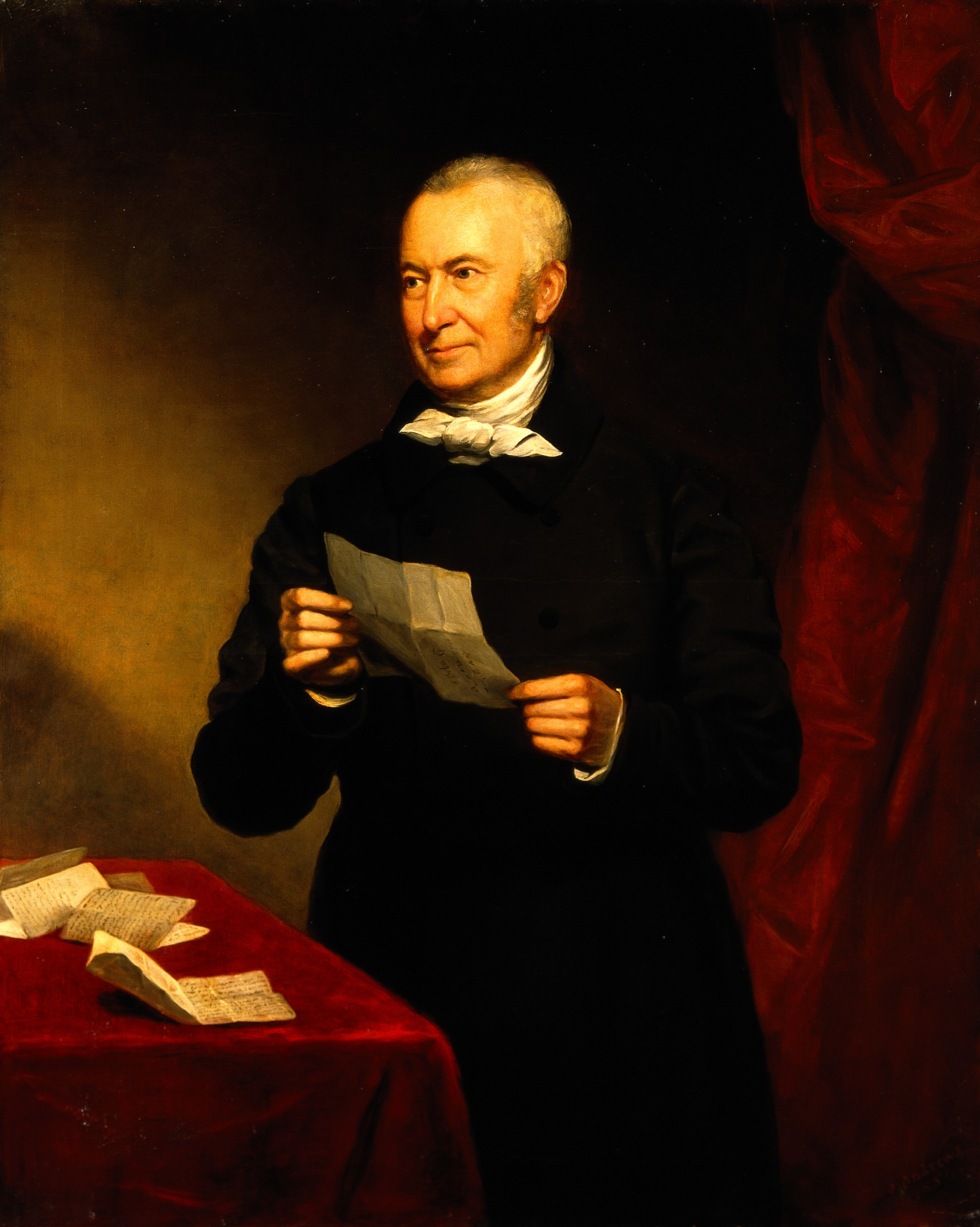
- Portrait by John Andrews, Wellcome Collection
- Born: 1790
- Died: 1865 (aged 74–75)
- Medical career
- Profession: physician

William Newnham (1790–1865) was a British physician.

He was born in Farnham, Surrey. He was qualified in apothecary. In 1836, he became one of the first members of the Provincial Medical and Surgical Association (later called the British Medical Association). He was also a member of the Royal Society of Literature.

He was the author of Essay on Superstition (1830) which argued that apparitional experiences, dreams and spiritual visions had a physiological rather than a supernatural basis. It was republished in 2010 by Cambridge University Press.

== Publications ==
- A Tribute of Sympathy Addressed to Mourners (1817)
- An Essay on Inversio Uteri (1818)
- The Principles of Physical, Intellectual, Moral, and Religious Education (two volumes, 1827)
- Essay on Superstition: Being an Inquiry into the Effects of Physical Influence on the Mind in the Production of Dreams, Visions, Ghosts, and Other Supernatural Appearances (1830)
- An Essay on the Disorders Incident to Literary Men, and on the Best Means of Preserving their Health (1836)
- The Reciprocal Influence of Body and Mind considered, as it affects the great questions of Education, Phrenology, Materialism (1842)
