= High-end audio =

Class of consumer home audio equipment

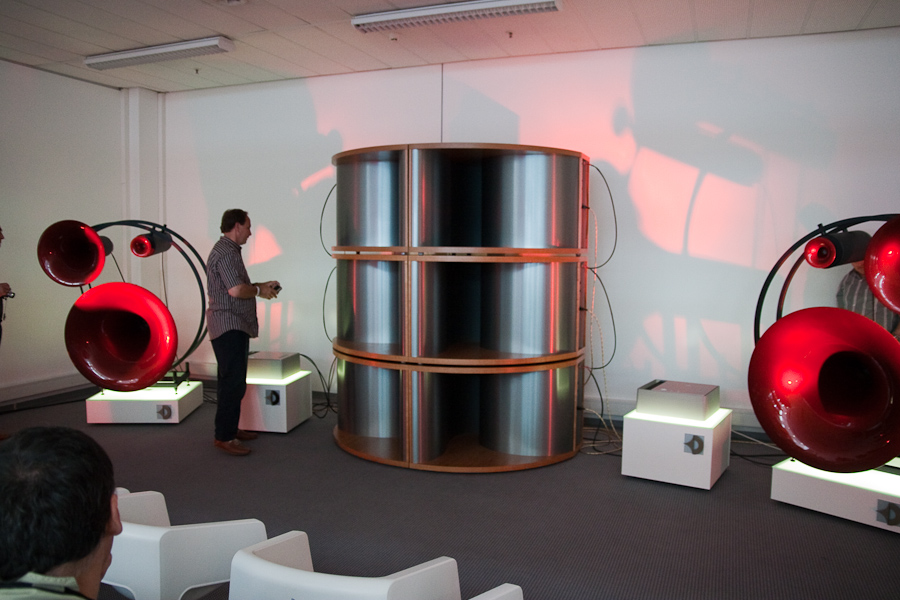
Avantgarde Acoustic Trio and Basshorn speakers

High-end audio is a class of consumer home audio equipment marketed to audiophiles on the basis of high price or quality, and esoteric or novel sound reproduction technologies. The term can refer simply to the price, to the build quality of the components, or to the subjective or objective quality of sound reproduction.

== Definition ==
The distinction between the terms high end and high fidelity is not well defined. According to one industry commentator, high-end could be defined as, "Gear below which's price and performance one could not go without compromising the music and the sound." Harry Pearson, founder of The Absolute Sound magazine, is widely acknowledged to have coined the term high-end audio.

== Costs ==
High-end audio equipment can be extremely expensive. It is sometimes referred to as cost-no-object equipment. Audiophile equipment can encompass the full range from budget to high-end in terms of price.

== Fidelity assessment ==
The fidelity of sound reproduction may be assessed subjectively or using audio system measurements. The human sense of hearing is subjective and difficult to define. Psychoacoustics is a division of acoustics that studies this field.

High or low figures of technical measurements do not necessarily offer a good representation of how the equipment sounds to each person. For example, some valve (vacuum tube) amplifiers produce greater amounts of total harmonic distortion, but this type of distortion (2nd harmonic) is not as disturbing to the ear as the higher-order distortions produced by early, poorly designed transistor equipment.

The validity of some products is questioned. These include accessories such as speaker wire utilizing exotic materials (including oxygen-free copper) and construction geometries, cable stands for lifting them off the floor (as a way to control mechanically induced vibrations), connectors, sprays and other tweaks.

== See also ==
- Audio noise measurement
- Broadcast quality
- Professional audio
- Stereophile, The Absolute Sound; high-end home audio magazines
