= Stereophile =

High-end home audio magazine

- Cover for the December 2024 issue
- Editor: Jim Austin
- Technical Editor: John Atkinson
- Categories: High-end audio
- Frequency: Monthly
- Total circulation: 72,159 (June 2013)
- Founder: J. Gordon Holt
- Founded: 1962
- First issue: September 1962
- Company: AVTech Media
- Country: United States
- Based in: New York City
- Language: English
- Website: www.stereophile.com
- ISSN: 0585-2544

Stereophile is a monthly American audiophile magazine which reviews high-end audio equipment, such as loudspeakers and amplifiers, and provides audio-related news.

== History ==
Stereophile was founded in 1962 by J. Gordon Holt. With the August 1987 issue, it started monthly publication.

In 1998, Stereophile was acquired by the Petersen Publishing Company. At this point, it was based in Santa Fe, New Mexico. During this period, it was published eight times a year. Petersen, which was acquired by Emap, was sold to Primedia (now Rent Group) in 2001. Primedia sold The Enthusiast Network, a New York–based publisher of special interest magazines, to Source Interlink Media in 2007.

In March 2018, Stereophile was purchased, along with related magazines and websites, by AVTech Media Ltd. from The Enthusiast Network.

On March 1, 2019, John Atkinson, who had joined the magazine in May 1986, announced that he was stepping down from his position as editor of Stereophile, but would continue his association with the magazine as Technical Editor, and that Jim Austin, formerly an editor at Science and a freelance contributor to Stereophile, would be taking over as Editor.

== Features ==
Features include its annual "Records to Live For" section, where each editor and writer reviews two outstanding albums of their choice; and the bi-annual "Recommended Components" issue in which audio equipment which has been reviewed in the recent past is classified as "A, B, C or D" level components, with "A" being the most highly recommended.

== Sister publications ==
Other notable publications also owned by AVTech Media include:

- Hi-Fi News
- Sound & Vision
