= PS Audio =

US high-end audio equipment manufacturer

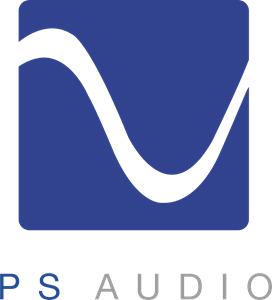
- Type: Private
- Industry: High-end audio
- Founded: 1973; 53 years ago
- Founder: Paul McGowan; Stan Warren
- Headquarters: Boulder, Colorado
- Area served: Worldwide
- Key people: Paul McGowan (CEO)
- Products: High-end audio equipment (DACs, amplifiers, preamplifiers, power conditioners, speakers)
- Number of employees: 20+
- Website: www.psaudio.com

PS Audio, Inc. is an American company specializing in high-fidelity audio components, commonly referred to as high-end audio equipment, for audiophiles and professional audio applications. The company manufactures audio amplifiers, preamplifiers, power-related products, digital-to-analog converters (DACs), streaming audio devices, and loudspeakers.

== Corporate history ==
PS Audio was founded in 1973 and shipped its first products in 1974. It was started by audio designers Paul McGowan and Stan Warren (with whose initials the company was named). Warren left the company in the early 1980s to form Superphon. His position as audio designer and co-owner was assumed by Dr. Bob Odell, an audio designer who had created notable Harman Kardon designs. McGowan left the company in 1990 to join Arnie Nudell of Infinity Systems to build high-end speakers with Genesis Technologies.

PS Audio was purchased in 1990 by Steve Jeffery and Randall Patton, and operated independently until 1998. During this time, the company introduced its Ultra series of products, based on technology developed by the Ultra Analog Corporation, including the UltraLink DAC (Stereophile magazine product of the year) and Lambda transport. Jeffery and Patton later purchased Ultra Analog and Threshold Corporation.

In early 1997, PS Audio Inc. ceased operations due to financial problems. Shortly thereafter, Paul McGowan bought back the name 'PS Audio', and has been the CEO and principal designer for new products since then. In December 1997, he left Genesis Technologies to work full-time for PS Audio. In the first quarter of 2000, the new PS Audio International grew quickly, and Peter Rudy was added as president. In 2002, former owner Steve Jeffery became president. In 2009 he retired from the company and James H. Laib assumed the role of general manager. Laib became the company's president in 2015.

As of July, 2019, PS Audio employs 51 people, nearly half of whom support its engineering team. Manufacturing takes place at PS Audio's Boulder Colorado facility, and the company ships products worldwide.

== Historic products ==
=== Pre-1990s ===
PS Audio's first product was a standalone phono preamplifier, sold direct to consumers for $59.95. The small unit had a passive RIAA curve sandwiched between two 709C op amps running in class A mode and considered state of the art at the time for solid state. Later iterations of the phono preamplifier were introduced that moved away from the use of integrated IC op amps and moved to discrete high-voltage solid state amplification modules, retaining the passive RIAA curve. Models include the II and the III.

To augment the company's standalone phono preamplifiers, standalone line stage preamplifiers were introduced next, known as Linear Control Centers or LCC. One of the innovative features of the LCC was a bypass switch that permitted the user to select the use of an internal amplification module or straight into the potentiometer for volume control. Originally labeled 0 dB (line stage in) or -20 dB (passive only) this feature remained with all future PS Audio line stages and preamplifiers, later becoming labeled Straightwire in or out.

With the advent of the III phono stage, the form factor moved from no faceplate to a small 8.5" rack style faceplate enabling owners to combine the two chassis into one unit, thus forming the first PS Audio preamplifier with phono input. This series marked the end of the first era of modular chassis approach to preamplification.

Later preamplifier offering included the PS IV, the company's first 17" full chassis design and featured an external power supply for the first time in the American high-end audio industry. The IV featured a built in phono preamplifier with a novel switch on the bottom of the unit enabling users to select Moving Coil or Moving Magnet cartridges. Instead of adding in another circuit known as a head amp to increase the gain for Moving Coil cartridges, the IV took advantage of its passive RIAA curve design and simply increased the gain of the input amplification stage by an additional 30 dB. All future preamplifiers pre-1997 had this unique circuit that reduced the circuitry in the path of the phono cartridge.

During the same era (late 1970s) PS Audio introduced its first power amplifier, the Model One, a solid state design producing 70 watts per channel into 8 Ohms and 140 watts per channel into 4 Ohms. The design was a classic AB amplifier design featuring the company's first full 19" chassis design, large power supply, low feedback and minimalist design constraints. The Model One was later followed with the world's first Audiophile integrated amplifier introduced by an American High-End company, the Elite. Based on the Model One architecture, the Elite integrated the Linear Control Center into a Model One amplifier chassis. The Model One was replaced by the Model II, moving back to a smaller modular chassis approach at 8.5" with faceplate. The Model II produced 40 watts per channel into 8 Ohms, 70 watts per channel into 4 Ohms and had a Bridging switch enabling the user to bridge the internal stereo amplifiers into one mono amplifier, producing 160 watts into 4 Ohms. The Model II was followed by the IIC, featuring the same circuitry placed into a standard 19" rack mount chassis. The IIC introduced a new concept to the Audiophile marketplace, use of a separate external power supply for an amplifier. Users could choose from two models of external power supply, one as standard and an upgrade to a larger High Current version. The concept of an external power supply was first introduced on the PS Audio IV preamplifier and later applied to power amplifiers like the IIC. The concept became known as the High Current Power Supply or HCPS and was popular because improvements to the sound quality were gained by moving to a larger power supply, both in the application of the preamplifier as well as power amplifiers. The model IIC is factory rated at 55 watts into 8 ohms and 200 watts bridged mode (400 watts into 4 ohms bridged). The IIC Plus is rated at 70 watts into 8 ohms. Amplifier successors to the IIC included the 250 Delta monoblock and the 100 Delta amplifier.

In the early 1980s and with the advent of the Compact Disc, PS was one of the first American high-end audio manufacturers to modify one of the few CD players of the day by replacing its internal audio amplification stage following the internal D to A player. The first and only modified CD player introduced by the company was the CD-1 based on the Philips Magnavox line of CD players. The company engineers chose the Magnavox unit because the belief at the time was it sounded better to its only rival in the marketplace, the Sony. Inside the CD 1 PS engineers added a discrete high voltage line stage and power supply, replacing the NE5532 op amps used as the output amplification stage of the Magnavox. This unit was a stopgap product designed to get the company "in the game" of this new format that would someday challenge vinyl, the company's core products addressed. In the background, PS engineers were working to figure out a way to utilize the CD players digital output and create a standalone D to A converter. In late 1982, the company succeeded in releasing the first high-end standalone D to A converter known as the Digital Link. Other manufacturers such as Arcam and Theta were also on the same path and both companies released competing D to A processors within several months of the Digital Link's introduction From this point onwards, the company has produced a succession of DACs with the same goal in mind - that of supplanting the built in DAC and line stage of CD players. Later advances in CD technology led the high-end audio industry to release a new category of product called a CD Transport that contained no DAC and meant to use as a pair which became known as a DAC and Transport combination.

=== 1990–1997 ===
From 1990 to 1997, co-founder McGowan left the company and joined Infinity founder Arnie Nudell to form Genesis Loudspeakers. During the 7-year period between 1990 and 1997 the company was owned and operated by Steve Jeffery, President and general manager and Randy Patton, VP of sales, marketing and product development.

Products during this era of the company took a somewhat different direction under the design guidance of Dr. Robert Odell and product development VP Randy Patton (Sumo). Preamplifiers built during this era included the 6.0 and 6.5 and were IC op amp based rather than discrete high-voltage designs of the past era. It was during this time period the company acquired a more modern look to the industrial design.

The biggest contributions to the company product legacy was the line of digital audio products engineered by the outside vendor Ultra Analog located in the Bay Area. Ultra Analog, headed by Dick Powers, was an engineering centric ODM/OEM producing some of the world's first 24 bit DAC modules. These modules were hybrids potted in epoxy and were built around multiple Burr Brown 16 and 18 bit DAC chips. The first products from this partnership were the PS Audio Ultralink DAC, Reference Link DAC and A/D converter and Lambda transport. The Ultralink garnered Stereophile magazines product of the year. The Lambda transport was built around a Marantz CD mechanism. The Ultralink, Reference Link and Lambda transport were designed and built by Ultra Analog and marketed under the PS brand for nearly 5 years. PS Audio Inc. acquired Ultra Analog in 1994.

In 1995 PS Audio also acquired Hales loudspeakers and the Threshold Corporation. Following the two acquisitions Randy Patton purchased all shares of PS Audio from Steve Jeffery and owned 100% of the corporation. Steve Jeffery went on to be appointed President of the Wadia Corporation, a competing high-end audio DAC manufacturer.

Patton ran PS Audio and the Threshold Corporation until 1997 when the entity ceased operations and declared bankruptcy. Steve Jeffery, the primary creditor of the corporation, liquidated the remaining assets of the company and sold the name PS Audio back to McGowan for $1, who restarted operations in 1998.

== Modern products ==
=== 1997–2014 ===
With the return of co-founder McGowan to PS Audio, the company returned to audio work by producing an entirely new category of product, the AC regenerator. McGowan reasoned that in order to return the company to viability in a very crowded and competitive market it was necessary to take a Blue Ocean Strategy and provide a product that solved a major problem in all high-end systems, the AC power feeding them.

Realizing that the (then) infantile power conditioning category consisted only of filters that cleaned power line noise and did not address the larger issues of voltage regulation and sine wave purity, a new type of product called a regenerator was created. The first regenerator prototype was large stereo power amplifier fed by a low distortion Hewlett-Packard sine wave oscillator. Each channel of the power amplifier produced 60 volts AC and when a load was placed across the two out of phase channels of the amplifier, the required 120 volts AC was achieved to power products. The research and prototype phase of the regenerator included various listening tests at different frequencies and 400 Hz was found to sound best (50 Hz and 60 Hz is standard) when equipment was powered by the amplifier. Further research negated the use of 400 Hz sine waves because many tube amplification systems were not filtered well enough at higher frequencies and the 400 Hz tone could be heard through the system. 60 Hz was the final design choice and the first product was launched. It was called a Power Plant and the model was the P300, producing up to 300 watts of regenerated, regulated AC power.

The P300 was designed to produce up to 300 watts of clean power to connected audio equipment. The P-300 had a digital sine wave stored in memory, which it passed through a digital-to-analog converter and then amplified to 117V (adjustable) at a frequency of 60 Hz (adjustable). Thus, connected equipment was provided with a precise 117V, 60 Hz power signal (in the US, other countries had units for their specific voltage and frequency) lacking noise from the utility company. The P-300 provided, in theory, perfect noise free power of the same specifications that the power company should be providing. Various additional "waves" known as "multiwave" were also provided.

The P-300 is a historically important product in high-end audio as it helped redefine and popularize the Power Conditioner product category and spawned imitation. This even though companies such as Accuphase followed with their own concept of power regeneration (though not additional waves, i.e., "multiwave" which PS audio claims provide additional benefits).

More powerful models of the P-300 were introduced including the P600, P1000, P1200 and P1000. The P-500 and P-1000 provided up to 500 and 1000 watts of "clean" power to connected equipment but with the penalty of generating a tremendous amount of heat in the process. Because Power Plants utilized a traditional analog class A/B stereo power amplifier they were only 50% efficient. This meant that for every watt delivered to the load, an identical watt of heat was generated, thus requiring massive heat sinks to dissipate the heat. On August 21, 2007, US patent 7259705 was issued to PS Audio for the design rights to a new efficient tracking power regenerator that improved efficiency from 50% to 85% based on the same principles of regeneration. That same year, PS Audio introduced the Power Plant Premier, the first of its new AC Regenerator products to utilize this tracking AC technology it patented. In 2010, the current generation of AC regenerators was launched and carry the model PerfectWave.

For high end cables, PS audio offered the "Lab" cable line which was replaced by the "Lab II" line, which was replaced by the "XStream" cable line. Currently the power cable line is the PerfectWave Power Cable line.

PS audio offered the PCA II preamplifier. This was discontinued and replaced with the GCP-200 preamplifier. Each had an optional phono stage and external power supply option.

For amplifiers, PS audio offered the HCA-2 "digital" amplifier. This was a switching amplifier (many would call this a Class D Amplifier) that provide about 150 watts per channel. A more conventional amplifier, the Classic 250, provided 250 Watts per channel. These amplifiers were discontinued and the follow-on amplifiers were all "digital" type amplifiers from the GCA line, which had flexibility in the number of channels or number of watts per channel desired.

=== 2014–present ===
In recent years the company has grown dramatically in size, product range, and presence. The DirectStream DAC, launched in 2014, brought unique technologies to a DAC field crowded with similar chip-based solutions. Designer Ted Smith created a DAC based upon an FPGA (field-programmable gate array) which would allow owners to download and install no-cost firmware/OS upgrades which improve the unit's performance over time, and ensure that it does not become obsolete. As of July, 2019, the company has offered nine OS upgrades; recent ones have been named after "fourteeners", Colorado peaks which top 14,000 feet in height. The most recent of these is "Snowmass", released in November, 2018. The DirectStream also converts all inputs to DSD for processing; in Snowmass, signals are converted to 20 x the nominal SACD rate (56.338Mhz) and then converted back down to quad rate DSD (11.2896 MHz), with the output stage being a passive low-pass filter. Thousands of DirectStream DACs have been sold, with many in use in recording studios and as reference components by reviewers.

Sprout, a compact integrated amplifier featuring a phono stage, Bluetooth, and a headphone amp, was introduced in a Kickstarter campaign in 2014; subsequently, thousands of units were sold. In 2018 a second generation unit, Sprout100, was introduced; the name reflected the increased power output of 100 watts/channel into 4 ohms. Other improvements included a fully asynchronous DAC that can handle 384/24 PCM or double rate DSD; dedicated subwoofer output; optional bass boost; high-quality, metal remote control; analog RCA inputs and outputs; and a TOSLINK optical input.

Since 2015, PS has released three amplification products designed by industry veteran Bascom H. King, under the line name of BHK Signature. During more than 40 years in audio, King has designed products for Infinity, Marantz, Conrad Johnson, Constellation, and Audeze, among many others, and the BHK Signature line represents the culmination of all his experience and knowledge. The BHK Signature Preamplifier input stage features two 12AU7 dual triode vacuum tubes, which act as a zero-feedback balanced input amplification pair. Volume is controlled by a combination of an input stepped attenuator, built around the highest quality passive components for coarse volume adjustments, after which the actual gain of the vacuum tube is controlled, for finer steps. The control is designed to have no sonic signature of its own. The unit's output stage is a high-bias class-A MOSFET design that is unaffected by cable and power amplifier interface challenges. The BHK Pre also includes a headphone amp possessing extremely low/near zero output impedance, zero feedback, and featuring discrete MOSFET circuitry.

There are two amplifier models in the BHK Signature line: the Stereo 250 and Mono 300. Both utilize vacuum tube input stages and MOSFET outputs; the Stereo 250 produces 250 watts/per channel into an 8Ω loudspeaker, 500 watts/channel into 4Ω, and is stable into 2Ω. The Mono 300 produces 300 watts into 8Ω, 600 into 4Ω and more than 1,000 watts into 2Ω. The Mono 300 doubles the output current with half the impedance of the stereo model, by doubling every internal component of the 250 into one unit: double tubes, double power supplies, transistors, capacitors and resistors.

The high-value Stellar line was introduced in 2017, designed to bring PS Audio performance to lower-priced, full-sized components. The line was launched with three products: the Gain Cell DAC/preamp. the S300 stereo amp, and the M700 mono amps. The Gain Cell DAC is a moderately-priced combination DAC and preamp that also incorporates a high-performance headphone amp; the S300 produces 140 watts per channel into 8Ω; 300 watts per channel into 4Ω; and is stable into a 2Ω load. The M700 offers a measurable increase in performance that is immediately audible, is the least-expensive amplifier listed in Class A of Stereophile magazines Recommended Components list, and is also one of the most powerful. Its 350 watts into 8Ω, 700 watts into 4Ω, and stability into a 2Ω load ensure that the M700 can drive any loudspeaker. In March 2019, the Stellar P3 Power Plant was introduced, bringing PS Power Regenerator power technology to a lower price-point. A Stellar phono preamp will be introduced in Q3 of 2019, and a Stellar integrated amplifier will be released in 2020.

The Power Plant line of power regenerators has been periodically improved. Newer models consist of the P12, P15, and P20 Power Plants, differing primarily in their power-handling capacity and number of outlets. All three models utilize FPGA-based DSD sine wave generators. Both the P12 and P20 are listed in Stereophile's Recommended Components list.

At Rocky Mountain Audio Fest in October 2018, PS exhibited the final prototype loudspeakers created by the late Arnie Nudell, founder of both Infinity Systems and Genesis Technologies and longtime friend of and mentor to PS Audio. These speakers featured several characteristic Nudell design features: dual servo-controlled, powered woofers; a cone mid-bass coupler; a ribbon linesource midrange; and a line array of spiral ribbon tweeters. While these design points do not necessarily reflect how future PS Audio loudspeakers will be designed, they do serve as a basis for experimentation and developments.

At Axpona in April, 2019, PS showed an initial prototype of the AN3 loudspeaker, intended to be the smallest of the AN line of speakers inspired by Arnie Nudell's work. Development continues in the AN line, which will eventually consist of the AN3, the smallest; the AN2, larger and more elaborate; and the AN1, a full-scale assault upon the state of the art, along the lines of the legendary Infinity IRS V. Less-expensive speakers are intended to be introduced below the AN line: a Stellar line, also consisting of 3 models; and at least one Sprout loudspeaker, designed to be compatible with the Sprout 100 in both appearance and capabilities.

The company's outreach has greatly increased in recent years, by way of co-founder/CEO Paul McGowan's Daily Posts; his "Ask Paul" videos on YouTube; and Copper, a twice-monthly webzine devoted to music and audio that appears on the PS Audio website. PS Audio products have won many awards worldwide, including Editors' Choice awards from Stereophile and The Absolute Sound magazines; since 2017, PS has had more products on Stereophile's Recommended Component lists than any other electronics manufacturer.
