= McIntosh Laboratory =

American audio equipment company

Coordinates: 42.100129°N 75.875136°W

McIntosh Laboratory, Inc.
- Type: Subsidiary
- Industry: Electronics
- Founded: 1949; 77 years ago
- Founders: Frank H. McIntosh; Gordon Gow
- Headquarters: Binghamton, New York, U.S.
- Products: Audio equipment
- Parent: McIntosh Group
- Website: mcintoshlabs.com

McIntosh Laboratory is an American manufacturer of high-end audio equipment that is headquartered in Binghamton, New York. It is a subsidiary of McIntosh Group, which in November 2024 was acquired by Bose Corporation, an American audio company.

The company was co-founded in 1949 by Frank H. McIntosh and Gordon Gow. McIntosh designs and produces audio amplifiers, stereo tuners, loudspeakers, turntables, music streamers, processors, and various other audio products. Although solid state components are a large segment of the McIntosh line, audio enthusiasts most revere the warm sound of the company's tube amplifiers. Some of their tube amplifiers were ranked among the finest ever created for home audio and theater use. Their Unity Coupled Circuit, patented at the brand's inception, is still used today in products like their MC275 amplifier, whose vacuum tubes—used in many of the company's products—help to impart a lifelike warmth and soul to the sound. "McIntosh transformers are hand-wound in house as they've always been." According to McIntosh president, Charlie Randall, Many of the employees working at the Binghamton plant have been with the company for decades and number approximately 170+ as of June, 2022.

McIntosh audio products can usually be recognized by their black glass front panels (circa 1960's to present), iconic blue VU meters (circa 1974 to present), and iconic gothic logo. The Mcintosh factory has a black facade with blue tinted windows to align with the company's trademark theme.

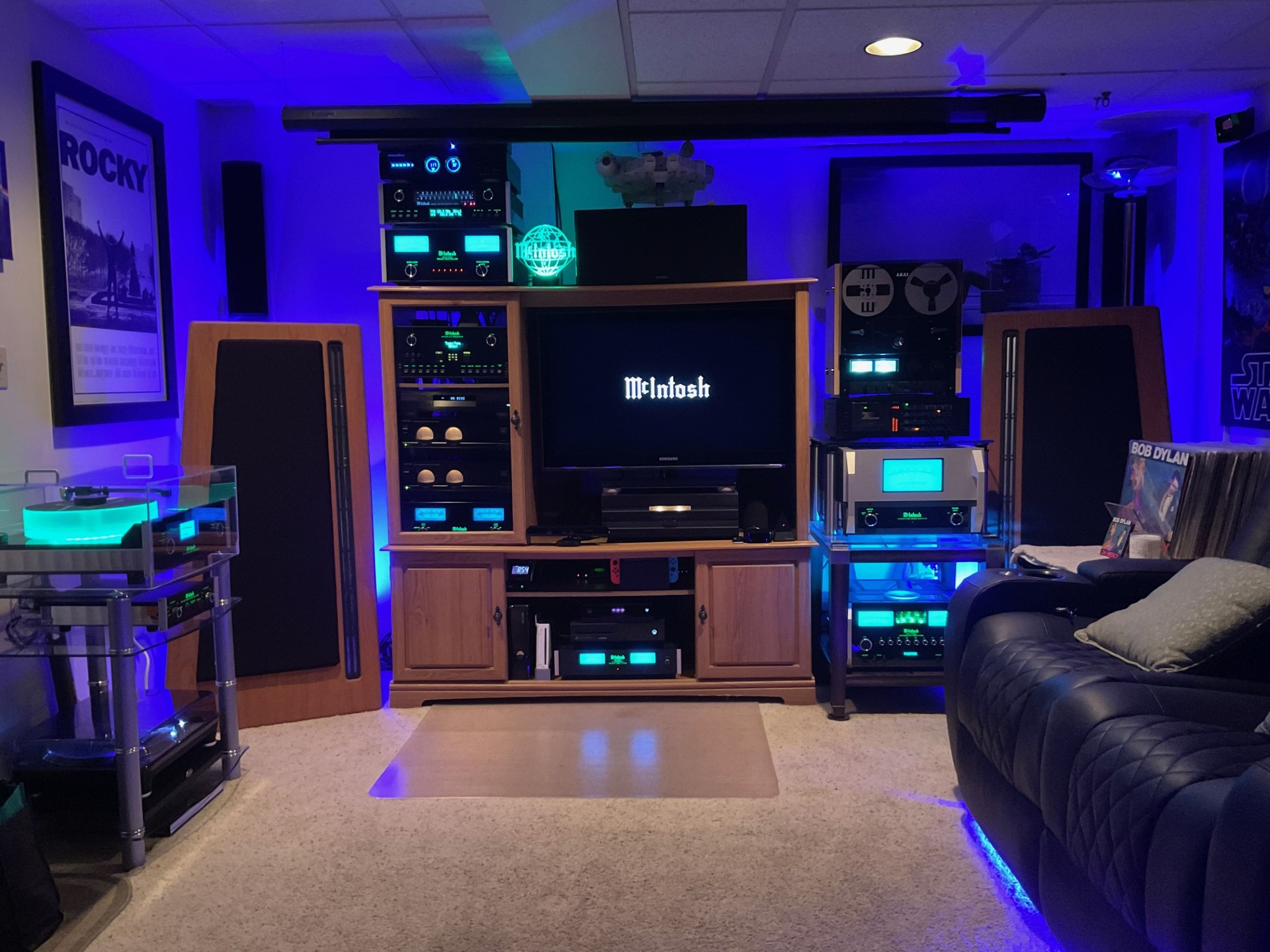
McIntosh system with iconic blue meters

== Company history and highlights ==
Frank H. McIntosh and Gordon Gow co-founded McIntosh in 1949. The company was originally located in Silver Spring MD. It moved to Binghamton NY in 1951.

Dave O'Brien joined McIntosh in 1962. He led the McIntosh Amplifier Clinics for the next 29 years. Dave retired on June 11, 1999, after 38 years of service with McIntosh.

In 1965, Mcintosh amps were used to power President Lyndon B. Johnson’s inauguration speech.

McIntosh created a Loudspeaker division in 1967.

McIntosh amplifiers were used at the Woodstock Music Festival in 1969. A battery of twenty McIntosh MC3500 tube amplifiers were used to power the JBL speakers at Woodstock for the 400,000+ fans in attendance. Urban legend has it that these amps needed to be cooled by ice on the hot August days so they would not overheat but McIntosh Laboratory Inc President, Charlie Randall, dismissed the tale as folk lore saying "Any ice packed around the amps in the middle of August would have quickly melted and the resulting water would have caused massive issues with the electronics".

On March 23, 1974, the Grateful Dead's "Wall of Sound" debuted at the Cow Palace in Daly City, CA (and then subsequently on other tour locations). It reportedly used forty-eight 300-watt per channel (600 wpc in a bridged monoblock configuration) McIntosh model MC2300 solid state amplifiers for a total of 28,800 watts of continuous power to power a speaker system over 100 feet wide and three stories tall.

While staying at the Plaza Hotel in 1976, The Beatles George Harrison requested a McIntosh sound system by name. At 2am that night, four JBL S8Rs and a rack mount of McIntosh power amplifiers, preamplifiers, and a turntable were delivered to his room. The music volume was so loud that other guests and employees could hear it throughout the hotel. Others claimed they heard the music from up to five blocks away. This resulted in him being thrown out of the hotel the following day.

In October 1977, Gordon Gow became president and CEO when Mr. McIntosh retired. Mr. McIntosh sold his stock shares to top management and a few dedicated McIntosh investors. He was retained with a salary on a consulting basis. He moved from his home in Endicott, NY to Scottsdale, Arizona.

Apple and the Apple logo are registered
trademarks of Apple Computer, Inc.
Macintosh is a trademark of McIntosh
Laboratory, Inc. and is being used with
express permission of its owner.

— Macintosh Plus 1Mb computer back label

Apple co-founder, Steve Jobs, reached a settlement agreement with McIntosh president, Gordon Gow, to use the name Macintosh for Apple's start-up personal computer line. Although the brand names have a different spelling, they sounded enough alike when pronounced that the agreement required a placard to be placed on the back of the Macintosh Plus 1MB computer starting in March 1983. In March 1986, Apple gained exclusive license rights to use the Macintosh name for an undisclosed but substantial sum of money.

=== Japanese years ===
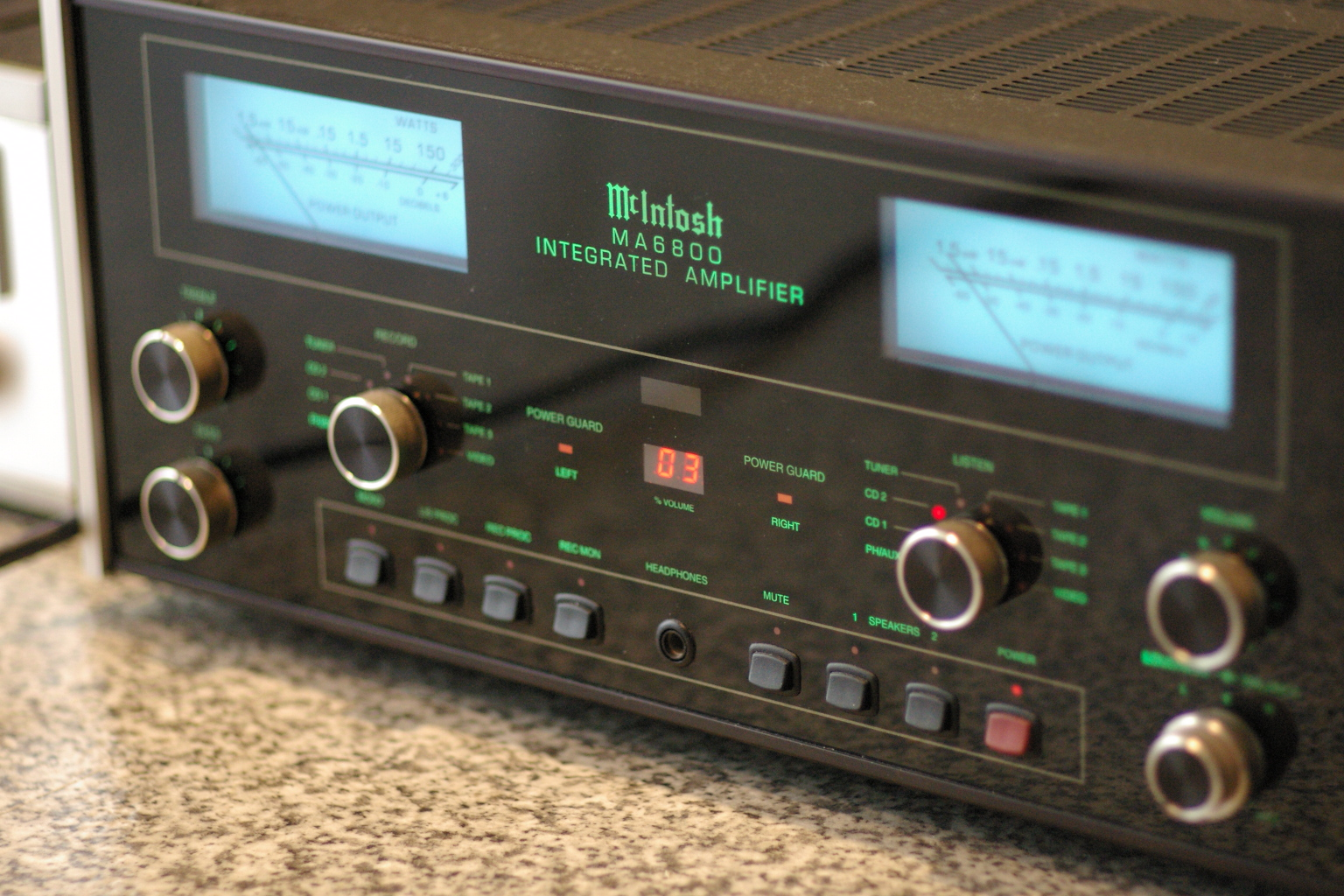
McIntosh MA6800 integrated amplifier

The company began to struggle after years of growth and was ultimately acquired by Clarion, a Japanese manufacturer of car stereo gear in 1990 for 28.6 million dollars. McIntosh components, particularly the early tube models, are highly regarded in Japan. In a speech shortly after the purchase, Clarion president Yutaka Oyamada told McIntosh employees that "we like McIntosh as it is, and we have no intention of changing what has made it so successful." After the Clarion purchase, McIntosh expanded into car audio and home theater.

In 2002, McIntosh developed the Harley-Davidson riser mount radio. Sold through Harley dealerships, the radio could be added to many Harley models that lacked mobile audio.

In May 2003, Clarion sold McIntosh Laboratory to D&M Holdings also of Japan. The company continued to operate independent engineering, design, and divisions.

=== Italian years and return to the United States ===
On October 8, 2012, Fine Sounds SpA of Milan, Italy, announced it had purchased McIntosh. In May 2014, the CEO of Fine Sounds Group, along with the President of McIntosh Labs, led a management buyout of the Fine Sounds Group from its Italian investment firm owner, Quadrivio Investment Group.

Since then, Fine Sounds Group has renamed itself McIntosh Group and relocated from Milan to New York. McIntosh Group is a holding company for the brands McIntosh Laboratory, Sonus Faber, Sumiko Phono Cartridges, Fine Sounds Americas, Fine Sounds BeNelux, and Fine Sounds U.K. It has also partnered Sonus Faber with Maserati and partnered McIntosh Audio with Jeep. Jeff Poggi and Charlie Randall were named Co-CEO's in 2017 of McIntosh Group. Daniel Pidgeon is the current CEO of McIntosh Group (since June 2022).

Charlie Randall is the current President of McIntosh Laboratory (since 2001).

Dallas-based private investment firm Highlander Partners, acquired McIntosh Group (which includes McIntosh Laboratory) as part of their equity portfolio in June 2022. McIntosh Laboratory's revenue was $25 million and $42 million in 2021 and 2022, respectively. On 19 November 2024, Highlander Partners announced the sale of McIntosh Group to Bose Corporation for an undisclosed sum.

== Legacy ==
On November 7, 2017, McIntosh founders Frank McIntosh and Gordon Gow were posthumously inducted into the Consumer Technology Hall of fame in a ceremony held at the Rainbow room in New York City. This honor is bestowed upon those who have made a significant impact in the technology sector with products and technologies that improve lives around the world.

The World of McIntosh Experience Center was a 12,000 square foot, five story townhouse located in the SoHo district of New York. It was open for tours from 2015 to 2021 and was used as a retail showroom for McIntosh, as well as for private events such as movie screenings, art exhibits, and presentations. On September 21, 2023, an 11,000 square foot townhome labeled The McIntosh House of Sound opened in NYC's Chelsea District. Similar to the World of McIntosh Experience Center, it showcases audio products from McIntosh, Sonus faber, Pro-Ject, Rotel, and Sumiko.

In addition to past celebrities such as Howard Hughes George Harrison, and Jerry Garcia, some notable artists and audio aficionados who own McIntosh gear for personal use today are John Mayer, The Rolling Stones, Paul McCartney, Jimmy Fallon, Tom Cruise and Bob Weir.

== Products ==
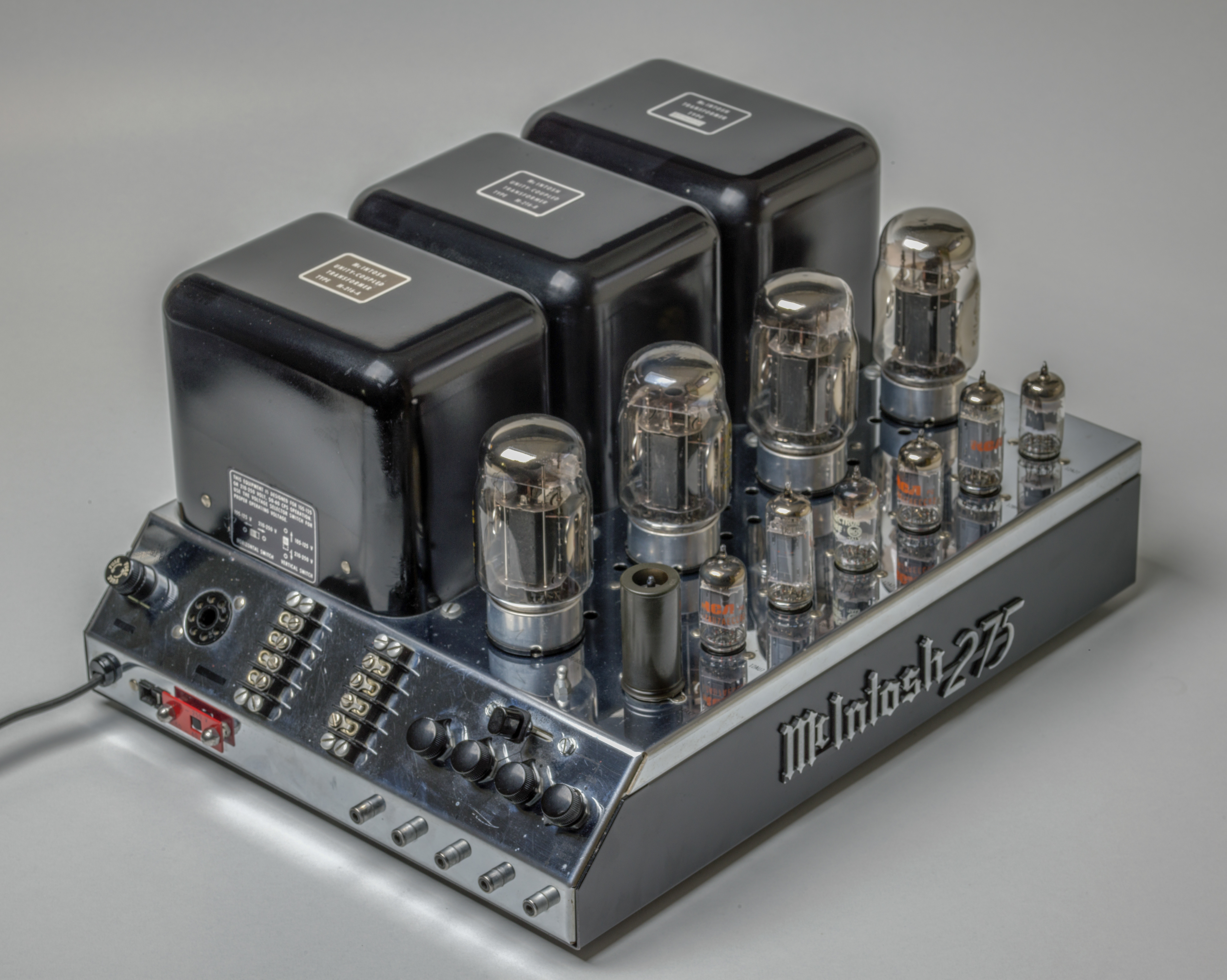
MC275 (European version with 220/110 V switch (red)

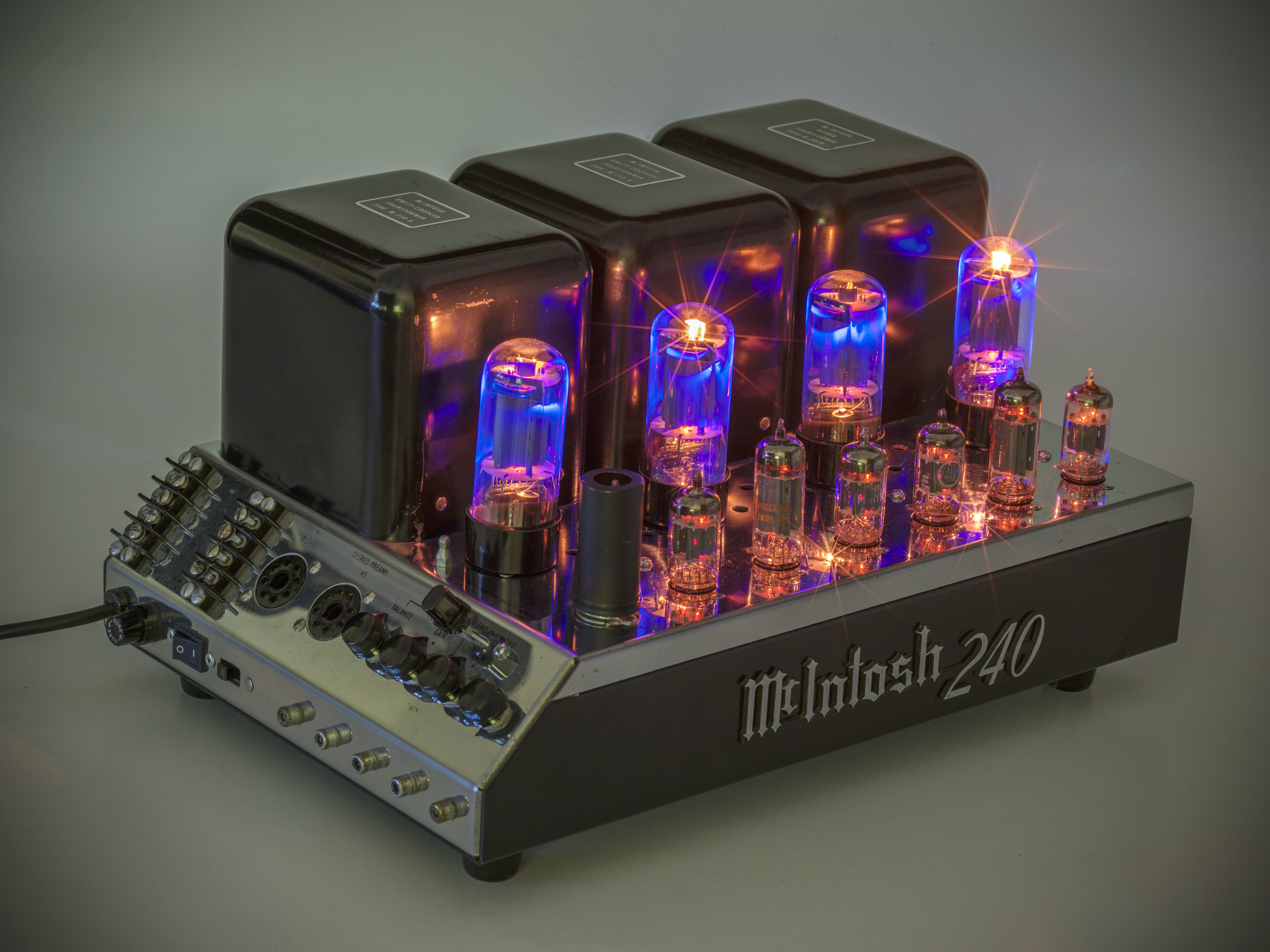
MC240, early version of 1961 (long-exposure)

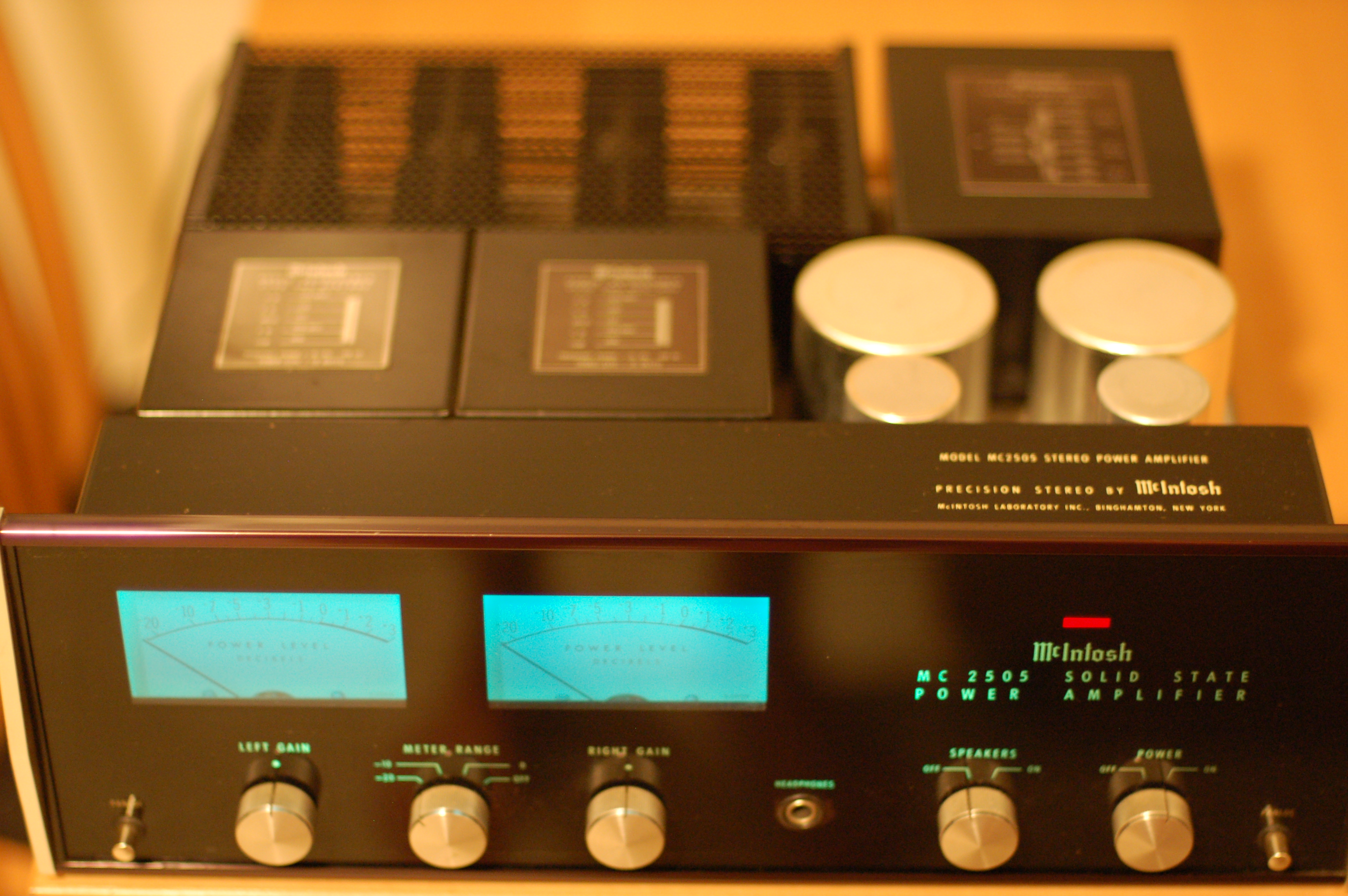
MC2505 solid-state stereo power amplifier

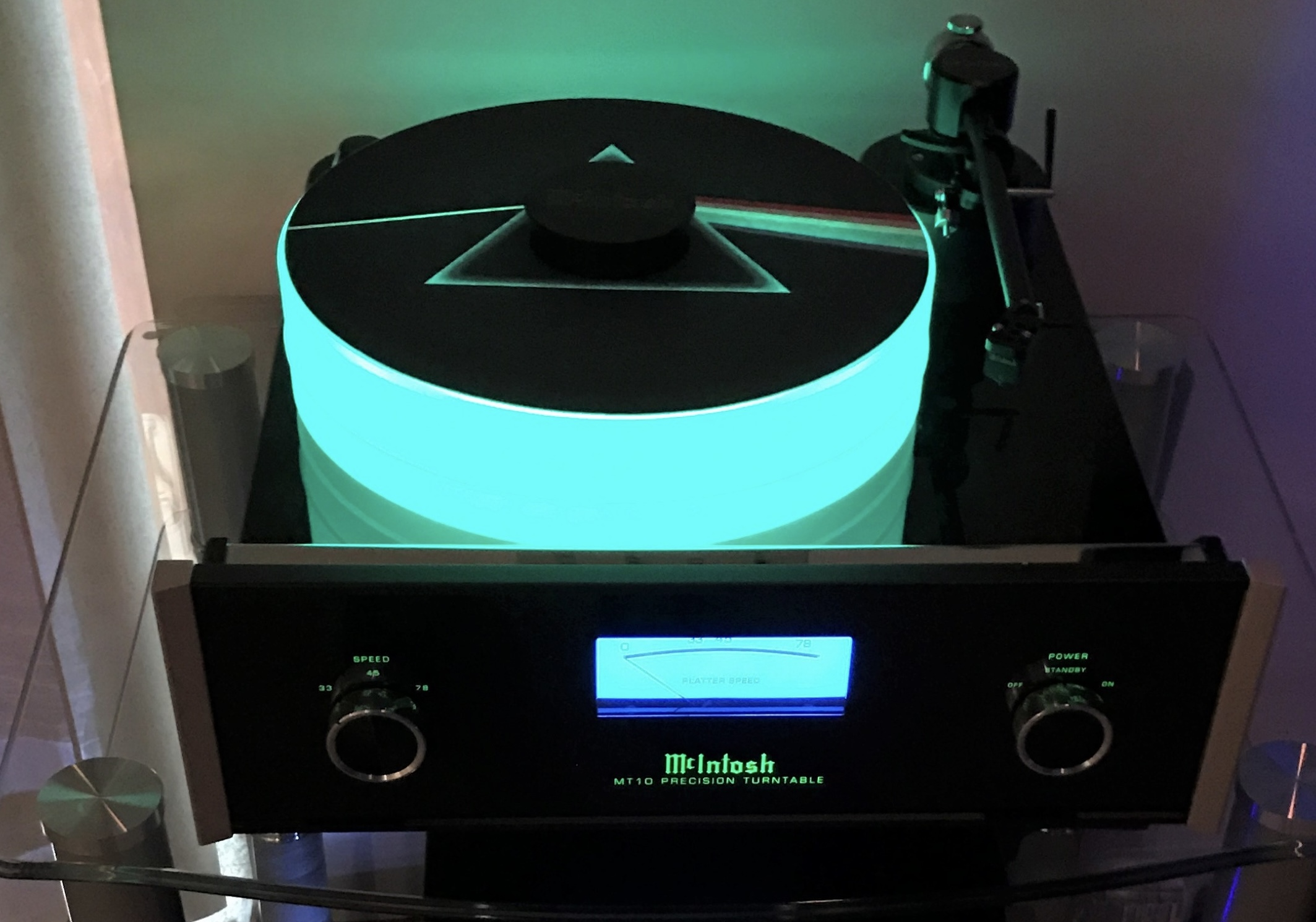
McIntosh MT10 Precision Turntable

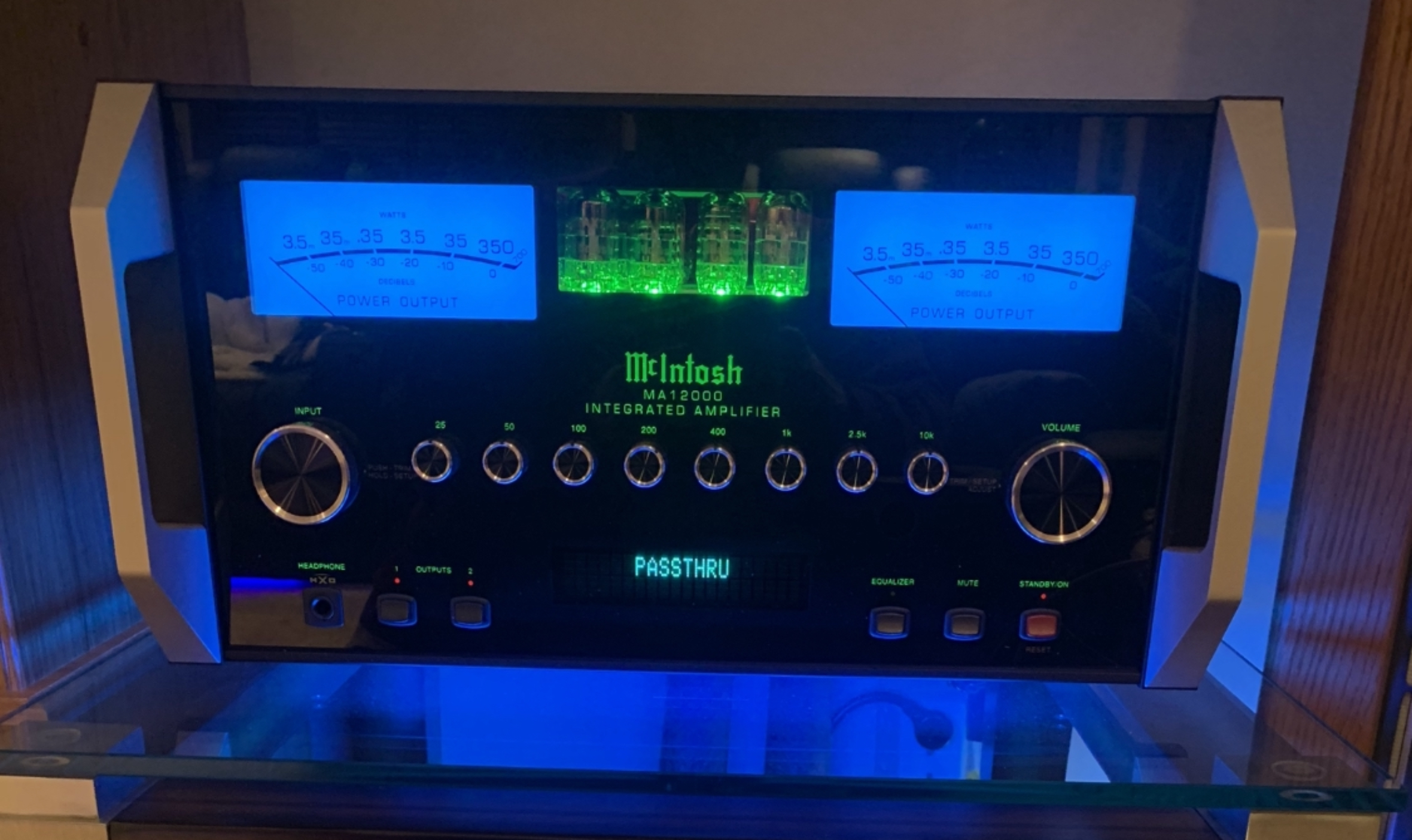
MA12000 350WPC Hybrid Tube Solid State Integrated Amplifier

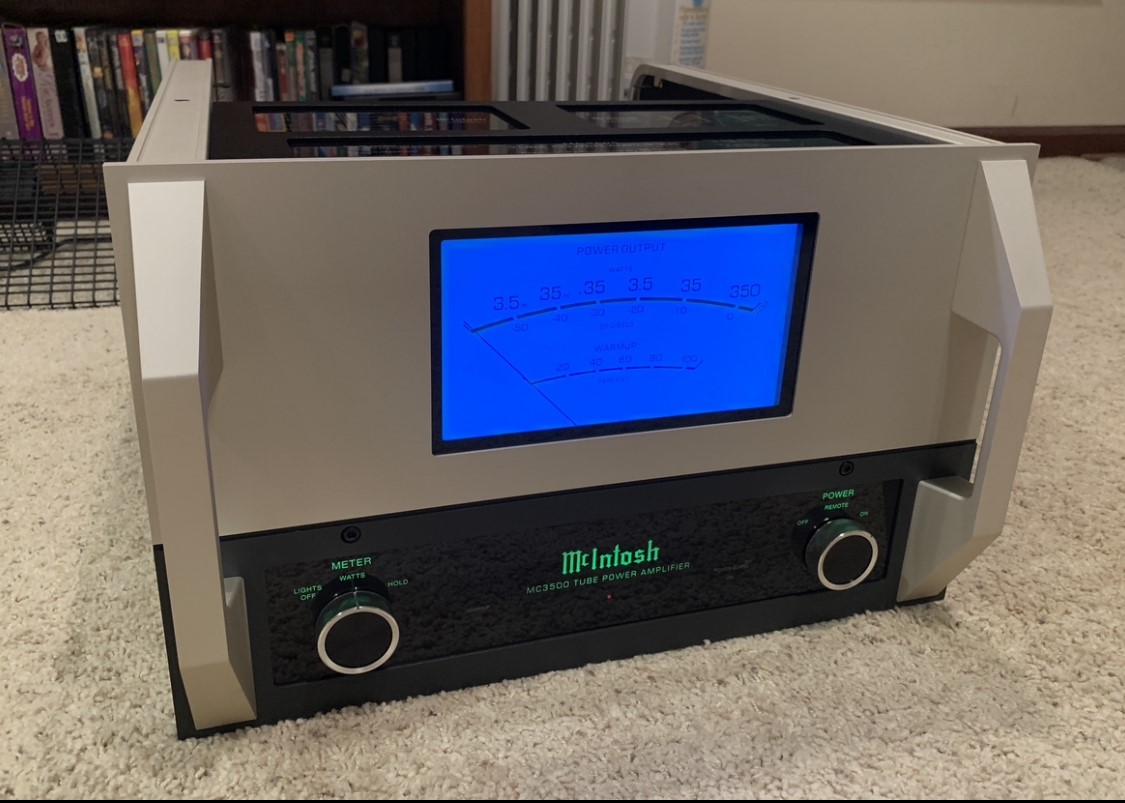
Woodstock 50th Anniversary MC3500 MkII Tube Mono block Amp

=== Naming Conventions ===
Prefix	Typical product category	Examples
C	Stereo preamplifiers	C22, C32, C53, C12000
CR	Multi-zone preamplifiers / control systems	CR106
D / DS	Digital preamplifiers, DACs and streaming DACs	D100, D150, DS200
MA	Integrated amplifiers	MA252, MA352, MA8950, MA12000
MAC	Receivers combining amplifier, preamplifier and tuner functions	MAC1700, MAC4100, MAC7200
MB	Bluetooth and wireless audio components	MB20, MB25
MC	Power amplifiers	MC240, MC275, MC2300, MC462
MCD	CD and SACD/CD players	MCD350, MCD600, MCD12000
MCT	CD/SACD transports	MCT450, MCT500
MDA	Digital-to-analog converters	MDA200
MEN	Room-correction processors	MEN220
MHA	Headphone amplifiers	MHA100, MHA150, MHA200
MHT	Home-theater receivers	MHT100, MHT200, MHT300
MI	Multi-channel and custom-installation power amplifiers	MI128, MI254, MI347, MI502
MIP	Power-control products	MIP200
ML	Loudspeakers	ML1
MP	Phono preamplifiers	MP100
MPC	Power controllers	MPC500, MPC1500
MQ	Equalizers and room-acoustic processors	MQ101, MQ107, MQ112
MR	Radio tuners	MR67, MR78, MR89
MS	Music servers and streamers	MS300, MS500
MSA	Streaming integrated amplifiers	MSA5500
MT	Turntables	MT2, MT5, MT10
MTI	Integrated turntable systems	MTI100
MX	Audio/video control centers and surround processors	MX110, MX123, MX200
PS	Powered subwoofers	PS1K, PS2K
RS	Wireless loudspeaker systems	RS100, RS150, RS250
XCS	Center-channel loudspeakers	XCS1.5K
XRT	Floor-standing loudspeaker systems	XRT1.1K, XRT2.1K

=== Selected historical products ===
Year	Model	Product type	Significance
1949	50W-1	Vacuum-tube power amplifier	First McIntosh power amplifier
1950	AE2	Preamplifier / amplifier equalizer	First McIntosh preamplifier
1954	MC30	Vacuum-tube power amplifier	One of the company's early signature power amplifiers
1960	MC240	Vacuum-tube stereo power amplifier	First McIntosh stereo power amplifier
1961	MC275	Vacuum-tube stereo power amplifier	One of McIntosh's best-known amps; originally produced 1961–1971, Mk 2 1993–1995, Mk 3 1995–2003, Mk 4 2004–2007, Mk 5 2007–2012, 50th Anniv Ed. 2012–2015, Mk 6 2012–present.
1963	C22	Vacuum-tube preamplifier	One of McIntosh's best-known preamplifiers
1967	MC2505	Solid-state stereo power amplifier	Among the first McIntosh solid-state power amplifiers and an early solid-state model with the company's characteristic front-panel meters
1968	MC3500	Vacuum-tube monoblock power amplifier	High-power amplifier later used in the sound system at the 1969 Woodstock festival
1970	ML1	Loudspeaker	First McIntosh loudspeaker
1971	MC2300	Solid-state power amplifier	300-watt-per-channel amplifier later used extensively in the Grateful Dead's Wall of Sound
1972	MR78	FM tuner	Widely regarded as one of McIntosh's most notable tuners
1980	XRT20	Loudspeaker	Introduced McIntosh's line-array loudspeaker design
1985	MCD7000	CD player	First McIntosh CD player
2005	MS300	Music server	Early McIntosh digital music server
2007	MT10	Turntable	First McIntosh turntable

=== Selected modern products ===
Year	Model	Product type	Significance
2015	C52	Solid-state preamplifier	Preamplifier incorporating digital inputs and high-resolution digital audio support
2015	MB50	Streaming audio player	Wireless network audio streamer
2017	MC1.25KW	Monoblock power amplifier	1,200-watt Quad Balanced monoblock amplifier
2018	MA252	Hybrid integrated amplifier	Vacuum-tube preamplifier combined with a solid-state power amplifier
2019	MA352	Hybrid integrated amplifier	Higher-powered hybrid integrated amplifier
2020	MA12000	Hybrid integrated amplifier	350-watt-per-channel hybrid integrated amplifier
2020	MX123	A/V processor	Home-theater audio/video processor
2021	MHA200	Headphone amplifier	Vacuum-tube headphone amplifier
2022	MC3500 Mk II	Vacuum-tube monoblock power amplifier	Modern successor to the original MC3500
2023	MC451	Dual-mono power amplifier	Combines vacuum-tube and solid-state amplification in one chassis
2023	ML1 Mk II	Loudspeaker	Modern reinterpretation of McIntosh's first loudspeaker

== McIntosh award highlights ==
Date	Product	Award	Publication / Organization
09/03/2013	D100 Digital Preamplifier	"Highly Recommended" Award	AVForums.com
04/02/2015	MA8000 Integrated Amplifier	"Best Amplifier"	Hi-Fi World
06/05/2015	MA8000 Integrated Amplifier	"High End Stereo Amplifier of the Year"	Lyd & Bilde
11/25/2015	MA5200 Integrated Amplifier	"Diapason d'Or" Award	Diapason
12/09/2015	MC452 Amplifier and C2500 Preamplifier	Sound+Image Award	Sound+Image
02/10/2016	C1100 Preamplifier	"Stereo Sound Grand Prix Award"	Stereo Sound
02/24/2016	MCD550 SACD/CD Player	Product of the Year	HiFi Review
03/03/2016	MC152 Amplifier	"Best Amplifier"	Hi-Fi World
11/22/2016	C22 Vacuum Tube Preamplifier	"Product of the Year"	The Absolute Sound
12/15/2016	RS100 Wireless Speaker	"Diapason d'Or" Hi-Fi Award	Diapason
02/08/2017	MC275 Vacuum Tube Amplifier and C22 Vacuum Tube Preamplifier	"Editor's Choice" Awards	The Absolute Sound
06/02/2017	MCD550 SACD/CD Player	"Outstanding Product Award"	The Speaker Shack
08/02/2017	MT5 Turntable	"Top Quality" Award	Fedeltà del Suono
11/15/2017	MC1.25KW Amplifier and MA9000 Integrated Amplifier	"Grand Prix" Awards	Stereo Sound
11/17/2017	MA8900 Integrated Amplifier	"Diapason d'Or" Award	Diapason
12/11/2017	MA8900 Integrated Amplifier	"Best Stereo Integrated Amplifier"	Secrets of Home Theater & High Fidelity
02/01/2018	MA9000 Integrated Amplifier	"Product of the Year"	SoundStage! Network
07/31/2018	C52 and C47 Preamplifiers	"Golden Ear" Awards	The Absolute Sound
11/09/2018	MA252 Integrated Amplifier	"Diapason d'Or" Award	Diapason
11/13/2018	MC611 Amplifier	"Grand Prix" Award	Stereo Sound
01/23/2019	MA9000 Integrated Amplifier	"Integrated Amplifier Product of the Year"	SoundStage! Network
12/13/2019	MC312 Amplifier	"Best Stereo Power Amplifier of 2019"	Secrets of Home Theater and High Fidelity
01/22/2020	MCD600 SACD/CD Player	"Product of the Year"	Hi-Fi i Muzyka
01/24/2020	MTI100 Integrated Turntable	"Product of the Year 2019"	The Audiophile Apartment
12/01/2020	MA352 Integrated Amplifier	"Best Hybrid Amplifier 2020"	Hi-Fi World
12/10/2020	C53 Stereo Preamplifier	"2020 Best High-End Stereo Preamplifier"	Secrets of Home Theater and High Fidelity
06/08/2021	MA12000 Hybrid Integrated Amplifier	"Applause" Award	StereoNET UK
12/02/2021	MA12000 Hybrid Integrated Amplifier	"Reference" Award	Haute Fidélité
12/08/2021	MHA200 Headphone Amplifier	"Headphone Amplifier of the Year"	HiFi+
12/13/2021	MA12000 Hybrid Integrated Amplifier	"2021 Grand Prix" Award	Stereo Sound
12/22/2022	MC3500 Vacuum Tube Amplifier	"2022 Grand Prix" Award	Stereo Sound
01/04/2023	MC451 Dual Mono Power Amplifier	CES 2023 "Innovation Awards Honoree"	CES
01/17/2023	MA8950 Stereo Amplifier	"Editor's Choice" Award for Best High-End Stereo Amplifier	AVForums
01/26/2023	MHA200 Vacuum Tube Headphone Amplifier	"Editor's Choice" Award for Best High-End Hi-Fi Product 2022	AVForums
03/23/2023	MX123 and MC257	Best Home Theater A/V Processor and Amplifier	Robb Report
05/14/2023	C12000 Preamplifier and MC3500 Mk II Vacuum Tube Amplifier	Stereo Pre-Power Amplifiers of the Year	What Hi-Fi?

== Competition and value ==
In the all-tube receiver-amplifier category of the 1970s, competition in audio products for McIntosh came from Dynaco, Fisher Electronics, H.H. Scott, Inc., Sherwood (company), Marantz, Luxman, Sansui Electric, Audio Research, Sequerra, Harman Kardon, and Phase Linear (transistor).

During the 80's through mid 2000's products from Bob Carver, Sunfire, Conrad Johnston, Mark Levinson Audio Systems, Technics (brand), Akai, Accuphase, Pioneer Elite, NAD Electronics, Audio Research, Adcom, Bang & Olufsen, Scientific Audio Electronics (SAE), Yamaha, Onkyo, Marantz, Denon, Harman Kardon, and Sony ES series were competitive.

Modern-day audio products that compete with McIntosh include Mark Levinson, PS Audio, Audio Research, Manley Laboratories, Wilson Audio, and Dan D'agostino.

McIntosh is considered to be at the high-end of the audio industry by historical audio collectors and modern day audio enthusiasts, when measured by marketplace prices, due to their reputation, general reliability, and resale value.

== Car audio ==
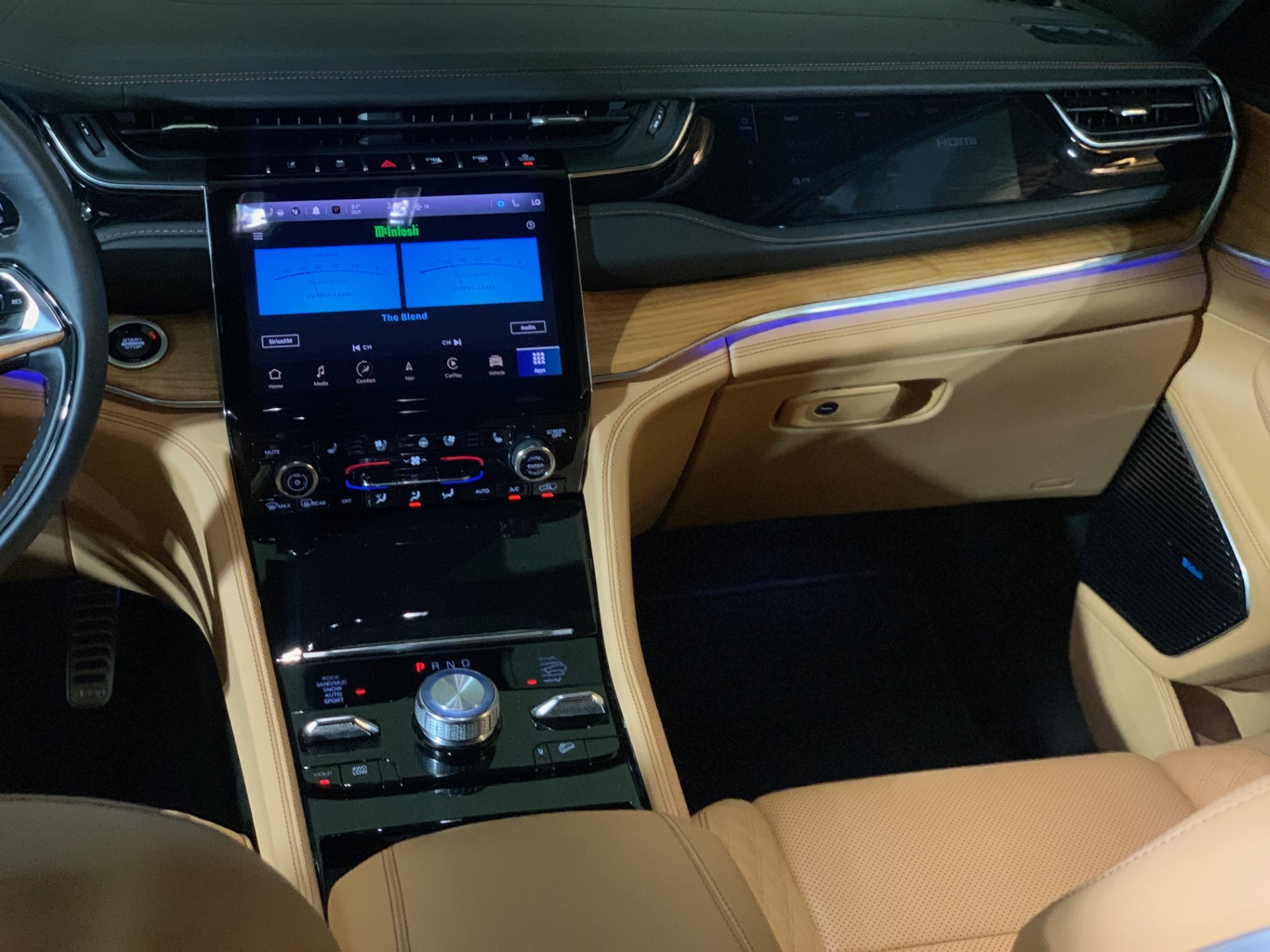
Mcintosh MX 950 Reference sound system shown in a 2023 Jeep Grand Cherokee L Summit Reserve model..19 speakers 950 watts with 10" subwoofer

In the late 90's and early 2000's, a few vehicles were available from the factory with McIntosh sound systems, including BMW, Subaru Legacy and Outback models (starting from the BH & BE Legacy chassis) as well as the 100th Anniversary 2005–2006 Ford GT. Past production vehicles included a CD changer, CD changer/AM/FM controller, and an external DAC. Unique features such as the Fast Responding Wattmeter and the patented Power Guard circuitry set their amplifiers apart from others' products; various models were available offering from 75 to 2,000 watts, divided amongst one to six channels. High quality power supplies, powerful circuit topologies, and balanced inputs completed each amplifier. At the end of the chain used to lie their hand-built drivers, which came in standard 5 1/4-inch and 6 1/2-inch nominal sizes. All applicable car products were finished with McIntosh's signature glass plate displays.

On September 3, 2020, McIntosh's first ever automotive Reference system was recently announced by Jeep with its return to American luxury SUVs with the Grand Wagoneer concept. The McIntosh MX1375 Reference Entertainment System and MX950 Entertainment System are available as factory-installed systems in the Jeep Wagoneer, Grand Wagoneer, and Jeep Grand Cherokee respectively, starting with the 2022 model year. McIntosh is offered as an upgrade in certain models of the Jeep Grand Cherokee L (three row SUV WL platform) starting with the 2021 model year (one year earlier than the Wagoneer or GC model debut)

== Marine audio ==
McIntosh recently collaborated with Wally Yachts of Milan Italy to offer an historic milestone at the company. It marks the first time McIntosh systems have been used in a marine environment.
