= World of McIntosh Experience Center =

- Founded: 2015
- Headquarters: New York City
- Website: worldofmcintosh.com

World of McIntosh Experience Center occupied a five-story townhouse at 214 Lafayette Street in SoHo, Manhattan, from 2015-2021 in New York City. The 12,000 square foot townhome opened on October 13, 2015, on the site of a former power station. The CEO is Jeff Poggi and Charlie Randall. World of McIntosh is owned by McIntosh Group based in New York.

World of McIntosh serves as an appointment-only retail showroom for McIntosh Group's audio equipment, including Audio Research, McIntosh Laboratory, Sonus Faber, and Sumiko. It is used as event space for live music performances, movie screenings, art exhibits, and speeches and presentations. Clients include Google, Microsoft, and Bremont.

World of McIntosh was used as the site of fsociety's new headquarters in the second season of the television show Mr. Robot, and the season 2 finale of Luke Cage as Rosalie Carbone's townhouse. It was also the site of Beyoncé's 2008 music video "Halo", Justin Theroux's apartment in The Other Two, and Law & Order: Special Victims Unit featured this site on at least two episodes; Season 18 Episode 6, Broken Rhymes, as the business office of Vincent Love at 49 Spring Street, played by guest star Wyclef Jean and Season 15 Episode 5, Wonderland Story, as the apartment where the victim’s friend is house-sitting, 209 Lafayette Street, guest starring Finn Wittrock.
