= Virtue Audio =

Virtue Audio was a manufacturer of integrated amplifiers based on the Tripath microprocessor chip, also known as a, class-T, class D or switching amplifier. The company produces unusually small, brightly colored, value-priced amplifiers that produce higher wattage than normally found at their price. Design consultants include Roger Sheker, chief engineer for high-end audio company Audience, maker of the Auricap capacitor.

== Principals ==
Virtue Audio was founded in 2005 by Seth Krinsky. Krinsky is said to have purchased thousands of dollars' worth of Tripath chips as the chip-maker was entering bankruptcy, even before he had an amplifier designed for them. Engineer Michael Mardis performed initial design work on the Virtue amplifiers and rejoined the company in 2009. Sheker joined the project after Virtue sourced caps and wire from Audience.

== Products ==
The company's core products are the Virtue One and Virtue Two integrated digital amplifiers. The two amps are built in the same aluminum case, with the only visible difference being the red front badge on the One and a silver badge on the Two. Inside, the more expensive Virtue Two includes upgraded Auricap input capacitors, a higher output chip, larger power caps and copper binding posts and ships with a larger power supply. The Virtue One uses Tripath TC2000/ bridges TP2051 chips while the more powerful Virtue Two relies on Apogee DDX2200 series power chips.

The Virtue amps were launched at the Rocky Mountain Audio Fest in Denver, Colorado in October 2008. The company's first product, the Virtue One, shipped November, 2008. Initially called the Audiophile.ONE and Audiophile.TWO, the names were changed due to possible trademark issues with another audio product. The rear of both units include a single set of left and right speaker terminals, as well as a single set of left and right RCA inputs and a buffered subwoofer output and power source input. The face includes a proportionally large chrome volume knob and a push in power button. The Virtue One ships standard with a 24volt, 65 watt regulated switching power supply, which is said to produce 30 watts per channel. The Virtue Two ships with a 30 volt, 90 watt unit producing 50 watts per channel. The 30v, 90 power supply produces 45 watts per channel from the Virtue One as an upgrade. A 30 volt, 130 watt power supply is also offered as an upgrade to both units producing 60 watts per channel.

Competitors in the value-priced end of the market include NuForce Icon, Trends TA-10, and the Winsome Labs Mouse, while Red Wine Audio, Audio Research and Bel Canto are high-end competitors running similar chipsets.
