= Class-T amplifier =

Electronic audio amplifier

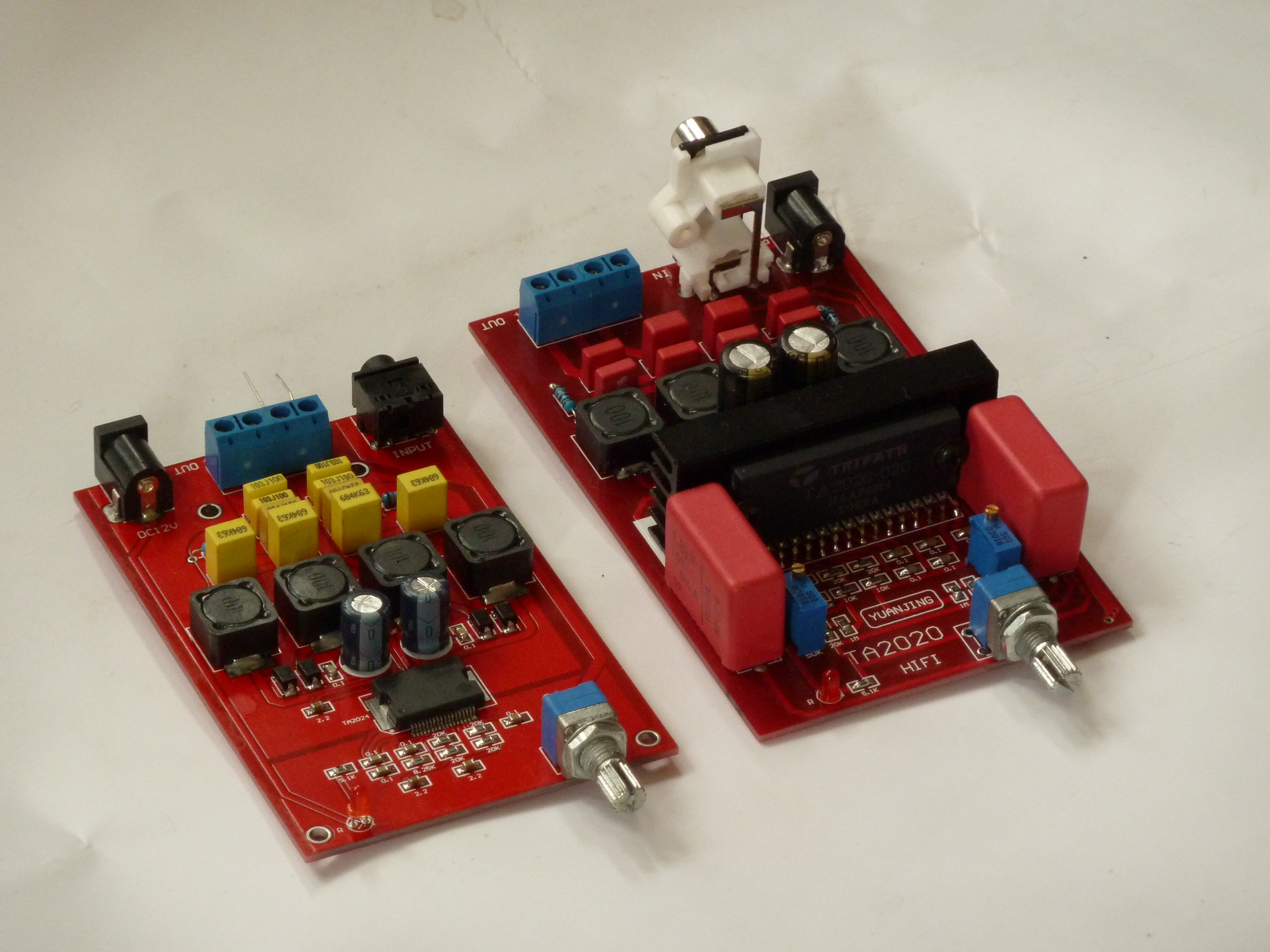
Two Tripath chipset Class T stereo amplifier modules. TA2024 6+6W to the left, TA2020 20+20W to the right

Class T was a registered trademark for a switching (class-D) audio amplifier, used for Tripath's amplifier technologies (patent filed on Jun 20, 1996). Similar designs have now been widely adopted by different manufacturers.

== Amplifier ==
The covered products use a class-D amplifier combined with proprietary techniques to control the pulse-width modulation to produce what is claimed to be better performance than other class-D amplifier designs. Among the publicly disclosed differences is real time control of the switching frequency depending on the input signal and amplified output. One of the amplifiers, the TA2020, was named one of the twenty-five chips that 'shook the world" by the IEEE Spectrum magazine.

The control signals in Class T amplifiers may be computed using digital signal processing or fully analog techniques. Currently available implementations use a loop similar to a higher order Delta-Sigma (ΔΣ) (or sigma-delta) modulator, with an internal digital clock to control the sample comparator. The two key aspects of this topology are that (1), feedback is taken directly from the switching node rather than the filtered output, and (2), the higher order loop provides much higher loop gain at high audio frequencies than would be possible in a conventional single pole amplifier.

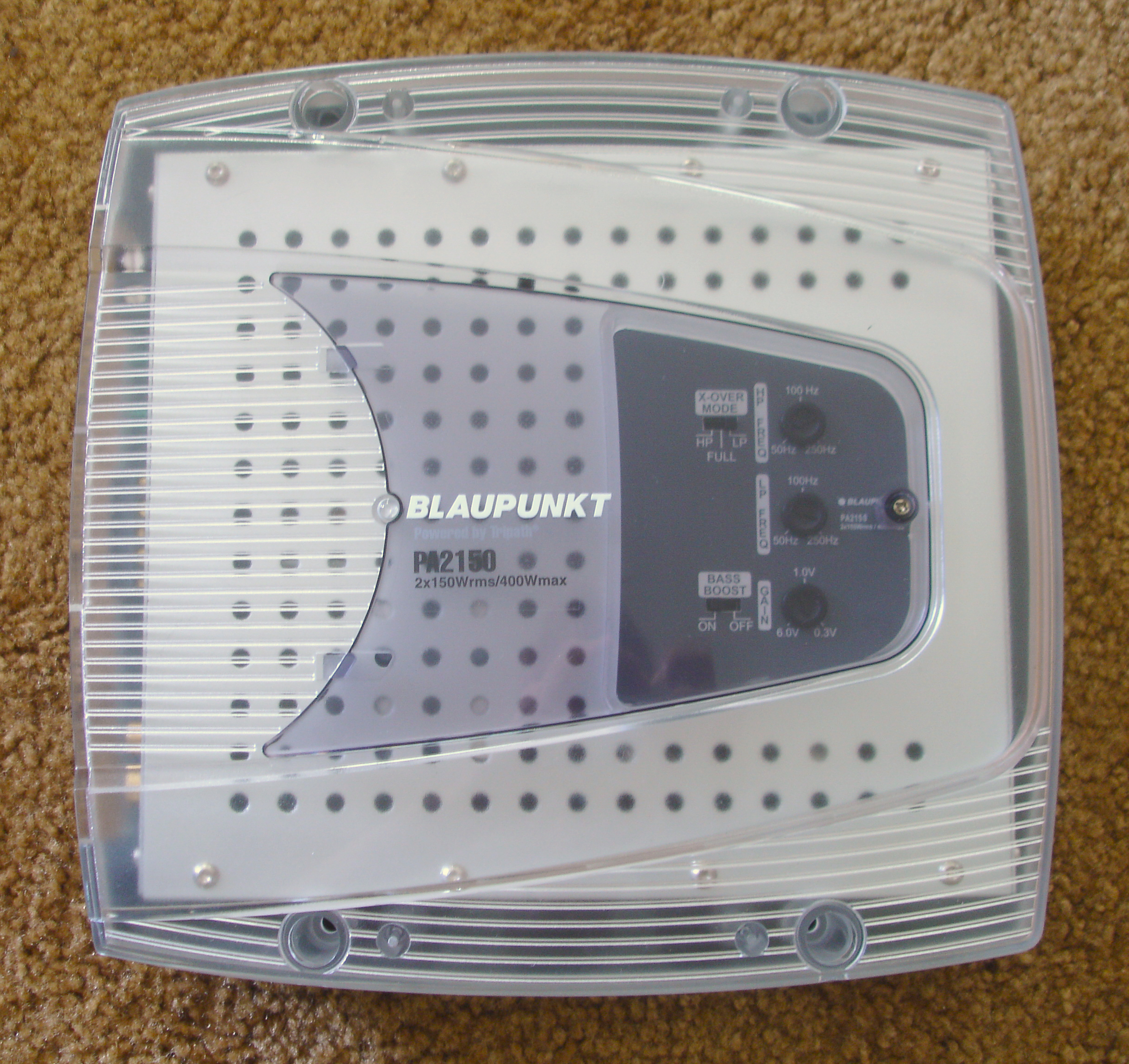
Blaupunkt PA2150 T-Amp, "Powered by Tripath"

Financial difficulties caused Tripath to file for Chapter 11 bankruptcy protection on 8 February 2007. Tripath's stock and intellectual property were purchased later that year by Cirrus Logic.

== Products and applications ==
Tripath used to sell the amplifiers as chips, or as chipsets, to be integrated into products by other companies in several countries. For example:

- Sony, Panasonic and Blaupunkt use them in several car stereos and integrated home cinema systems
- Apple Computer used them in their Power Mac G4 Cube, Power Mac G4 (Digital audio), eMac and iMac (Flat Panel) computers
- Audio Research, an audio electronics company, formerly an exclusive tube circuit specialist, produced a Tripath-based audiophile amplifier.
- Virtue Audio used them in their ONE, TWO, and Sensation range of amplifiers from around 2008–2014.
