= Franco Serblin =

Italian entrepreneur

Franco Serblin (born Gianfranco Serblin; c. 1939 - 31 March 2013) was an Italian entrepreneur and designer, known for founding Sonus Faber and popularising the smooth form which is imitated by many designers today.

== Biography ==
Gianfranco "Franco" Serblin was born sometime in 1939, the son of Ivan Srblin, a navy soldier born in "St. Peter in the Woods" in present-day Istria, Croatia, and Antonietta Banovaz, also a Croat from "St. Peter in the Woods". His father changed his surname to "Serblin" after immigrating to Trieste. Franco was born in Vicenza and was the youngest of seven brothers.

Passionate about audio, he decided to do his best to make a high-fidelity and attractive acoustic speaker. Months of practice culminated in 1980, when he built his first acoustic speaker: the "Snail project", of which only ten were made. In the same period, he produced furniture for some Cizek speaker models, in particular the KA-1, KA-18, and KA-20 systems. After this period, the production of them moved from the United States of America to Italy.

On March 14, 1983, Franco founded Sonus Faber, a high-fidelity speaker company. The distinctive aesthetic style of Sonus Faber, a smooth, blur-like form was conceived by Franco. It is imitated today by various loudspeaker manufacturers. In 2006, after 33 years at the business he founded, he left Sonus Faber to pursue more boutique loud speaker design. He devoted himself to the design of Ktêma, a new speaker that was released only five years later. Currently the Ktêma speaker is still in production with Serblin's latest "Agreement" and is being marketed in 18 countries around the world.

He died in Vicenza, aged 73, on March 31, 2013.

== See more ==
Official website, francoserblin.it
