= High fidelity =

High-quality reproduction of sound

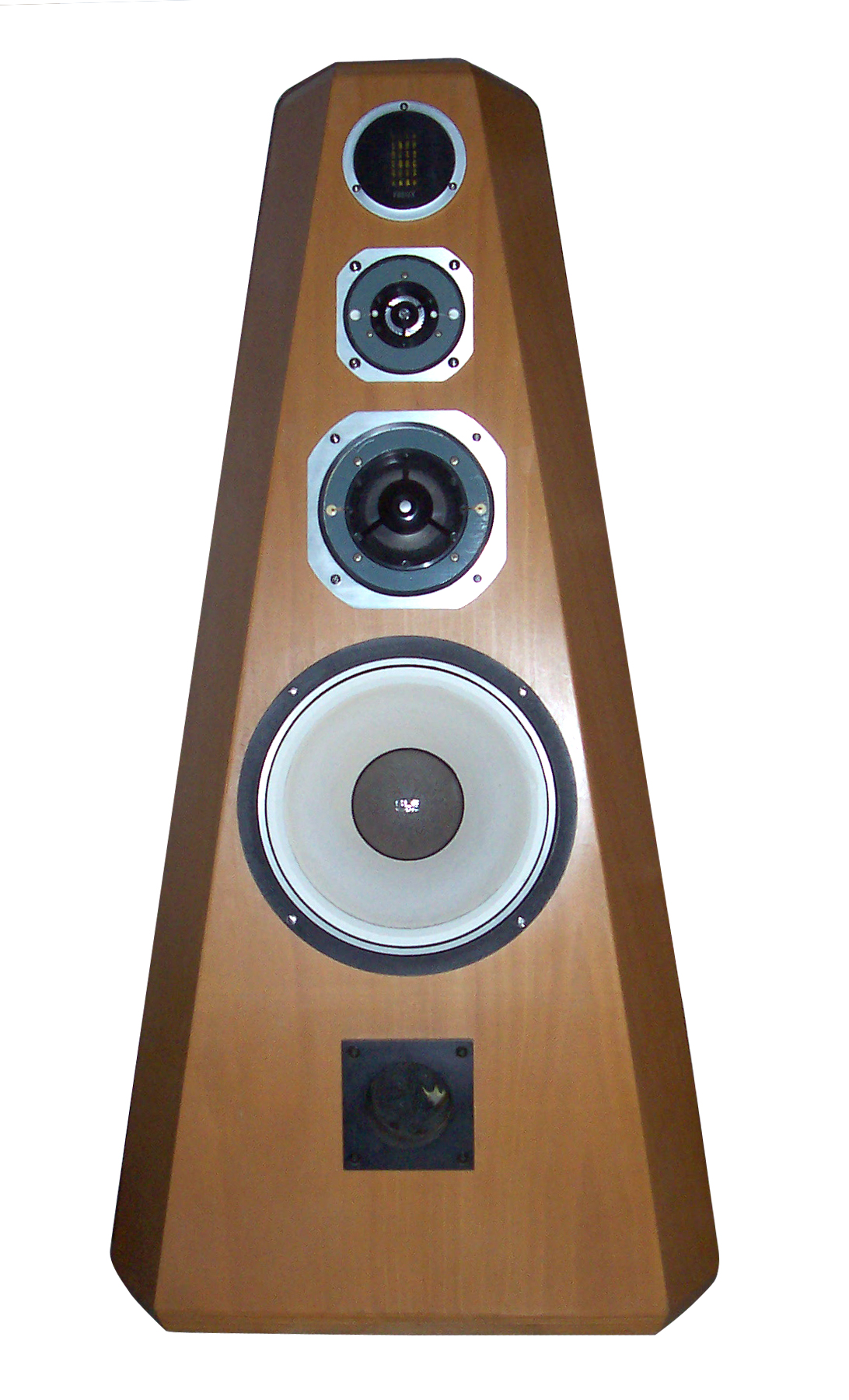
Hi-fi speakers are a key component of quality audio reproduction.

High fidelity (hi-fi or, rarely, HiFi) is the high-quality reproduction of sound. It is popular with audiophiles and home audio enthusiasts. Ideally, high-fidelity equipment has inaudible noise and distortion, and a flat (neutral, uncolored) frequency response within the human hearing range.

High fidelity contrasts with the lower-quality lo-fi sound produced by inexpensive audio equipment, AM radio, or the inferior quality of sound reproduction that can be heard in recordings made until the late 1940s.

== History ==
Bell Laboratories began experimenting with various recording techniques in the early 1930s. Performances by Leopold Stokowski and the Philadelphia Orchestra were recorded in 1931 and 1932 using telephone lines between the Academy of Music in Philadelphia and the Bell Labs in New Jersey. Some multitrack recordings were made on optical sound film, which led to new advances used primarily by MGM (as early as 1937) and Twentieth Century Fox Film Corporation (as early as 1941). RCA Victor began recording performances by several orchestras using optical sound around 1941, resulting in higher-fidelity masters for 78-rpm discs. During the 1930s, Avery Fisher, an amateur violinist, began experimenting with audio design and acoustics. He wanted to make a radio that would sound like he was listening to a live orchestra and achieve high fidelity to the original sound. After World War II, Harry F. Olson conducted an experiment whereby test subjects listened to a live orchestra through a hidden variable acoustic filter. The results proved that listeners preferred high-fidelity reproduction, once the noise and distortion introduced by early sound equipment was removed.

Beginning in 1948, several innovations created the conditions that made major improvements in home audio quality possible:

- Reel-to-reel audio tape recording, based on technology taken from Germany after WWII, helped musical artists such as Bing Crosby make and distribute recordings with better fidelity.
- The advent of the 33 1/3 rpm long play (LP) microgroove vinyl record, with lower surface noise and quantitatively specified equalization curves as well as noise-reduction and dynamic range systems. Classical music fans, who were opinion leaders in the audio market, quickly adopted LPs because, unlike with older records, most classical works would fit on a single LP.
- Higher quality turntables, with more responsive needles
- FM radio, with wider audio bandwidth and less susceptibility to signal interference and fading than AM radio.
- Better amplifier designs, with more attention to frequency response and much higher power output capability, reproducing audio without perceptible distortion.
- New loudspeaker designs, including acoustic suspension, developed by Edgar Villchur and Henry Kloss with improved bass frequency response.

In the 1950s, audio manufacturers employed the phrase high fidelity as a marketing term to describe records and equipment intended to provide faithful sound reproduction. Many consumers found the difference in quality compared to the then-standard AM radios and 78-rpm records readily apparent and bought high-fidelity phonographs and 33 1/3 LPs such as RCA's New Orthophonics and London's FFRR (Full Frequency Range Recording, a UK Decca system). Audiophiles focused on technical characteristics and bought individual components, such as separate turntables, radio tuners, phono stages, preamplifiers, power amplifiers and loudspeakers. Some enthusiasts even assembled their loudspeaker systems. With the advent of integrated multi-speaker console systems in the 1950s, hi-fi became a generic term for home sound equipment, to some extent displacing phonograph and record player.

In the late 1950s and early 1960s, the development of stereophonic equipment and recordings led to the next wave of home-audio improvement, and in common parlance stereo displaced hi-fi. Records were now played on a stereo (stereophonic phonograph). In the world of the audiophile, however, the concept of high fidelity continued to refer to the goal of highly accurate sound reproduction and to the technological resources available for approaching that goal. This period is regarded as the "Golden Age of Hi-Fi", when vacuum tube equipment manufacturers of the time produced many models considered superior by modern audiophiles, and just before solid state (transistorized) equipment was introduced to the market, subsequently replacing tube equipment as the mainstream technology.

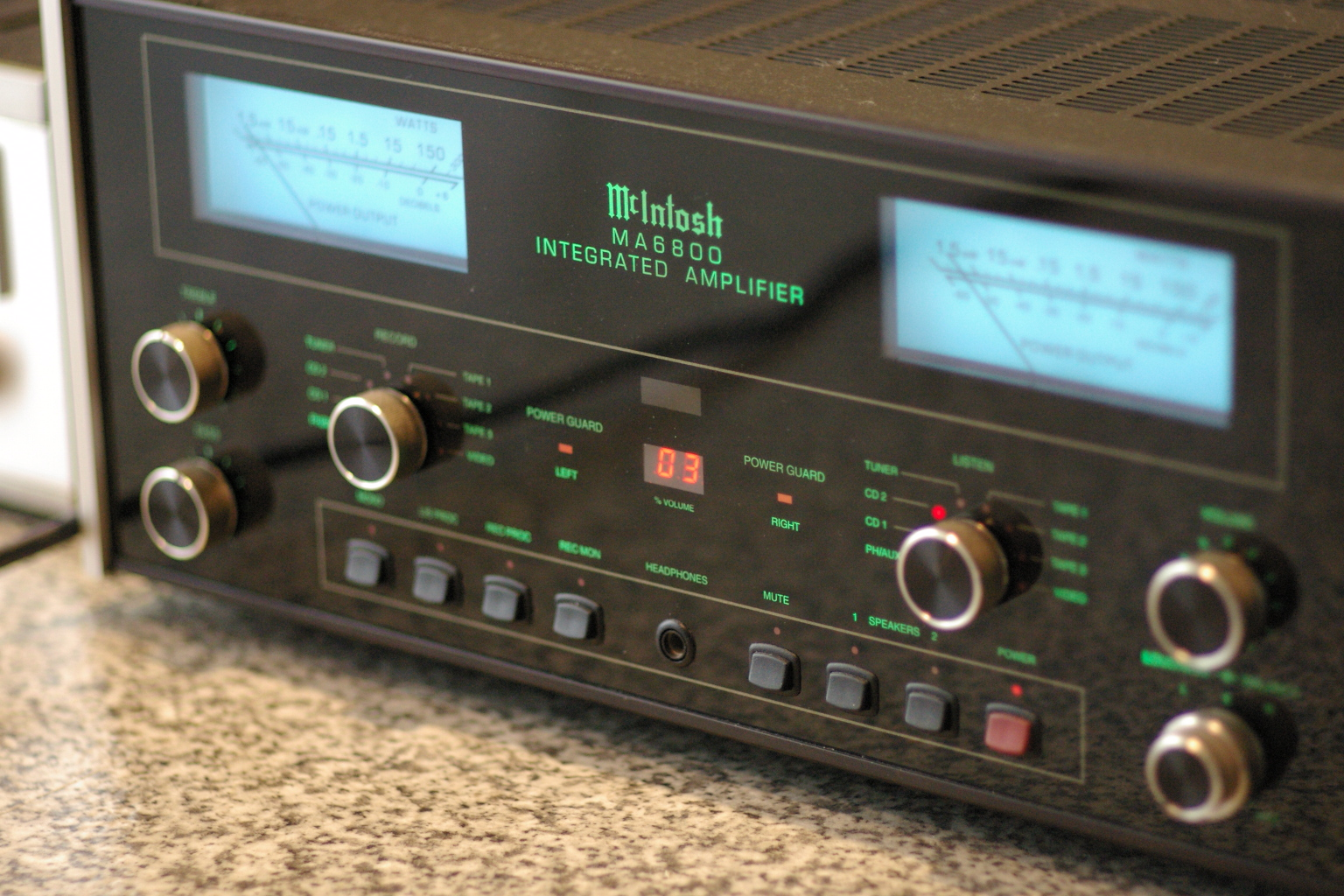
An integrated amplifier combines an audio preamplifier and power amplifier into one unit, and is an example of the "component" approach to assembling a comprehensive sound reproduction system.

In the 1960s, the FTC, with the help of the audio manufacturers, came up with a definition to identify high-fidelity equipment so that the manufacturers can clearly state if they meet the requirements and reduce misleading advertisements.

A popular type of system for reproducing music beginning in the 1970s was the integrated music centre—which combined a phonograph turntable, AM-FM radio tuner, tape player, preamplifier, and power amplifier in one package, often sold with its own separate, detachable or integrated speakers. These systems advertised their simplicity. The consumer did not have to select and assemble individual components or be familiar with impedance and power ratings. Purists generally avoid referring to these systems as high fidelity, though some are capable of very good quality sound reproduction.

Audiophiles in the 1970s and 1980s preferred to buy each component separately. That way, they could choose models of each component with the specifications that they desired. In the 1980s, several audiophile magazines became available, offering reviews of components and articles on how to choose and test speakers, amplifiers, and other components.

== Listening tests ==
Listening tests are used by hi-fi manufacturers, audiophile magazines, and audio engineering researchers and scientists. If the listener can see the components being tested, then it is possible that their pre-existing biases towards or against certain components or brands could affect their judgment. To respond to this issue, researchers began to use blind tests, in which listeners cannot see the components being tested. A commonly used variant of this test is the ABX test. A subject is presented with two known samples (sample A, the reference, and sample B, an alternative), and one unknown sample X, for a total of three samples. X is randomly selected from A and B, and the subject identifies X as being either A or B. ABX testing can only show that there is a difference between A and B, not whether one is better than the other, and if the test fails to reveal a difference, that doesn't necessarily imply that there is none.

Blind tests are sometimes used as part of attempts to ascertain whether certain audio components (such as expensive, exotic cables) have any subjectively perceivable effect on sound quality. Data gleaned from these blind tests is not accepted by some audiophile magazines such as Stereophile and The Absolute Sound in their evaluations of audio equipment. John Atkinson, then editor of Stereophile, stated in 2005 that he once purchased a solid-state amplifier, the Quad 405, in 1978 after seeing the results from blind tests, but came to realize, months later, that "the magic was gone" until he replaced it with a tube amp. Robert Harley of The Absolute Sound wrote, in 2008, that: "...blind listening tests fundamentally distort the listening process and are worthless in determining the audibility of a certain phenomenon."

Doug Schneider, editor of the online Soundstage network, argued the opposite in 2009. He stated: "Blind tests are at the core of the decades' worth of research into loudspeaker design done at Canada's National Research Council (NRC). The NRC researchers knew that for their result to be credible within the scientific community and to have the most meaningful results, they had to eliminate bias, and blind testing was the only way to do so." Many Canadian companies such as Axiom, Energy, Mirage, Paradigm, PSB, and Revel use blind testing extensively in designing their loudspeakers. Audio professional Sean Olive of Harman International shares this view.

== Semblance of realism ==
Stereophonic sound provided a partial solution to the problem of reproducing the sound of live orchestral performers by creating separation among instruments, the illusion of space, and a phantom central channel. An attempt to enhance reverberation was tried in the 1970s through quadraphonic sound. Consumers did not want to pay the additional costs and space required for the marginal improvements in realism. With the rise in popularity of home theater, however, multi-channel playback systems became popular, and many consumers were willing to accommodate the six to eight channels required in a home theater.

In addition to spatial realism, the playback of music must be subjectively free from noise, such as hiss or hum, to achieve realism. The compact disc (CD) provides about 90 decibels of dynamic range, which exceeds the 80 dB dynamic range of music as normally perceived in a concert hall. Audio equipment must be able to reproduce frequencies high enough and low enough to be realistic. The human hearing range, for healthy young persons, is 20 Hz to 20,000 Hz. Most adults can't hear higher than 15,000 Hz. CDs can theoretically encode frequencies from 0 Hz up to almost 22,050 Hz, but both production and playback equipment further limit that range. The system was designed so that it can economically reproduce the full 20 Hz to 20,000 Hz frequency range, the range that most humans can hear. The equipment must also provide no noticeable distortion of the signal or emphasis or de-emphasis of any frequency in this frequency range.

== Modularity ==
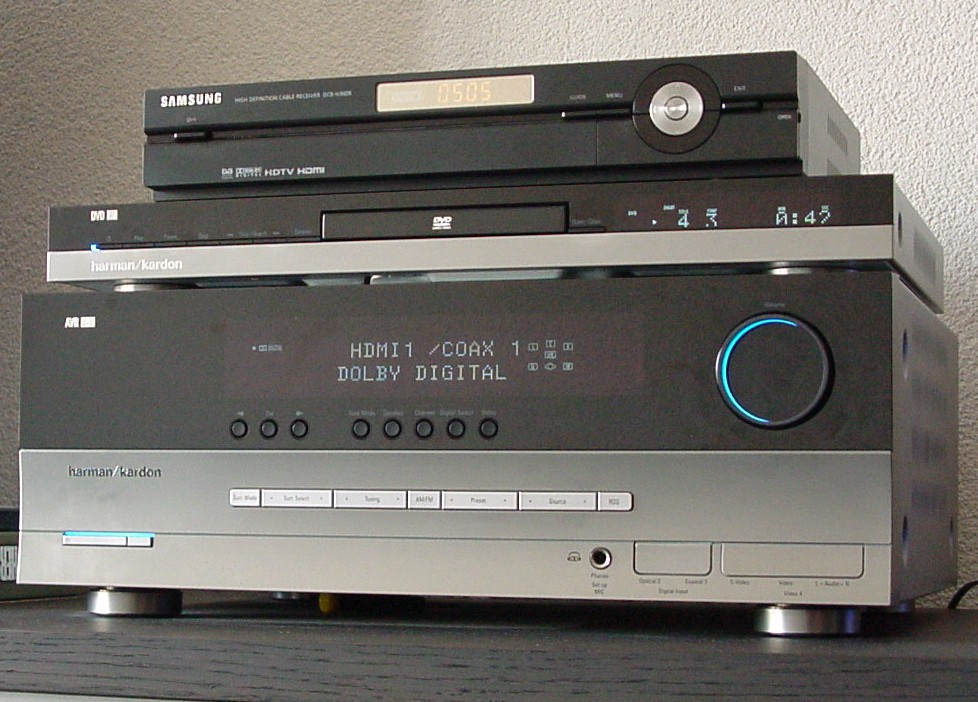
Modular components made by Samsung and Harman Kardon, (from the bottom) an audio digital receiver, DVD player, and HD TV receiver

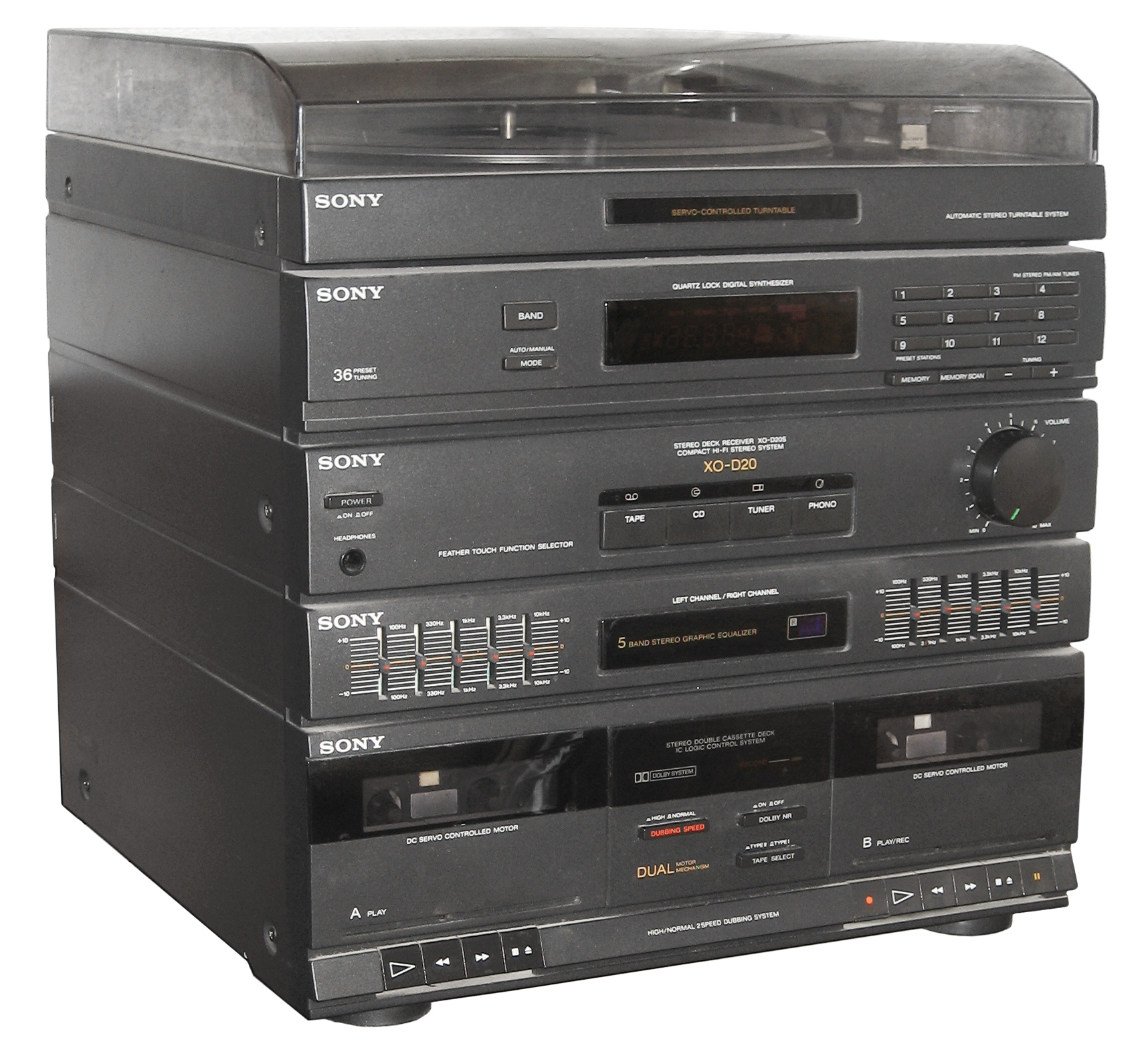
A Sony "midi" hi-fi from the late 1980s. Despite its appearance mimicking separate components, this is an all-in-one unit featuring a record player, a dual cassette tape deck, a digital tuner, and an amplifier with an integrated equalizer. Other midi systems integrating a CD player were also increasingly common by this point.

Integrated, mini, or lifestyle systems (also known by the older terms music centre or midi system) contain one or more sources such as a CD player, a tuner, or a cassette tape deck together with a preamplifier and a power amplifier in one box. A limitation of an "integrated" system is that failure of any one component can possibly lead to the need to replace the entire unit, as components are not readily swapped in or out of a system merely by plugging and unplugging cables, and may not even have been made available by the manufacturer to allow piecemeal repairs.

Although some high-end audio manufacturers do produce integrated systems, such products are generally disparaged by audiophiles, who prefer to build a system from separates (or components), often with each item from a different manufacturer specialising in a particular component. This provides the most flexibility for piece-by-piece upgrades and repairs.

A preamplifier and a power amplifier in one box is called an integrated amplifier; with a tuner added, it is a receiver. A monophonic power amplifier is called a monoblock. Other modules in the system may include components like cartridges, tonearms, hi-fi turntables, digital media players, DVD players that play a wide variety of discs including CDs, CD recorders, MiniDisc recorders, hi-fi videocassette recorders (VCRs) and reel-to-reel tape recorders. Signal modification equipment can include equalizers and noise-reduction systems.

This modularity allows the enthusiast to spend as little or as much as they want on a component to suit their specific needs, achieve a desired sound, and add components as desired. Also, failure of any component of an integrated system can render it unusable, while the unaffected components of a modular system may continue to function. A modular system introduces the complexity of cabling multiple components and often having different remote controls for each unit.

== Modern equipment ==
Some modern hi-fi equipment can be digitally connected using TOSLINK or S/PDIF cables, USB ports (including one to play digital audio files, or act as a sound card), HDMI, Bluetooth or Wi-Fi support.

Another modern component is the music server consisting of one or more computer hard drives that hold music in the form of computer files. When the music is stored in an audio file format that is lossless, such as FLAC, the computer playback of recorded audio can serve as an audiophile-quality source for a hi-fi system. There is now a push from certain streaming services to offer hi-fi services.

Streaming services typically have a modified dynamic range and possibly bit rates lower than audiophile standards. Tidal and others have launched a hi-fi tier that includes access to FLAC and Master Quality Authenticated studio masters for many tracks through the desktop version of the player. This integration is also available for high-end audio systems.

== See also ==
- Audio system measurements
- Comparison of analog and digital recording
- DIY audio
- Edwin Howard Armstrong
- Entertainment center
- Lo-fi music
- VHS § Hi-Fi audio system
- Wife acceptance factor
- Wi-Fi, a Wireless term derived from hi-fi
