= Integrated amplifier =

Power amplifier with integrated preamps

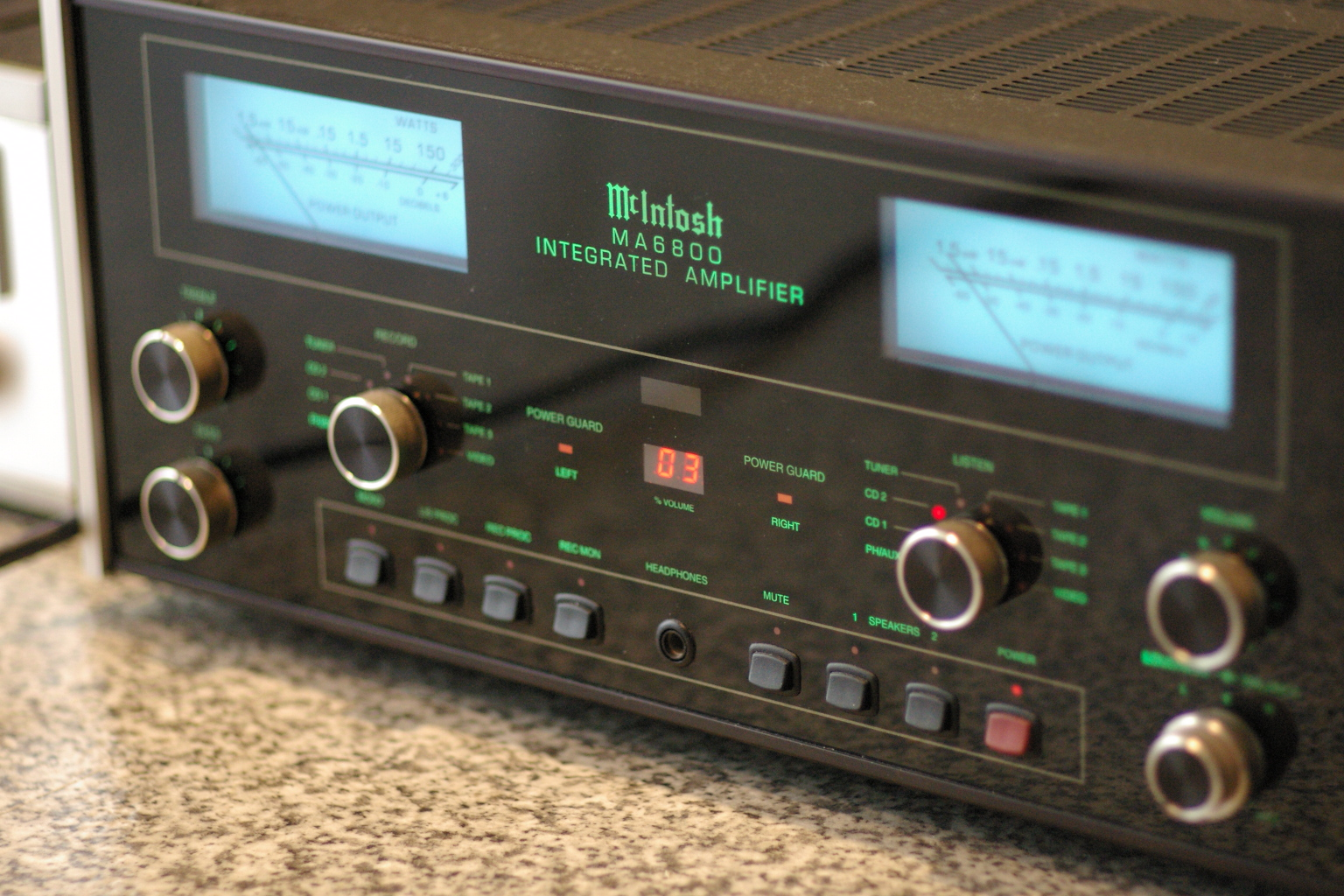
McIntosh MA6800 integrated amplifier

An integrated amplifier (pre/main amp) is an electronic device containing an audio preamplifier and power amplifier in one unit, as opposed to separating the two. Most modern audio amplifiers are integrated and have several inputs for devices such as CD players, DVD players, and auxiliary sources.

Vintage integrated amplifiers commonly have dedicated inputs for phonograph, tuner, tape recorder and an auxiliary input. Except for the phono input, all of the inputs are line level, thus, they are interchangeable. The phono stage provides RIAA equalization.

== See also ==
- Audiophile
- High-end audio
- High fidelity
- Valve audio amplifier

== Sources ==
1. Queen's University ENPH333 Notes- Prof. J.L. Mason
