= Phono stage =

Amplifies the signal from a turntable

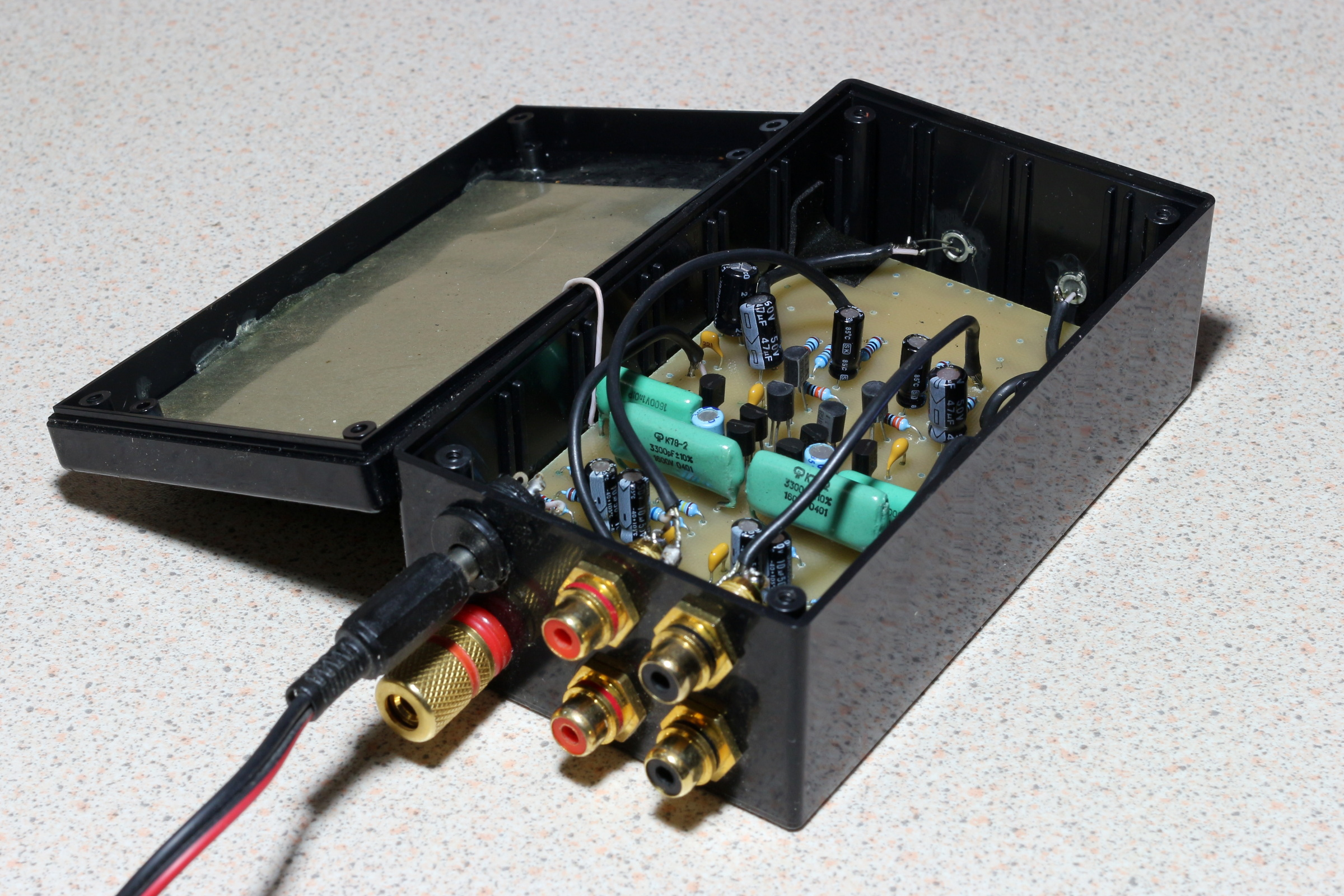
A DIY (or, perhaps, home made for sale) RIAA phono stage made in Russia in early 2000s

A phono stage, also known as a phono amplifier or phono preamplifier, is an electronic audio component that amplifies the signal from a turntable to a level that will allow it to be heard when connected to a sound system. A phono stage is needed to listen to any turntable otherwise the sound will be too low when heard through speakers or headphones. The phono stage can be a separate device that connects to the record player or it can be included as part of another audio component like a preamplifier or integrated amplifier. They can also be built into the record player itself.

== Description ==
When the magnetic cartridge from a turntable touches a vinyl record, it produces a signal called a "phono signal". In order for the signal to be properly heard through an audio system, it needs to be converted into a "line signal", otherwise the sound would be too low. The bass notes from a signal are increased while the treble is decreased in a process called RIAA equalization. This balance is due to the way the record was pressed in order to compensate for the sound and is done to create a balanced listening experience.

There are 2 types of phono stages:

- Tube phono stage - produces even order harmonic distortion
- Solid state phono stage - produces odd order harmonic distortion

Tube phono stages were the original way that phono stages were built. The advancements in technology soon led to the transition to solid state builds. In recent years, companies have started to re-release tube versions of phono stages alongside modern solid state phono stages due to the demand and appeal of their different sounds.

Tube and solid state are two methods of building a phono stage that will power the device to amplify the sound but on top of that, a phono stage also has to be built to work with the type of cartridge that the turntable will utilize. There are 2 types of cartridges that a phono stage has to work with: Moving Magnet (MM) cartridge and Moving Coil (MC) cartridge. Moving Coil cartridges for example offer a weaker signal in comparison so a phono stage will need to be powerful enough to properly amplify the signal.

== See also ==
- High fidelity
- High-end audio
- Integrated amplifier
- Preamplifier
