= Accuphase =

Japanese audio equipment company

Accuphase Laboratory, Inc.
- Native name: アキュフェーズ株式会社
- Company type: Private company
- Industry: Electronics
- Founded: June 1, 1972 (Kensonic)
- Founder: Jiro Kasuga
- Headquarters: Yokohama, Japan
- Products: High-end audio
- Website: www.accuphase.com
- Footnotes / references As of February 2014

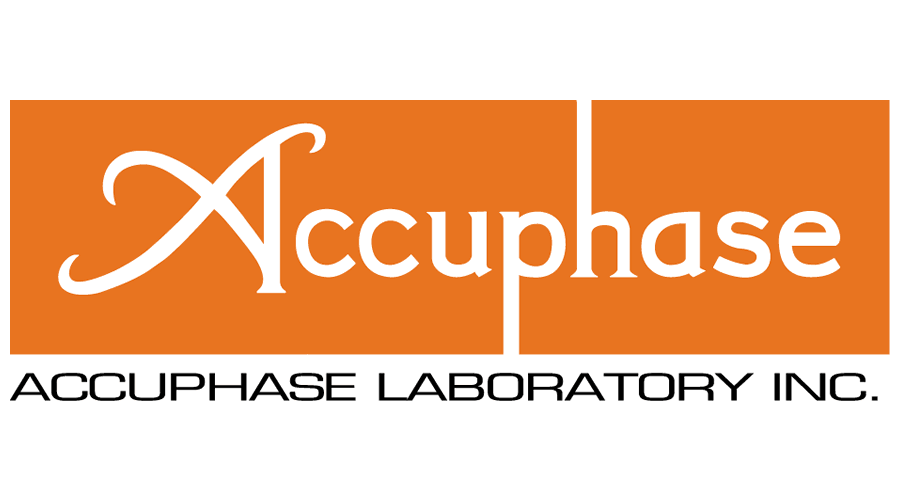
Accuphase Logo

Accuphase Laboratory, Inc. (originally known as Kensonic Laboratory, Inc.) is a Japanese, Yokohama-based high-end audio equipment manufacturer whose philosophy is to "enrich life through technology". Accuphase amplifiers, digital sources and tuners are well regarded for their sound, design and build by high-end audio enthusiasts throughout the world.

Accuphase was founded by former Kenwood engineer Jiro Kasuga in late 1972. Kasuga was not happy with the views of Kenwood relating to the follower of their High-End Supreme 1 unit (1967). He hired some engineers from other prominent brands (Marantz, Luxman) and started Kensonic, with Kenwood as a part owner. Some other connections in the early years of Accuphase exist as well. If the parts used by Kenwood and Kensonic throughout the latter's early years are compared to each other, the similarities are easily noticeable: knobs, buttons, tuner dials and the general direction of the design. Accuphase's early PCBs are tagged KENSONIC, too, and the early units bore KENSONIC on their frontplates as well. Until the mid-1990s, Kenwood still owned part of Kensonic. It appears that Accuphase engineers may have had a hand in the engineering of Kenwood's last high-end series (L-A1, L-D1 and LVD-Z1). For example, the Accuphase E-405 and Kenwood L-A1 have very similar volume knobs, side panels, and remotes.

Kensonic's first products were the P-300 amp(lifier), the C-200 preamp, and the T-100 tuner. The E-202 integrated amp and an up-versioned tuner (the T-101) were added soon after. All received very positive reviews in 1973 and 1974. While Kenwood has now abandoned all high-end audio activities, Kensonic carries on with the Accuphase series.

Accuphase products are readily identified by their large champagne/gold colored faceplates and large dual analog power meters – which are similar to the respected McIntosh Laboratory brand (McIntosh is famous for its unique faceplates, which are made of silk-screened glass and use large blue analog power meters).

Accuphase explains the brand name as follows:

The name ACCUPHASE was adapted by taking the prefix ACCU from the word "accurate", and combining it with PHASE which is a most important factor in audio technology.....it is a very fitting brand name to describe our products that fully portray this and other important characteristics, which penetrate the innermost depth of audio technology.

— Accuphase website

Models remain available at least for several years, and sometimes up to a decade and Accuphase has a reputation for reliability, with units from the first series still in use.

The Accuphase website explains the background and development of each of their products.
