= Sonus Faber =

Italian audio equipment manufacturer

Sonus faber
- Type: Corporation
- Industry: Electronics
- Founded: 1983; 43 years ago
- Founder: Franco Serblin
- Headquarters: Arcugnano, Veneto, Italy
- Key people: Jeff Poggi (CEO)
- Products: Audio equipment
- Parent: McIntosh Group
- Website: sonusfaber.com

Sonus faber is an Italian manufacturer of handcrafted speakers, headphones, and other high-end audio equipment based in Arcugnano, Veneto, Italy. The company was founded in 1983 by Franco Serblin. Sonus faber is one of several audio brands owned by McIntosh Group, which also owns McIntosh, Sumiko, and Fine Sounds.

Sonus faber's products include Chameleon T floor-standing tower speakers, Venere floor speakers, Lumina bookshelf speakers, Aida tower speakers, and others. The Aida line of speakers sells for approximately $120,000.

In 2015, Sonus faber introduced its portable headphone range Pryma. There is the Pryma 0/1, which comes with six variations of headbands and seven variations of earcups. In 2016, they released the Pryma Aria, a wireless version of the 0/1.

In 2019, Sonus faber announced the Palladio collection, a brand new range of custom in-wall and in-ceiling speakers for the audiophiles with a desire for a home theatre system.

In 2020, Maserati announced the MC20 would include a Sonus faber audio system. In 2021, the system was given the EISA award for Best In-Car OEM Premium Audio System.

== See also ==
- List of companies of Italy
