= McIntosh Group =

American audio holding company

- Company type: Private
- Industry: Electronics
- Founded: 2007; 19 years ago
- Headquarters: New York, New York, US
- Parent: Bose Corporation
- Subsidiaries: McIntosh Laboratory; Sonus Faber; Fine Sounds Americas; Sumiko Phono Cartridges; Fine Sounds BeneLux; Fine Sounds U.K
- Website: mcintoshgroup.com

McIntosh Group (formerly Fine Sounds Group) is an American holding company specializing in audio equipment and owns the brands McIntosh Laboratory, Sonus Faber, Fine Sounds Americas, Sumiko Phono Cartridges, Fine Sounds BeneLux, and Fine Sounds U.K. They also have a Sonus Faber partnership with Maserati.

== History ==
In 2007, the asset management company Quadrivio SGR – main shareholder of the group – acquired the brand Sonus Faber, an Italian company specializing in high-end loudspeakers. In 2009 Mauro Grange joined the group as CEO of Sonus Faber.

The "buy and build" strategy carried on by Quadrivio resulted in the acquisition of Audio Research in 2008, Sumiko in 2010, Wadia in 2011 and McIntosh Laboratory in 2012, which constitute the holdings of Fine Sounds Group. Through the acquisition of these brands, Fine Sounds Group became a relevant holding company in the sector of high-end audio, with €50 million sales in 2011. The holding company took part in an official event as one unique family for the first time in 2013, with the participation in the Munich High-end Show.

On 9 May 2014, Mauro Grange and Charlie Randall, president of McIntosh Laboratory, Inc., announced their plans for a management buyout of Fine Sounds Group in partnership with LBO France and Yarpa, including a relocation of the Headquarters from Milan to New York.

On 10 August 2016, Fine Sounds Group was officially renamed McIntosh Group. Effective 31 December 2016, Mauro Grange stepped down as Co-CEO of McIntosh Group. Charlie Randall stepped-in as the CEO of McIntosh Group. In July 2017 McIntosh Group appointed Jeff Poggi to co-Chief Executive Officer and Board member.

In September 2020, Audio Research left the McIntosh Group when Audio Research was sold to its former North American Sales Manager, Trent Suggs.

In June 2022, McIntosh group was acquired by Dallas based equity firm, Highlander Partners, as part of their investment portfolio. On November 19, 2024, Highlander Partners announced the sale of McIntosh Group to Bose Corporation.

== Brands ==
- McIntosh Laboratory, founded in 1949. The American producer of high fidelity and home entertainment systems.
- Sonus Faber, founded in 1983, has been producing acoustic speakers for over 40 years.
- Wadia Digital, one of the first companies dedicated to digital audio reproduction. Also Apple iPod and iPhone docking stations.
- Sumiko, North American importer and distributor of audio components and specifically of all the brands of the Fine Sounds portfolio.
- Pryma, Brand name of Sonus Faber headphones made in Italy
- Fine Sounds Americas, importer and distributor of Audio Research and Sonus faber for the Asian market.
- Fine Sounds U.K., importer and distributor of McIntosh, Sonus faber, and Bassocontinuo for the U.K. market.
