= Audio Research =

Audio Product Manufacturer

- Type: Private
- Industry: Electronics
- Founded: 1970; 56 years ago
- Founder: William Z. Johnson
- Headquarters: Maple Grove, Minnesota, U.S.
- Products: Audio equipment
- Website: www.audioresearch.com

Audio Research Corporation ("ARC") is one of the oldest manufacturers of high-end audio equipment still in operation. The company was known to be a pioneer at advancing state-of-the-art audio reproduction in the 1970s, and for re-introducing the vacuum tube as the primary active amplification device. With the help of reviews in audiophile publications such as Stereophile and The Absolute Sound, it solidified its position as a well-respected audio manufacturer. Many industry observers consider the founder, William Zane Johnson, as one of the true originators of the entire concept of high-end audio as it exists today. As audio critic Jonathan Valin put it: “Where would the high end be without William Zane Johnson . . . ?” and “As with so many of my generation, he and his creations are the high end to me – and always will be."

== History ==
The company was founded by William Z. Johnson in 1970 and was originally located in Minneapolis, Minnesota. ARC moved from Plymouth to Maple Grove, MN in August 2018. Johnson began designing custom audio electronics in the early 1950s and was the former owner of Electronic Industries, a specialty audio retail store in Minneapolis until the mid-1960s. Johnson died on December 10, 2011, in Rancho Mirage, California, at the age of 85.

In 2008, ARC was acquired by Fine Sounds SpA, which owned Sonus faber loudspeakers. Fine Sounds acquired several other highly esteemed high-end audio companies, including Sumiko, Wadia, and McIntosh Laboratories. In 2014, Fine Sounds Group was purchased by a group headed by Charles Randall and Mauro Grange. In 2016 the group was renamed McIntosh Group.

In late August 2020, ARC was acquired by TWS Enterprises, LLC, a privately held company owned wholly by Trent Suggs, former North American Sales Manager TWS Enterprises, LLC is a privately owned company created to hold ARC equities; it is not part of a group. The objective for TWS Enterprises is to further enhance brand reputation and to focus on the unique processes that nourish the culture and product innovation at Audio Research.

In June 2023, Audio Research Corporation was acquired by AR Tube Audio Corporation, a privately owned Delaware-based corporation that included Valerio Cora of Acora Acoustics Corporation as a director. The acquisition was approved by a judge following an asset purchase agreement with Lighthouse Management Group. Cora had previously been announced as leading a new independent corporation for the Audio Research brand. Audio Research and Acora Acoustics were described as remaining separate entities, each following its own independent path.
