= VideoWave =

The VideoWave was a television sold by Bose from 2010 until 2015. It consisted of a 46-inch LCD television with an enlarged Bose wave radio attached to its rear surface. Also included was a Lifestyle control center that allowed for connection of additional sources, an Apple iPod docking station, as well as AM/FM radio.

It was claimed that high-frequency aiming of sound (termed "PhaseGuide" by Bose) simulates surround sound and that aiming the six speakers in opposite directions reduces vibration. Shown to the press on September 28, 2010, it went on sale on October 14, 2010. A microphone was included to help tune the system for the room acoustics (termed "AdaptiQ" by Bose), much like many home theatre receivers. The VideoWave was judged to have good audio quality, video quality and features, but was criticized for costing more than an equivalent traditional setup (i.e., using an AV receiver and surround sound speakers).

The final version of the television, the Videowave III, was sold from 2013 until 2015.
