= Wave system =

Wave system can refer to:

- Bose Wave System
  - Bose Acoustic Wave System (AM/FM/CD/AUX/Boselink)
  - Bose Wave Radio (AM/FM/AUX/BoseLink)
  - Bose Wave Music System (AM/FM/CD/AUX/Boselink)

== See also ==
- D-Wave Systems
- The Wave Transit System
