= Bose Corp. v. Consumers Union of United States, Inc. =

Bose v. Consumers Union
- Supreme Court of the United States

Argued November 8, 1983 Decided April 30, 1984
- Full case name: Bose Corp. v. Consumers Union of United States, Inc.
- Citations: 466 U.S. 485 (more) 104 S. Ct. 1949; 80 L. Ed. 2d 502

Case history
- Prior: Judgment for plaintiff, 508 F. Supp. 1249 (D. Mass. 1981); reversed, 692 F.2d 189 (1st Cir. 1982); cert. granted, 461 U.S. 904 (1983).

Holding
- Product disparagement cases that involve First Amendment claims are governed by the "actual malice" standard of New York Times Co. v. Sullivan (1964)

Court membership
- Chief Justice Warren E. Burger Associate Justices William J. Brennan Jr. · Byron White; Thurgood Marshall · Harry Blackmun; Lewis F. Powell Jr. · William Rehnquist; John P. Stevens · Sandra Day O'Connor

Case opinions
- Majority: Stevens, joined by Brennan, Marshall, Blackmun, Powell
- Concurrence: Burger
- Dissent: White
- Dissent: Rehnquist, joined by O'Connor

Laws applied
- U.S. Const. amend. I

Bose Corp. v. Consumers Union of United States, Inc., 466 U.S. 485 (1984), was a product disparagement case ultimately decided by the Supreme Court of the United States. The Court held, on a 6–3 vote, in favor of Consumers Union, the publisher of Consumer Reports magazine, ruling that proof of "actual malice" was necessary in product disparagement cases raising First Amendment issues, as set out by the case of New York Times Co. v. Sullivan (1964). The Court ruled that the First Circuit Court of Appeals had correctly concluded that Bose had not presented proof of actual malice.

The magazine Consumer Reports had published in 1970 a review of an unusual loudspeaker system manufactured by Bose Corporation, called the Bose 901. The review expressed skepticism of the system's quality and recommended that consumers delay purchase until they had investigated for themselves whether the loudspeaker system's unusual attributes would suit them. Bose objected to numerous statements in the article, including the sentences, "Worse, individual instruments heard through the Bose system seemed to grow to gigantic proportions and tended to wander about the room. For instance, a violin appeared to be 10 feet (3.0 m) wide and a piano stretched from wall to wall." Bose demanded a retraction when they learned that Consumer Reports changed what the original reviewer wrote about the speakers in his pre-publication draft, which the magazine refused to do.

== Lower court history ==
The Massachusetts district court had heard testimony from an author of the article that the instruments heard through the 901's speakers tended to wander "along the wall," rather than "about the room," as had been stated in the article; and found that this constituted a publication of a false statement with the knowledge that it was false. It had found Consumers Union liable for damages.

On appeal, Bose had argued that the district court's findings of fact could not be set aside by the appeals court under Federal Rule of Civil Procedure Rule 52(a) unless the findings were "clearly erroneous." The appeals court, however, had agreed with Consumers Union that under the precedent set by New York Times Co. v. Sullivan (1964), the appeals court had to review the entire matter de novo in order to determine whether the false fact was published with "actual malice." As Bose had not presented sufficient evidence of actual malice, the appeals court ruled, the judgment was required to be overturned.

== See also ==
- Suzuki v. Consumers Union
- List of United States Supreme Court cases, volume 466
