= Bose (brand) =

American consumer electronics company

Bose Corporation
- Type: Private
- Industry: Audio electronics
- Founded: 1964; 62 years ago
- Founder: Amar Bose
- Headquarters: Framingham, Massachusetts, U.S.
- Key people: Bob Maresca (Chairman); Lila Snyder (CEO)
- Products: Audio equipment
- Revenue: US$3.2 billion (FY 2021)
- Owner: Massachusetts Institute of Technology
- Number of employees: 7,000 (FY 2021)
- Subsidiaries: FMOD; McIntosh Group; Skullcandy
- Website: www.bose.com

Bose Corporation (/boʊz/) is an American manufacturing company that predominantly sells audio equipment. The company was established by Amar Bose in 1964 and is based in Framingham, Massachusetts. It is best known for its home audio systems and speakers, noise-canceling headphones, professional audio products, and vehicle sound systems. Bose has a reputation for being particularly protective of its patents, trademarks, and brands. The majority owner of Bose Corporation is the Massachusetts Institute of Technology (MIT). Non-voting shares were donated to MIT by founder Amar Bose and receive cash dividends. The company's annual report for the 2021 financial year stated that Bose Corporation's yearly sales were $3.2 billion, and the company employed about 7,000 people.

== History ==
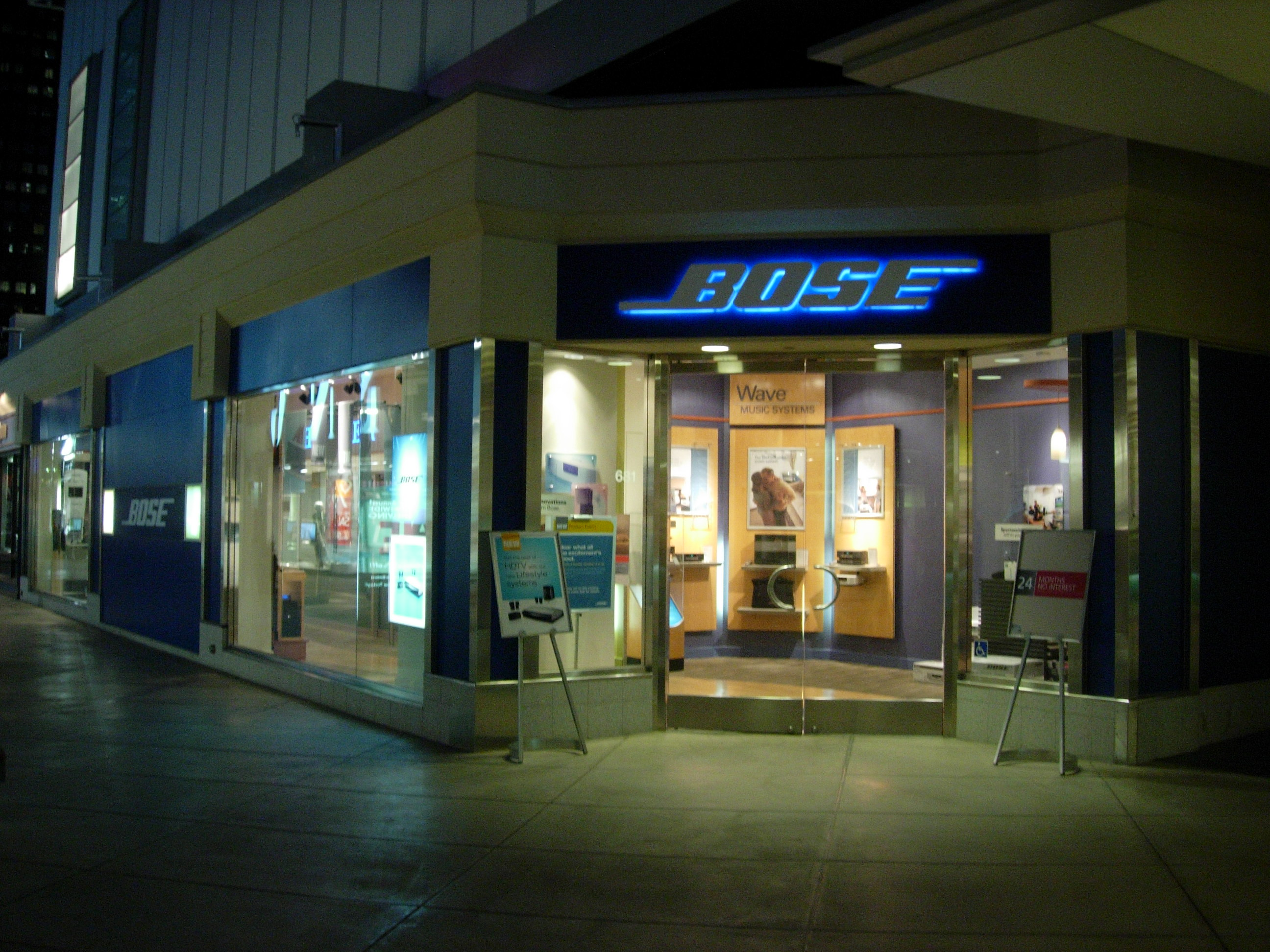
Bose store in Century City

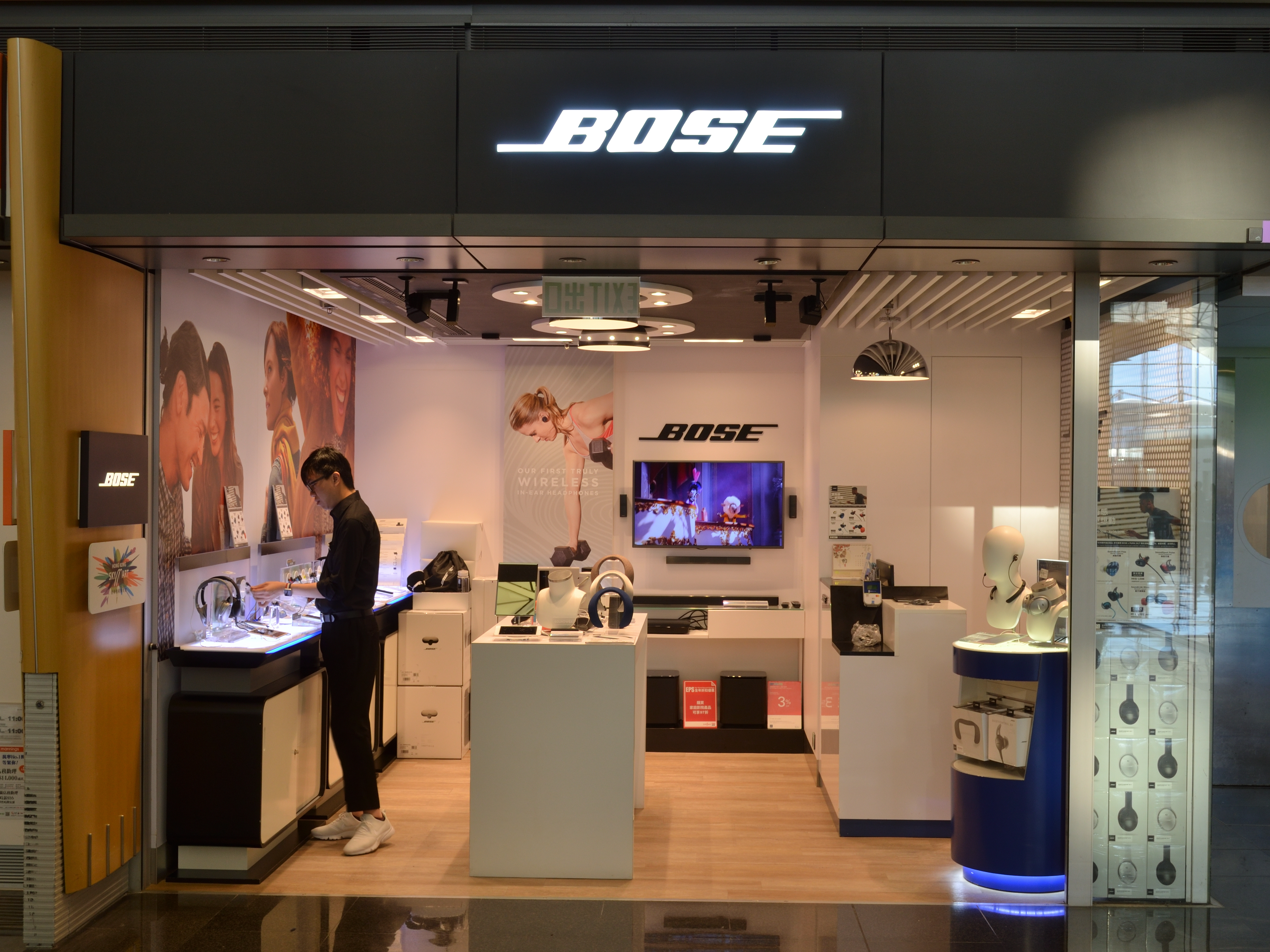
Bose store at the Hong Kong International Airport

The company was founded in Massachusetts in 1964 by Amar Bose with angel investor funding, including Amar's thesis advisor and professor, Y. W. Lee. Bose's interest in speaker systems had begun in 1956 when he purchased an audio system and was disappointed with its performance. The purpose of the company was to develop speaker systems which used multiple speakers aimed at the surrounding walls to reflect the sound and replicate the sound of a concert hall.

In 1966, after 10 years of research, the Bose 2201 was the first product sold by the company. It was an unusual design consisting of 22 speakers, with many of them facing away from the listener. The 2201 was designed to be located in the corner of a room, using reflections off the walls to increase the apparent size of the room. The 2201 failed in the marketplace and was discontinued the same year.

After this experience, Bose concluded that the audio system measurement techniques of the time (such as measuring distortion and frequency response) were ineffective ways to evaluate the goal of natural sound reproduction. Bose argued that the listener's perception was the best measure of audio quality. In 1968, the company introduced the Bose 901 stereo speaker system, which used eight mid-range drivers pointing toward the wall behind the speaker, and a ninth driver toward the listener. This design aimed to achieve a dominance of reflected over direct sound in home listening spaces. The design used for the 901 was unconventional compared with most systems, where mid-range and high-frequency speakers directly face the listener. The 901 was an immediate commercial success. As a result, Bose Corporation experienced rapid growth during the 1970s. The Bose 901 model name was a mainstay of the Bose line-up for many years, being produced from 1968 until 2016.

In 1991, a team of Bose researchers debunked a 1989 experiment that claimed to have created energy through cold fusion.

The first Bose retail store was opened in 1993 in Kittery, Maine.

In 2005, Bob Maresca was named president of Bose. Maresca had been promoted to vice president of Bose’s largest business, the Home Entertainment Division, in 2002.

In 2011, then-chairman and primary stockholder Amar Bose donated the majority of the firm's non-voting shares to his former employer and alma mater, the Massachusetts Institute of Technology. An annual cash dividend is paid out to "advance the research and education mission of MIT." However, the conditions of receiving the shares stated that MIT was not allowed to sell them, nor was MIT permitted to participate in the company's management and governance. Following Amar Bose's death in 2013, Bob Maresca became the chief executive officer (CEO).

In June 2016, Bose and Flex manufacturing extended their strategic partnership, transferring Bose operations in Malaysia and Mexico to Flex.

At the end of 2017, Maresca stepped down as CEO, and Bose President Phil Hess took the position. Maresca remained Chairman of the Board.

In January 2020, Bose announced that it would be closing all its more than 100 retail stores in North America, Japan, Europe, and Australia. About 130 stores would remain open in Asia and the Middle East. It would also retain its online presence, as well as sell its products through Target, Best Buy, and Amazon.

In late January 2020, President and COO Jim Scammon, who had worked at Bose for 30 years, replaced Phil Hess.

In August 2020, Bose selected its first female CEO, Lila Snyder, who was formerly an executive at Pitney Bowes. Snyder, who took her position in September 2020, is an MIT alumna, having earned her masters and Ph.D. degrees in mechanical engineering there.

In November, 2024, Bose announced that it had acquired the McIntosh Group for an undisclosed sum from private equity group Highlander Partners, LP. The McIntosh Group owns McIntosh Laboratory and Sonus Faber.

On October 1, 2026 Bose announced the acquisition of Firelight Technologies, the company behind the video game sound effects engine called FMOD.

On October 21, 2026, Skullcandy and Bose announced that Bose would purchase Skullcandy for an undisclosed sum. Bose had previously collaborated with them on earbud audio tuning. As part of the announcement, Bose said that they would keep Skullcandy headquartered in Park City, Utah.

== Production facilities ==
Bose's products are manufactured in the United States, Mexico, China, and Malaysia. The company's factories in the U.S. are located in Framingham, Massachusetts (also the site of the company headquarters), Westborough, Massachusetts and Stow, Massachusetts. In early 2021, Bose Corporation notified the Town of Stow of the intention to vacate the 81.5 acre Stow campus after 18 years at the site, moving nearly 1,500 employees to the Framingham headquarters. The Bose factories in Mexico are located in Tijuana and San Luis Río Colorado. The Malaysian Bose factory is located in Batu Kawan and is the company's Asia-Pacific and Middle East distribution hub. In 2015, two facilities in Columbia, South Carolina, US and Carrickmacross, Ireland, were closed (with the loss of 300 and 140 jobs, respectively) as part of a global streamlining of Bose's supply chain. Bose used the Columbia facility, which opened in 1996, for distribution and repair, sub-manufacturing and regional manufacturing, and final assembly for some headsets. The Carrickmacross factory began operations in 1978 and did the final assembly for some home theater systems, Wave radios, and other regional manufacturing. The operation of the San Luis and Batu Kawan factories, which were opened in 1990 and 2013, respectively, were taken over by contract manufacturer Flex in 2016 and continued to produce Bose products.

== Products ==
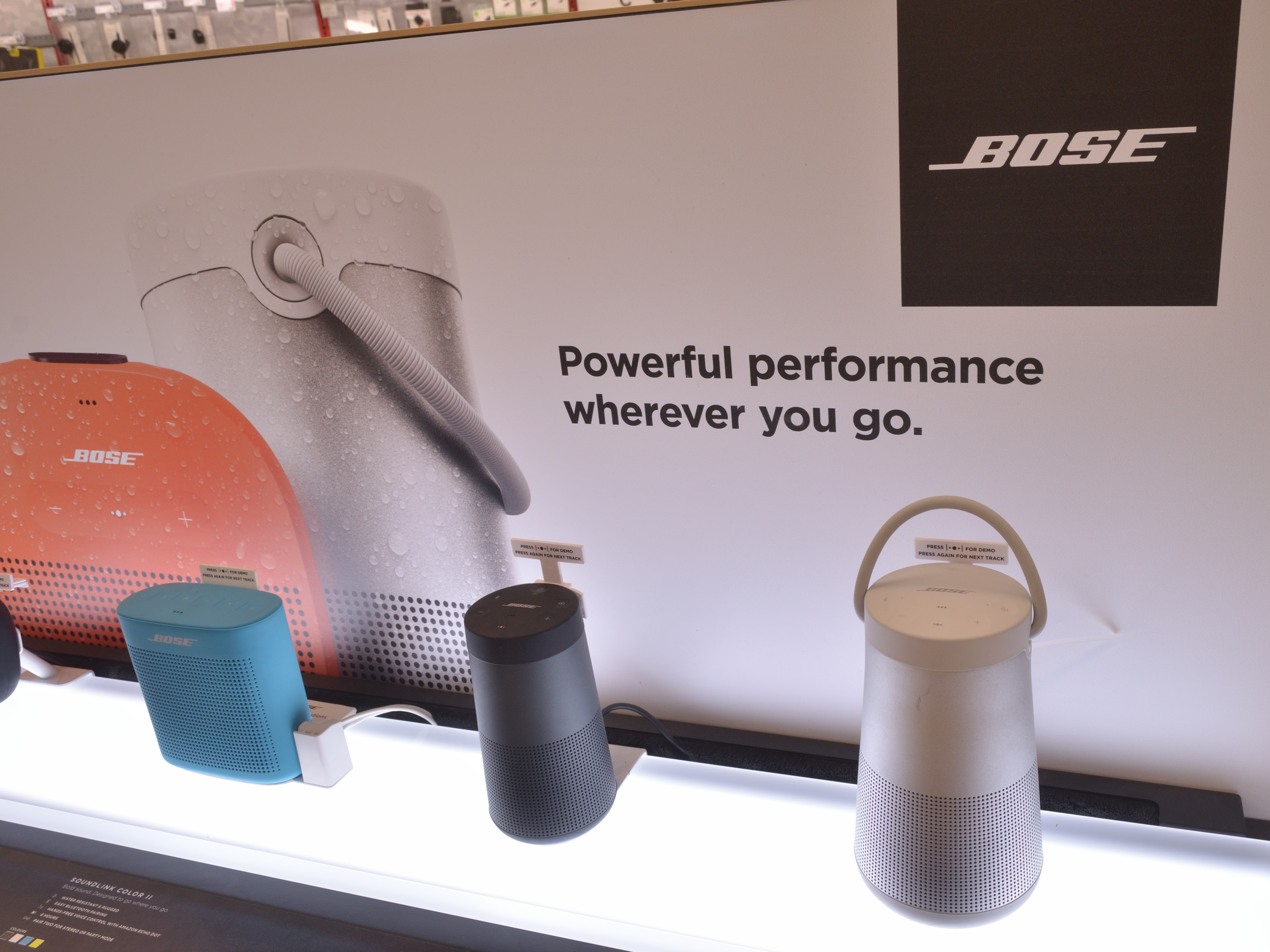
Bose products at a Staples store

=== Automotive ===
Following an unsuccessful attempt to sell aftermarket car speakers, Bose's first OEM audio installation was in a MY1983 Cadillac Seville. Bose has since supplied audio systems for many car manufacturers, such as Acura, Audi, BMW, Chevrolet, Ford, General Motors, Honda, Hyundai-Kia, Infiniti, Jaguar, Lexus, Mazda, Mercedes-Benz, Nissan, Porsche, and Ram. In 2007, the Bose media system won the International Telematics Award for the "Best Storage Solution for In-Car Environment."

A prototype active suspension system, using electromagnetic motors instead of hydraulic/pneumatic power, was unveiled by the company in 2004 and was due for release in 2009. However, it did not materialize due to weight and cost. The system used electromagnetic linear motors to raise or lower the wheels of a vehicle in response to uneven bumps or potholes on the road. The wheels are raised when approaching a bump (or lowered into a pothole) to keep the vehicle level, using principles similar to noise cancelling audio devices. A prototype car had been engineered to jump over an obstacle. The company said the system was too expensive and heavy, even after development for more than 20 years and costing $100 million. In November 2017, it was reported that Bose had sold the technology to ClearMotion. In May 2018, it was announced that five major car manufacturers had expressed interest in the technology and that it may be available in 2019 for low-volume vehicles and by 2020 for the mass market. In May 2025, Bose's active suspension was first put into production through one of ClearMotion’s investment partners, specifically a Chinese EV startup's flagship luxury sedan called the Nio ET9. ClearMotion have moved onward to the CM1 software centric electrohydraulic solution.

A truck seat system called Bose Ride was introduced in 2010. This active seat system aims to reduce fatigue, back pain, and physical stress experienced by truck drivers by reducing vibration from the road. Bose claimed up to a 90% reduction in driver's seat vibration.

=== Home audio and video ===
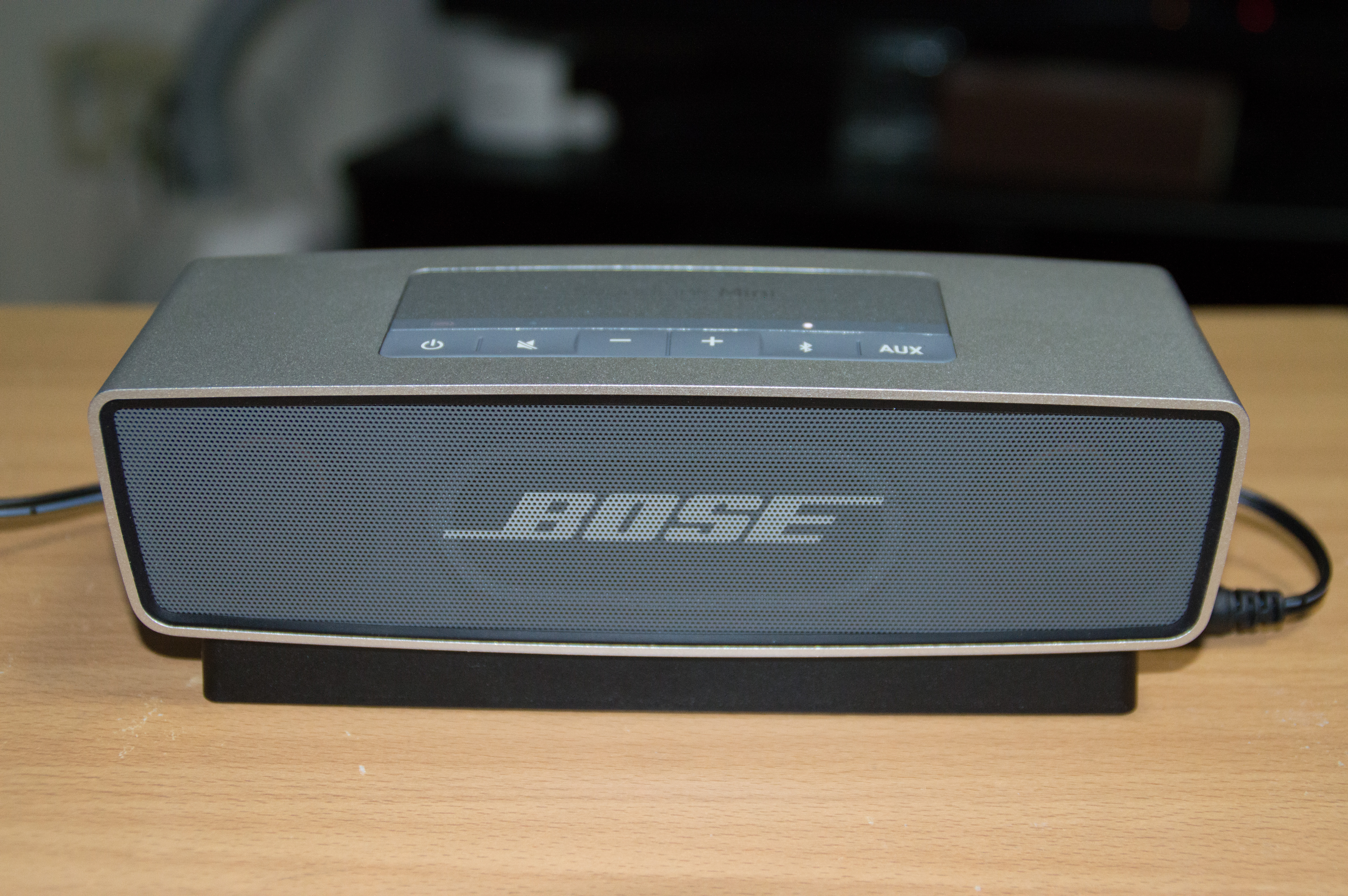
SoundLink Mini

Bose's product range has included:

- Home theater (2.1 systems, 5.1 systems, and speaker packages)
- Portable Bluetooth Speaker (marketed as "SoundLink")
- Stereo speakers (marketed as "Wave Systems," "SoundDock," and "SoundLink Air")
- Computer speakers
- Smart home devices
- Soundbar devices

In 2012, Bose was the highest-selling company in the United States for retail home theater systems and the third highest-selling for portable audio products.

=== Headphones ===
The company has sold aviation headsets (the first being the "Bose Aviation Headset") since 1989 and consumer headphones (Bose's QuietComfort headphones, the first noise-cancelling headphones designed for airline passengers) since 2000. The current range of headphones/headsets consists of over-ear, in-ear, aviation, and military models.

Bose has contracts with the U.S. military and NASA.

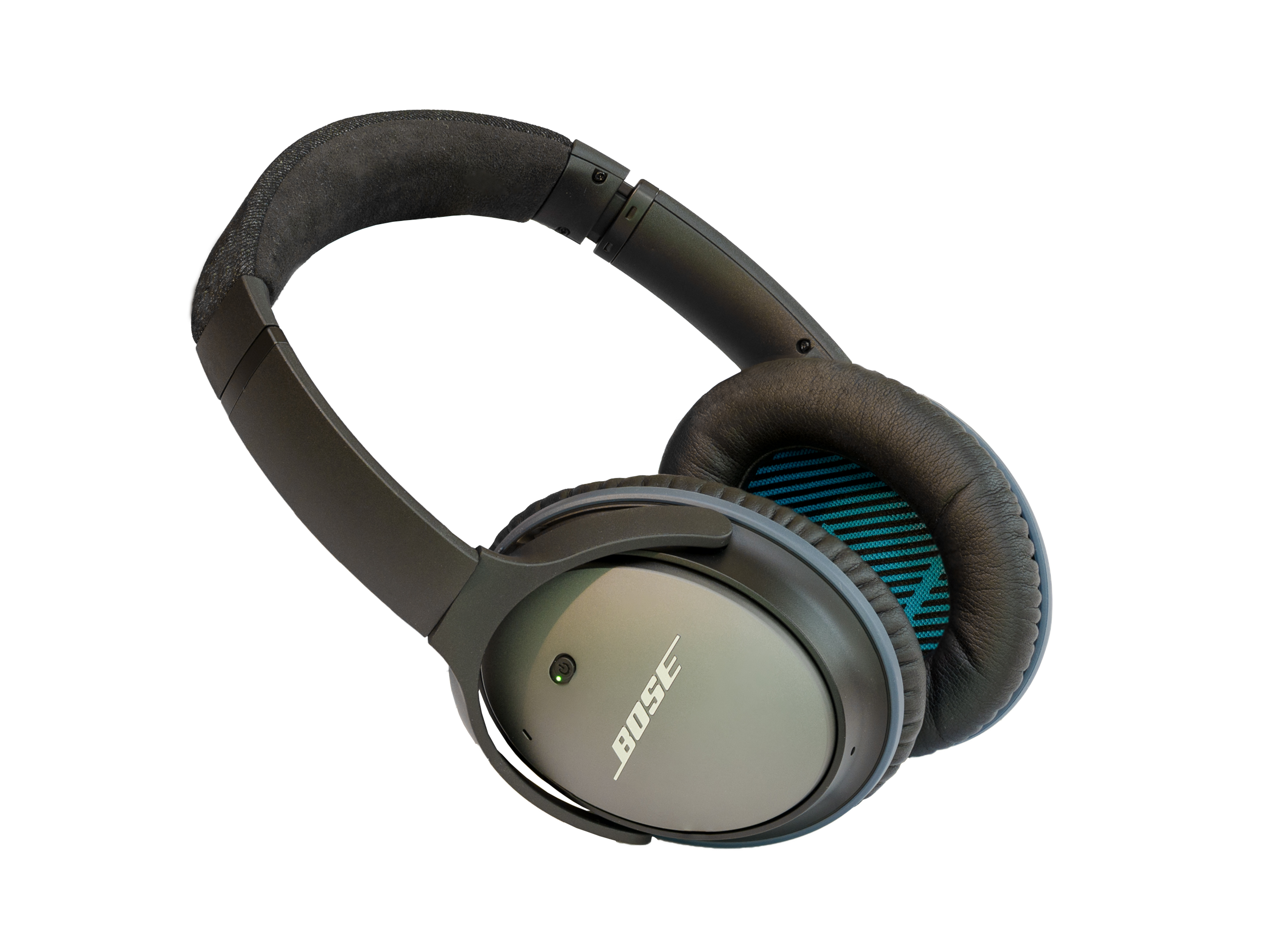
QuietComfort 25 headphones

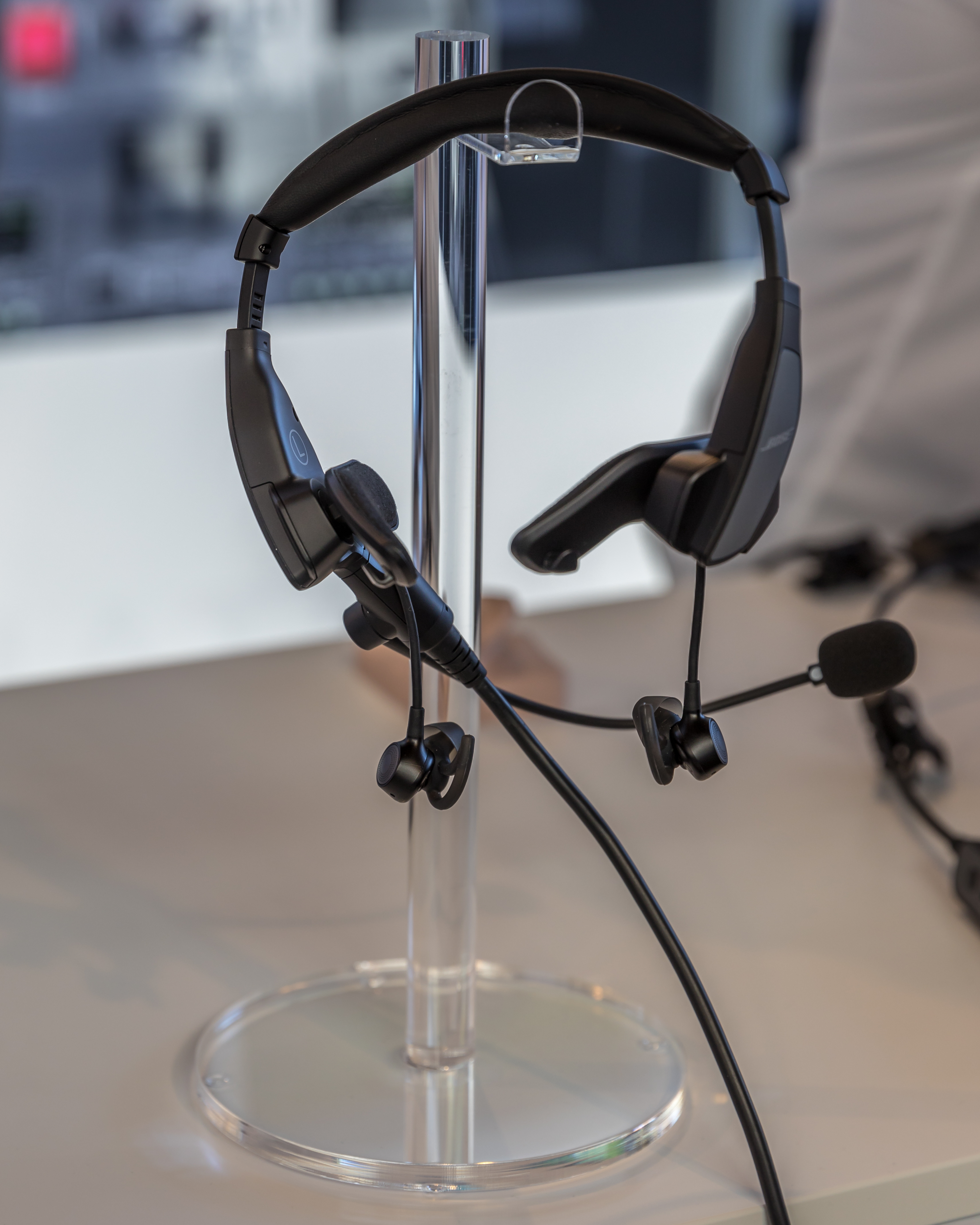
ProFlight aviation headset

=== Commercial sound systems ===
The Bose Professional division was established in 1972 to produce and install public address systems. In 2009, the division accounted for about 60% of Bose's annual revenue. Bose was the first company to pay for the title of official Olympics sound system supplier, providing audio equipment for the 1988 and 1992 Winter Olympics in Calgary and Albertville, respectively. Bose's systems have not received THX certification. The Bose L1 is a range of portable line array loudspeaker systems for musicians. The L1 was introduced in 2003 with models retroactively known as the "L1 Classic" range. These products were replaced by the "L1 Model I" and "L1 Model II" in 2007. A smaller and lighter "L1 Compact" model was introduced April 2009. The L1 Model I was replaced by the "L1 Model 1S" in 2012, and the "B1 Bass Module" was replaced by the larger "B2 Bass Module". Since the 1980s, Bose has offered 25-volt and 70-volt installed commercial audio systems for businesses.

== View on published specifications ==
The company is known for electing not to provide audio specifications for its products. This policy dates back to 1968, when Amar Bose published a paper titled "On the Design, Measurement, and Evaluation of Loudspeakers" wherein he rejected numerical test data in favor of subjective evaluation. In a 2007 interview, Amar stated: "There are two reasons we cut out the specifications: 1) We don't know of any measurements that actually determine anything about a product, and 2) Measurements are phony, in general, as they are printed."

== Reception ==
In some non-audio-related publications, Bose has been called a producer of "high-end audio" products. Commenting in 2007 on Bose's "high-end" market positioning among audiophiles, a PC Magazine product reviewer stated, "not only is Bose equipment's sound quality not up to audiophile standards, but one could buy something that does meet these stringent requirements for the same price or, often, for less." Also, Bose has not been certified by THX for its home entertainment products even though its more expensive home theater products compete at prices where THX certification is common. Some other views include:

- Bose's flagship 901 speaker system was given a negative review by Consumer Reports in 1970 (see Bose Corp. v. Consumers Union of United States, Inc.). Stereophile magazine, in 1971, gave a mixed review, stating the system was unexceptional and unlikely to appeal to "perfectionists who have developed a taste for subtleties of detail and timbre". However, the author also stated that the system produced "a more realistic semblance of natural ambience than any other speaker system". A more recent positive review by TONE Audio found that the 901 was better than expected and a good value for the price range.
- A 2005 market study published by Forrester Research reported that Bose's brand name was among several computer and consumer electronics brands most trusted by U.S. consumers, including Dell and Hewlett-Packard.
- A 2007 review in Audioholics online magazine reiterated that Bose was costly for its performance. Of the Bose Lifestyle V20 Home Theater System, the reviewer wrote, "The Bose system is very expensive at nearly $2,000, and the sound quality isn't really any better than many other surround systems costing a third of the price... the smaller [bass] cones cannot reproduce lower tactile [sic] frequencies." The review included an interview with a Best Buy sales manager who suggested from his experience that, despite his directing customers to a better-sounding and less expensive alternative, some customers insisted on Bose.
- A July 2012 review by NBC News of the $5,000 46" Bose TV noted that the video screen, produced by Samsung, resembled most closely a $750 flat panel television and that the technology used was not up to par with other screens in the same category. The review questioned the additional cost for the Bose TV, suggesting there were compelling audio alternatives for less than 1/5th the price difference. The same system received a positive review by PC Magazine that cited the user interface and sound quality in an unobtrusive design.
- In July 2013, iLounge wrote about the Bose Soundlink Mini, a small remote speaker competing against inexpensive, low-end audio devices, that "Audio quality is SoundLink Mini's real trump card over Jambox and most—not all—of its competitors... SoundLink Mini delivers much deeper bass and cleaner mid-bass at all volumes, suffering from noticeable distortion solely at the top of its volume scale."

== Awards ==
In 2023, Bose's PowerShareX Adaptable Power Amplifier won "Best of Show" at InfoComm 2023 for Sound & Video Contractor.

In 2024, Bose's EdgeMax LP won "Best of Show" at InfoComm 2024 for AV Technology, Digital Signage, and Tech & Learning.

In 2025, Bose's DesignMax Luna won "Best of Show" at InfoComm 2025. The day before the InfoComm show, the winners of the SCN (Systems Contractor News) Installation Product Awards 2025 were announced, and Bose's Forum FC112 won "Most Innovative Speaker Solution (Installed)". At the 2025 rAVe Readers’ Choice Awards, Bose won "Favorite Speaker Brand" and "Favorite Audio Product of 2025" for the EdgeMax Loudspeaker. Also in 2025, Bose's Veritas Series won "Best New Audio Product" at rAVe’s Best of ISE (Integrated Systems Europe) Awards and "Best In-Room Audio Solution" at rAVe’s Best of InfoComm Awards.

In 2026, Bose's DesignMax Luna won Best of Show at ISE 2026.

== Legal actions ==
Audio industry professionals have described Bose as a litigious company. In 1981, Bose unsuccessfully sued the magazine Consumer Reports (CR) for libel. CR reported in a review that the sound from the system they reviewed "tended to wander about the room." Initially, the Federal District Court found that CR "had published the false statement with knowledge that it was false or with reckless disregard of its truth or falsity" when it changed what the original reviewer wrote about the speakers in his pre-publication draft, that the sound tended to wander "along the wall." The Court of Appeals then reversed the trial court's ruling on liability, and the United States Supreme Court affirmed in a 6–3 vote in the case Bose Corp. v. Consumers Union of United States, Inc., finding the statement was made without actual malice, and therefore there was no libel.

In an interview decades later Amar Bose said "We had 37 people at the time. I gathered them in one room and said, 'If we don't do anything, it will probably kill us. But if we do something, we have no credibility since we're just a small company, and we can't do anything against this.' I said I think we oughtta do something. I wanted a vote. It was unanimous in favor of taking action. Little did we know it would take 14 years to go through the legal process."

Bose sued Thiel Audio in the early 1990s to stop the audiophile loudspeaker maker from using ".2" at the end of its product model "CS2.2". To comply with Bose's trademark of ".2" associated with the Bose Model 2.2 product, Thiel changed their model name to "CS2 2", substituting a space for the decimal point. Bose did not trademark ".3" so in 1997 when Thiel introduced the next model in the series, it named it the "Thiel 2.3", advertising "the return of the decimal point."

In 1996, Bose sued two subsidiaries of Harman International Industries—JBL and Infinity Systems—for violating a Bose patent on elliptical tuning ports on some loudspeaker products. In 2000, the court determined that Harman was to cease using elliptical ports in its products, and Harman was to pay Bose $5.7 million in court costs. Harman stopped using the disputed port design but appealed the financial decision. At the end of 2002, the earlier judgment was upheld, but by this time, Bose's court expenses had risen to $8 million, all to be paid by Harman.

Bose was successful in blocking QSC Audio Products from trademarking the term "PowerWave" in connection with a specific QSC amplifier technology. In 2002, a court decided the "Wave" trademark was worthy of greater protection because it was well-known on its own, even beyond its association with Bose.

In 2003, Bose sued Custom Electronics Design and Installation Association (CEDIA), a non-profit electronics trade organization, for use of the "Electronic Lifestyles" trademark, which CEDIA has been using since 1997. Bose argued that the trademark interfered with its own "Lifestyle" trademark. Bose had previously sued to protect its "Lifestyle" trademark since 1996, with success against Motorola and then settlements against New England Stereo, Lifestyle Technologies, Optoma, and AMX. In May 2007, CEDIA won the lawsuit after the court determined Bose to be guilty of laches (unreasonable delays) and that Bose's assertions of fraud and the likelihood of confusion were without merit. CEDIA was criticized for spending nearly $1 million of its members' money on the lawsuit, and Bose was criticized for "unsportsmanlike action against its own trade association," according to CE Pro magazine.

In July 2014, Bose sued Beats Electronics for patent infringement, alleging that its "Studio" headphones line incorporated Bose noise-canceling technology. Bose and Apple had collaborated on the SoundDock for iPod music players in 2004. Then, in May 2014, Apple bought Beats, bringing Bose and Apple into direct competition in the headphone market. In Apple stores, Bose headphones were once the foremost brand offered, but at the time of the lawsuit, Beats products outnumbered Bose. In 2014, for the total premium headphone market share, Beats held 62%, and Bose held 22%. In October 2014, Bose dropped the lawsuit, as Bose and Beats settled out of court without revealing the terms. Apple removed all Bose products from its Apple stores a few days after the lawsuit was settled, but two months later, Bose products returned.

In April of 2017, Bose was sued alleging a privacy violation regarding the mobile phone apps delivered by Bose to control their Bluetooth headphones.

== Philanthropy ==
In 2023, Bose partnered with Billboard, Porsche, and the non-profit initiative She Is The Music to create its "Turn the Dial" initiative, which focused on addressing gender barriers in music production. The initiative was a "Social Movement Campaign" finalist at the 9th Annual Shorty Impact Awards and a "Social Good Campaign" finalist at the 16th Annual Shorty Impact Awards.
