= Suzuki Motor Corp. v. Consumers Union of the U.S., Inc. =

1996 American libel law case

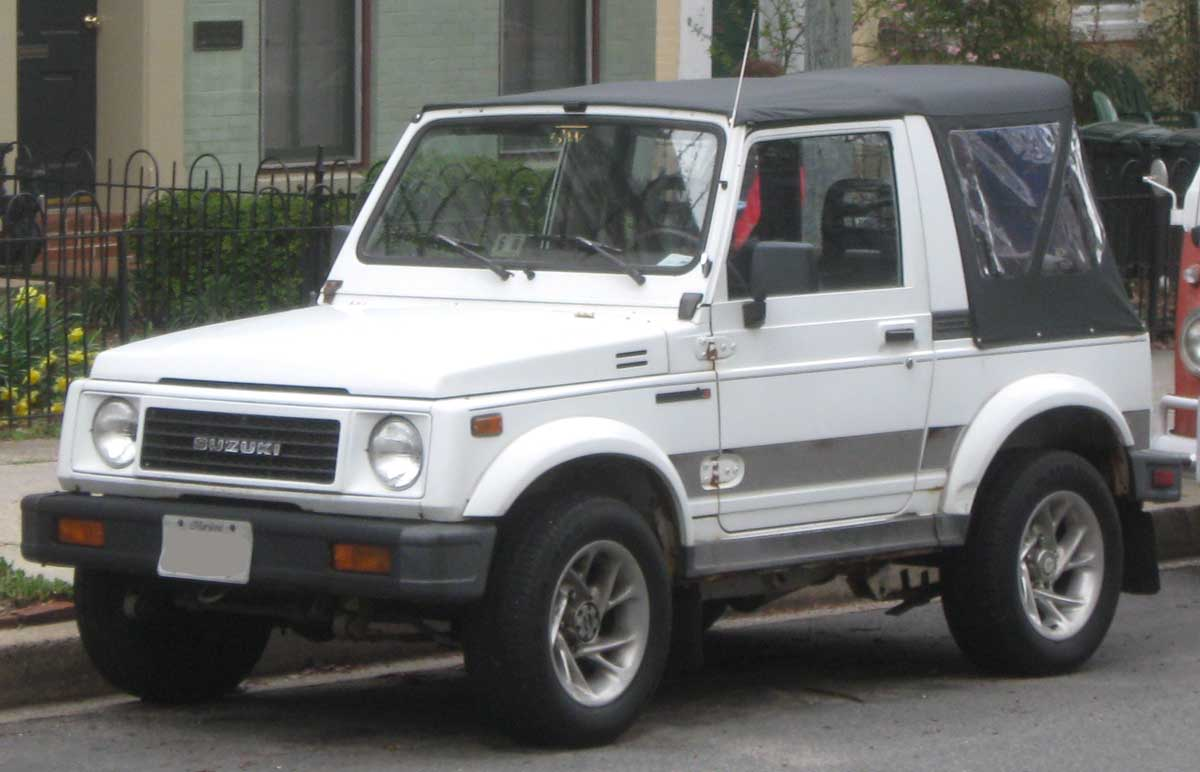
- US-market Suzuki Samurai
- Court: United States Court of Appeals for the Ninth Circuit
- Decided: May 19, 2003
- Citation: 330 F.3d 1110

Case history
- Appealed from: United States District Court for the Central District of California

Court membership
- Judges sitting: Warren J. Ferguson, A. Wallace Tashima, Susan P. Graber

Case opinions
- Summary judgment for defendant reversed, case remanded.
- Decision by: A. Wallace Tashima
- Concurrence: Susan P. Graber
- Dissent: Warren J. Ferguson

Suzuki Motor Corp. v. Consumers Union of U.S. was a 1996 lawsuit initiated by Suzuki of North America against Consumers Union, filed eight years after their magazine Consumer Reports gave a very unfavorable and much disputed review of the Suzuki Samurai, deeming the Samurai "not acceptable" in their ratings.

== Consumer Reports driving tests and review ==
The compact SUV Suzuki Samurai gained a reputation in the U.S. market of being an unsafe car and prone to a rollover after Consumer Reports (CR), the magazine arm of Consumers Union, reported that during a 1988 test on the short course avoidance maneuver (Consumer Union Short Course Double Lane Change; CUSC), the Samurai experienced what they deemed as an unacceptable amount of tipover while undertaking the severe turn.

The behavior which CU deemed unacceptable stemmed from the sudden swerve simulation part of the test where, for example, a car backs out of a driveway or drives forward from a side street or intersection and into traffic, causing the driver to suddenly swerve to avoid hitting the object that is obstructing the driver's path.

The unacceptable tipover behavior occurred after the standard course was modified to induce the tipover behavior, which did not occur while experienced drivers utilized the standard course. CU staff were attempting to replicate an unintentional Samurai roll-over incident, involving a CU staff member, which had occurred previously during the evaluation of the Samurai. There were claims made by Suzuki that CU put the Samurai through an abnormal series of tests in an effort to roll the car.

The dispute and eventual lawsuit stemmed from the CR statement "easily rolls over in turns", which CR attributed to the sudden swerve test and was not meant to generally apply to the Samurai in respect to other tests that CR undertakes to simulate normal routine driving, such as 0–60 mph acceleration and stopping. The use of the adverb easily may have been misconstrued or misunderstood by others to indicate that the Samurai was inherently an unsafe car prone to roll-overs in any sort of driving conditions. In 1996, Consumers Union proclaimed that Suzuki saw "Samurai sales dwindle away" as a result of the 1988 review.

== Lawsuit ==
External image
- "A 1988 Suzuki Samurai topples over during a safety test sponsored by Consumers Reports magazine" at Wall Street Journal

Suzuki hired Failure Analysis Associates (FaAA, now Exponent) to perform the initial investigation on the roll-over problem. FaAA was critical of Consumers Union's testing procedure and indicated other factors such as the type of tires and driver behavior may have contributed to roll-overs. Because of FaAA's report, Suzuki filed a libel suit against Consumers Union in 1996, eight years after the publication of the test results in Consumer Reports, on the grounds that the statements made by CU damaged their reputation and the reputation of their vehicles. Suzuki sued for $60 million in damages and unspecified punitive damages for what Suzuki claimed was willfully fraudulent testing. After an 8-year legal battle, CU and Suzuki settled out of court through mutual consent in 2004.

=== Settlement ===
In the settlement, CR agreed that it "never intended to imply that the Samurai easily rolls over in routine driving conditions." A joint announcement of the settlement stated that "CU and Suzuki disagree with respect to the validity" of CU's tests. "Suzuki disputes the validity" of the tests, and "CU stands by its test protocol and findings."

According to CU, Suzuki internal documents indicate that the company was aware of the Samurai’s rollover problem. A Suzuki memorandum dated July 14, 1985, stated: "It is imperative that we develop a crisis plan that will primarily deal with the ‘roll’ factor. Because of the narrow wheelbase, similar to the Jeep, the car is bound to turn over." Over the years, over 200 Suzuki Samurai rollover lawsuits have been settled, and Suzuki's own expert witnesses testified the automaker was aware of 213 deaths and 8,200 injuries involving Suzuki Samurai rollovers.

== See also ==
- Bose Corp. v. Consumers Union of United States, Inc. (1984)
