= List of Bose headphones =

Bose has sold aviation headsets since 1989 and consumer headphones since 2000. The current range of headphones and headsets includes wireless over-ear models, true wireless in-ear models, as well as aviation and military models.

== Wireless over-ear headphones ==
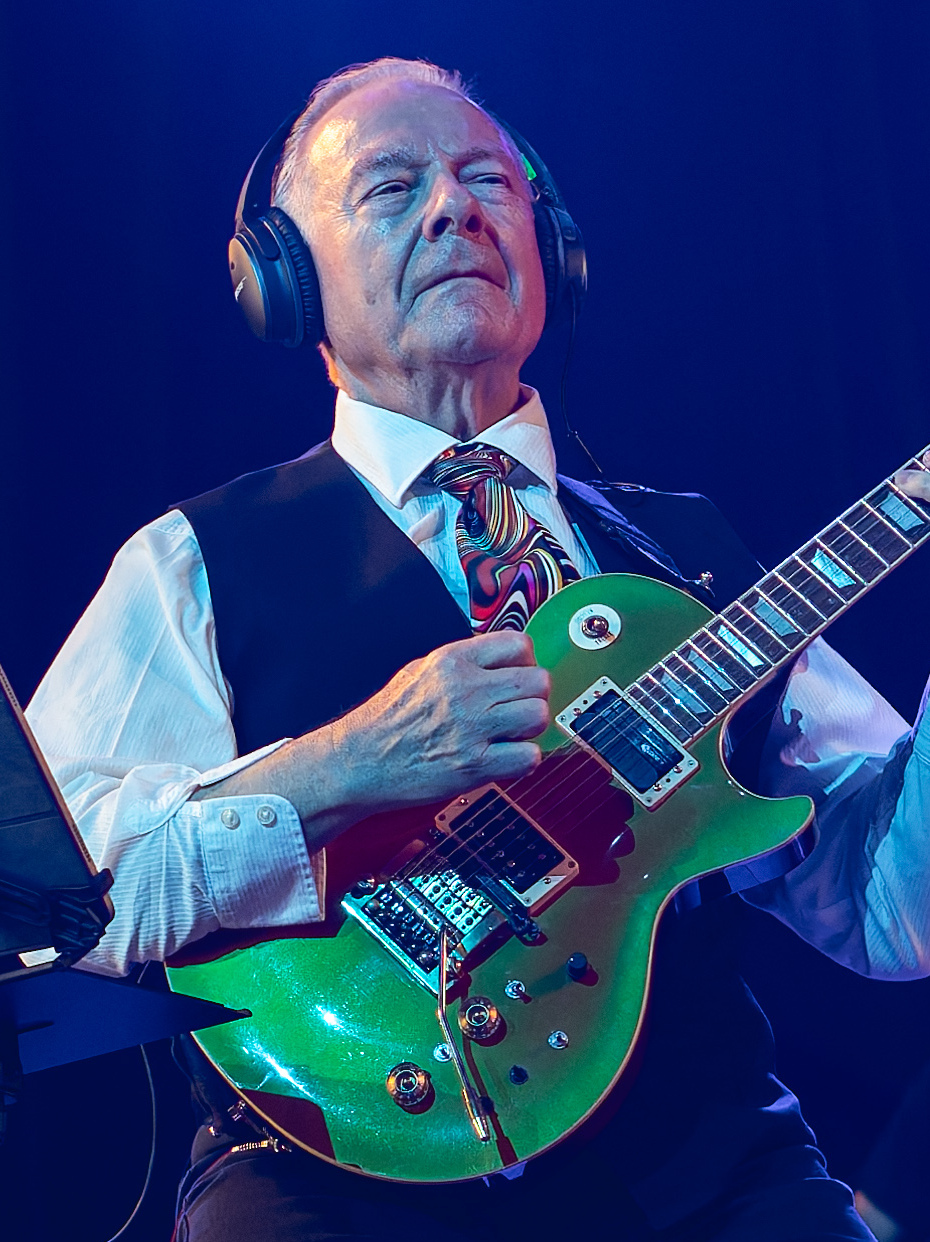
Robert Fripp wearing Bose QuietComfort 25 headphones with a wire during a performance

Development of the company's noise cancelling headphones (and first over-ear headphones) began in 1978 when the chairman, Amar Bose, tried a set of airline-supplied headphones during a flight and found that engine noise from the aircraft prevented the music from being enjoyed.

In 1986, Bose and Sennheiser both presented active noise cancelling headsets for aircraft pilots, with the Sennheiser design appearing in a Funkschau paper and the Bose design appearing in an ASME paper. A prototype Bose product was used to prevent hearing loss in pilots during the first non-stop around-the-world flight in the Rutan Voyager. The company was the first to release active noise cancelling headphones as a consumer product.

=== QuietComfort 35 II ===
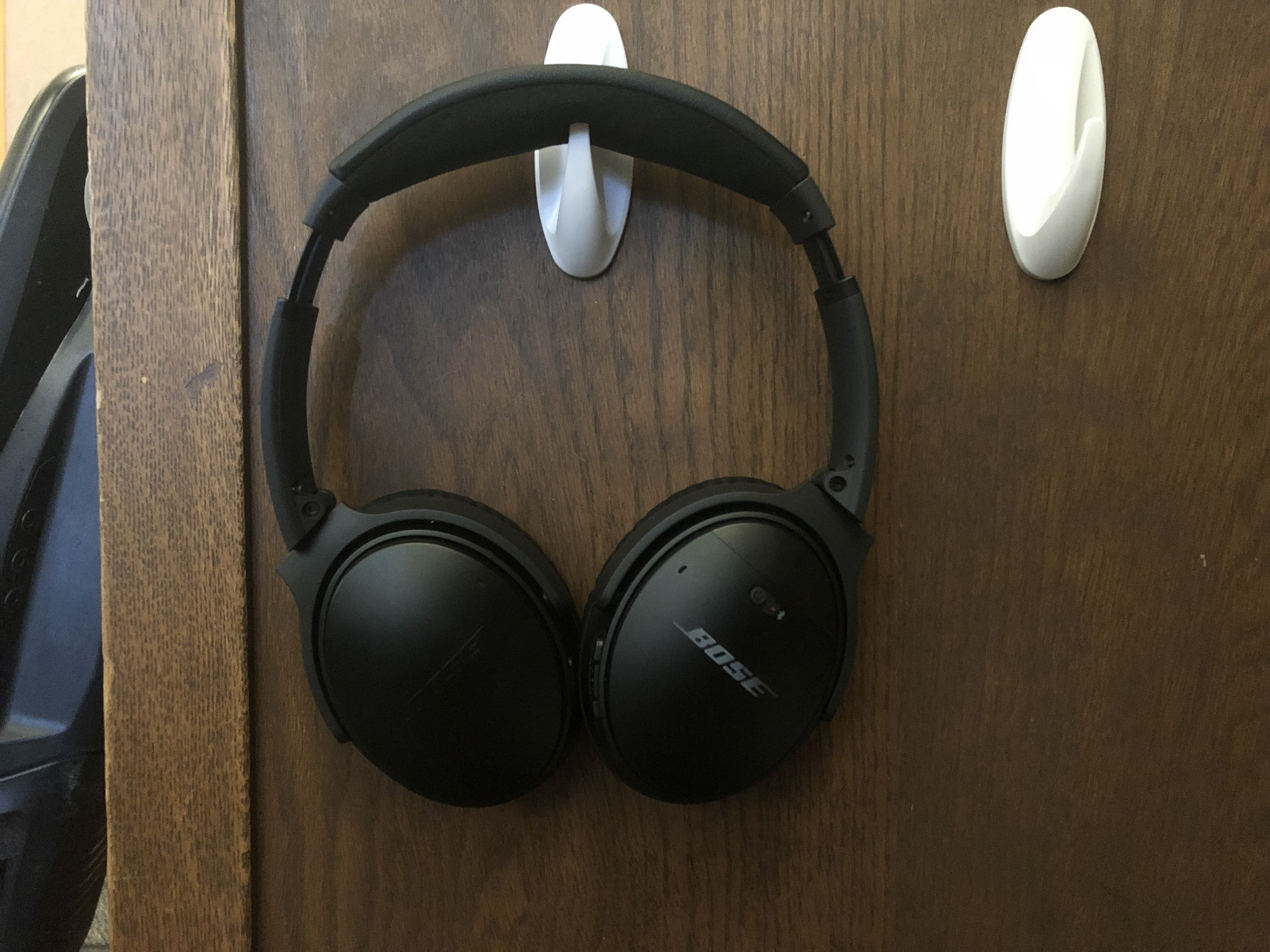
QuietComfort 35 II

In 2017, Bose released an updated model known as the QuietComfort 35 II, which adds a customizable "action" button on the left ear cap. By default, it is mapped to activate the Google Assistant, making it the first headphones to integrate with the service.

The QC35 II was reviewed favorably for their noise cancellation, audio quality and comfort.

In July 2019, users began to report that a firmware update to the QC35 II had inhibited the performance of the noise cancellation features. Bose stated that it had not made any changes to noise cancellation functions in their firmware. Some users performed firmware downgrades, but Bose later prevented this for security reasons. In October 2019, as part of an investigation, Bose began to allow owners within a "reasonable" proximity to the company's headquarters in Framingham, Massachusetts, to request a visit by a technician.

In 2020, Bose released the Bose QC35 II Gaming, which adds a gaming mic.

=== Noise Cancelling Headphones 700 ===
In 2019, Bose released the Noise Cancelling Headphones 700, also known as the NCH 700, a new high-end product positioned above the QC 35.

The headphones have a stainless steel band and are controlled using a mix of buttons and touch-sensitive areas on the cups. Unlike the QC 35, they do not fold in half, but their ear cups can rotate for storage. The embedded rechargeable battery is not replaceable which limits the lifespan of the headphones to the life of the battery. Bose promoted improvements to sound quality, noise cancellation and voice call quality over the QC 35. The NCH 700 can also connect to two devices simultaneously, and integrate with Amazon Alexa and Siri in addition to the Google Assistant.

=== Noise Cancelling Headphones 700 UC ===
This is the same headphone as the 700 but a Bose USB Link dongle is included, supposedly enhancing sound and microphone quality. But, it is listed for a larger price.

=== QuietComfort 45 ===
In August 2021, Bose released the Bose QuietComfort 45 headphones. In addition to adding USB-C support to the QuietComfort model, Bose also added a fourth external microphone to improve call quality and Bluetooth 5.1 to improve wireless range. The rechargeable battery is not replaceable.

=== QuietComfort SE ===
The SE are QC45 with a soft case instead of the hard case, apparently the SE stands for soft envelope.

=== QuietComfort ===
In September 2023, Bose released the new QuietComfort headphones this time with no model number designation. The logo returns to the black colour of the 2 generations old QC35 II rather than the light grey of the most recent QC45. Visual difference: The QC35 uses Micro USB, QuietComfort USB-C.

This QC model offers 10 levels of adjustable ANC and 24 hours of battery life.

=== QuietComfort SC ===
In May 2024, Bose released an SC bundle variation of the October 2023 QuietComfort. The headphones are identical but are bundled with a soft case (hence SC) rather than a hard shell case like all previous models had. This bundle comes at a slightly cheaper price point.

=== QuietComfort Ultra ===
In October 2023, Bose released the new QuietComfort Ultra headphones, which feature a modern, more premium design. The QuietComfort Ultra enhances the listening experience with spatial audio capabilities, offering an immersive soundstage. These headphones come equipped with improved active noise cancellation, leveraging advanced algorithms for better performance in various environments. The Ultra model also includes Bluetooth 5.3, providing a more stable connection and lower latency. Additionally, the battery life has been extended, offering up to 28 hours of playback on a single charge. Similar to the QuietComfort 45, the battery is not user-replaceable.

=== QuietComfort Ultra (2nd Gen) ===
In September 2025, Bose released QuietComfort Ultra (2nd Gen).

=== QuietComfort (2nd Gen) ===
Released in August 2026. Slightly updated design, added Bluetooth 5.4 and USB-C audio.

=== Audio sunglasses Bluetooth headphones ===
The Bluetooth sunglasses were released in 2019 and come in two styles – Alto and Rondo. The sunglasses have open-ear audio, UVA/UVB protection, an integrated microphone, a Bluetooth range of 9 meters, and are also AR enabled. The battery can sustain up to 3.5 hours of streaming music playback and takes up to 2 hours to charge.

== Wired in-ear headphones ==
=== Noise Cancelling Wired Earbuds ===
In October 2026, Bose released the Bose Noise Cancelling Wired Earbuds. It is the first set of wired in-ear headphones to be released by the company in 11 years. Raza Haider, president of Bose's premium audio division, stated that development on the earbuds were completed within less than a year, in response to renewed consumer interest in wired headphones. The earbuds are powered by and connect via USB-C, featuring adaptive ANC, an Aware mode for transparency, and are rated IPX4 for water resistance. Playback output is fixed at 24bit/48kHz.

== True wireless in-ear headphones ==
True wireless headphones have no cord to keep each bud connected to each other.

=== Noise-cancelling headphones ===
==== QuietComfort Earbuds II ====
QuietComfort Earbuds II were launched on 15 September 2022. 7 The QuietComfort Earbuds II headphones and ear tips are smaller and lighter than the original QuietComfort Earbuds counterparts that they replace.

Specifications:

- Earbuds
  - Bluetooth 5.3
  - IPX4
- USB-C supported carry case. The battery life is 6 hours and the USB-C supported carry case has an inbuilt lithium iodine battery can charge them three times.

===== Awards =====
- What Hi-Fi? Award 2022 as the 'Best wireless earbuds over £200'.
- CNET's Best Wireless Earbuds for 2022, as well as a CNET's Editors' Choice Award of 8.8/10 points.
- PCMag Editors' Choice award in 2022 for the best in-ear active noise-cancellation.

==== QuietComfort Ultra Earbuds ====
Released 2023.

==== Open-Ear Earbuds ====
Released September 2024.

==== QuietComfort Earbuds (2nd generation) ====
On September 18th 2024, Bose released the 2nd generation of the QuietComfort Earbuds. Three colors options were available at launch (Black, White Smoke, and Chilled Lilac) with Ice Blue, Petal Pink and Twilight Blue arriving later.

== Aviation headsets ==
=== A30 Aviation Headset ===
The "A30 Aviation Headset" was released in 2023 as the successor to the "A20 Aviation Headset" with extended noise cancellation and less clamping force than its predecessor. It has a claimed battery life of 45 hours (using two AA batteries) or can be powered by the airplane's electrical system. However, if continuously using Bluetooth functionality, the battery-life will only last 25-plus hours. It has three selectable modes of active noise cancellation.

=== A20 Aviation Headset ===
The "A20 Aviation Headset" was released in 2010 as the successor to the "Aviation Headset X" (aka A10). It has a claimed battery life of 45 hours (using two AA batteries) or can be powered by the airplane's electrical system. There are two versions, one with Bluetooth and one without.

An updated version of the A20 was released in 2015.

=== Combat Vehicle Crewman Headset ===
A "Combat Vehicle Crewman Headset" was released in 1998, for use in armoured vehicles.

=== Triport Tactical Headset ===
A "Triport Tactical Headset" (TTH) was released in 2004. It is designed for use in armoured vehicles and can fit under an infantry ballistic helmet. An updated version was released in 2012.

== Required software ==
=== Bose music ===
Bose Music is a proprietary mobile app that is required by products including the QuietComfort Earbuds-series (QuietComfort Earbuds II, QuietComfort Earbuds).

==== Android ====
The Bose Music app in Android requires:

- Registration (email and password) and login.
- Bluetooth Low Energy (BLE), which requires Location Permission in Android 6 and above.
