= Lila Snyder =

American business executive

- Education: University of Miami; MIT
- Occupation: Business executive
- Employer: Bose Corporation
- Title: CEO of Bose
- Term: September 2020 – Present

Lila Snyder is an American business executive who has been the current CEO of Bose Corporation since September 2020.

== Education ==
Snyder holds a Bachelor of Science degree in Mechanical Engineering from the University of Miami, and Master of Science (S.M.) and Ph.d. in Mechanical Engineering from MIT.

== Career ==
Snyder joined the consulting firm McKinsey as a partner in 1998, later moving to Pitney Bowes, where her title was president of global e-commerce.

She then joined Bose Corporation in 2020 as its chief executive officer.

== Chairpersonships and board memberships ==
Snyder is a member of the board of directors for home builder PulteGroup Inc., and the Alumni Board of Directors for the University of Miami, and of the MIT School of Engineering Dean's Advisory Council.
