= Thiel Audio =

American loudspeaker manufacturer

THIEL Audio
- Company type: High performance audio equipment manufacturer
- Industry: Audio
- Founded: 1977
- Founder: Jim Thiel, Tom Thiel, Kathy Gornik
- Defunct: 2018
- Headquarters: Nashville, Tennessee
- Key people: Jim Thiel; Kathy Gornik David B. Griffin Chairman of the Board until bankruptcy
- Products: Audio electronics
- Website: thielaudio.com

THIEL Audio was an American privately held high performance loudspeaker (hi-end audio) manufacturer founded in Lexington, Kentucky, but later based in Nashville, Tennessee. Thiel Audio products were distributed to over 30 countries. All products by the founders were designed and built in their 35,000-square-foot (3,300 m^{2}) facility located in Lexington. Thiel ceased operations in 2018.

== History ==
Thiel Audio was formed by three college friends, Jim Thiel, Tom Thiel, and Kathy Gornik, who started in 1976 with equipment in the Thiels' garage on Georgetown Road in Lexington. Thiel Audio was formed with $25,000 borrowed from the partners' parents and some friends. Jim Thiel graduated from the University of Kentucky in 1968, majoring in physics. Thiel Audio first exhibited at the Consumer Electronics Show in 1977 (the year the company was commonly stated as being founded, although they had been selling since 1976) with the introduction of the 01 full-range speaker. A year later, in 1978, the model 03 introduced the principles of time, phase, and frequency coherence, which would become the basis for all of Jim Thiel's designs and the fundamental idea for which Thiel would be known.

A skilled woodworker, Tom Thiel built the speaker boxes. Their first hi-fi product was a two-way speaker with an equalizer to give it high-quality bass response. Jim Thiel soon realized that he would need someone to do the sales part of the business, so Gornik sought to sell them in her city, Washington, D.C.

Over the life of the company, Thiel had a number of long-lived series including the CS 2 which was first introduced in 1982 and updated through 2012 with the introduction of the CS 2.7.

In March 2006, Thiel unveiled the culmination of the CS 3 series, the Thiel CS 3.7, a high-performance speaker in the Middle East, at an event hosted by Emirates Computers, one of Dubai's leading technology companies.

In 2007, Thiel Audio announced that it would offer its high-performance line of loudspeakers in Crutchfield retail stores, the Crutchfield site, and through their catalogs. At the time, the primary lineup that Thiel was to offer through Crutchfield was priced from about $990 to $5,450. Thiel's products typically ranged from about $990 to $6,450.

Jim Thiel died of cancer on September 17, 2009.

In 2012, Thiel Audio was sold to a private equity company in Nashville, and later that year, Gornik was replaced as president of the company. Since the purchase, Thiel had five CEOs in five years, and discontinued all of Jim Thiel's original designs. The company reintroduced themselves as a high-end lifestyle brand, focused on surround sound systems based on more traditional engineering. The new company's speakers did not follow Jim Thiel's time/phase coherency premise, but they continued to use the custom-designed drivers.

Former president of Thiel Audio, Kathy Gornik, was also the chairwoman of the Consumer Electronics Association.

In 2016 Thiel underwent another leadership change in which Thiel launched their Entertainment Division in Jan 2016 and the birth of Aurora Nashville the nations first Live 4K Concert Streaming Studio experience and viewing platform in May 2016. The Studio opened to much acclaim in Nashville in 2016 and was the set for Aurora Live, WMOT, MTSU and many other performances. The studio provided live streaming and production services to clients (music labels and artists) both on platform and off platform allowing their clients to instantly play in the streaming arena.

At CES2017, Thiel returned to the main show floor and unveiled their 40th Anniversary line up, a custom finish build to order high-performance loudspeaker systems 40.1, 40.2, and 40.3. The 40th Anniversary Series was the first in a series of planned steps to bring Thiel back to its roots as an American built loudspeaker assembled in Nashville.

In addition, Thiel announced the arrival of the Aurora LifeStream connected speaker systems (HOME, TOUR, and STUDIO) to be sold by Aurora with custom designs for artists performing at the VIP studio in Nashville. The wireless speaker systems offered customizable elements of the design, multiple wireless protocols (DTS Play-fi, Bluetooth w/aptX, and Apple AirPlay) for expanded interoperability, Amazon Alexa voice compatibility. The result of the 9-month engineering effort won CES 2017 Best of Show awards in the Connected Home Products Category.

In the second half of 2017, Thiel went through yet another change in leadership which stripped the company of much of the talent and expertise and once again raised questions. Aurora Nashville was renamed under the Thiel brand and most streaming operations seem had come to a halt. Thiel announced the space that housed Aurora Nashville was now a product showroom that was in operation a few days a week. The LifeStream products were sold as Aurora by Thiel which added to the confusion.

In late 2017, amid rumours of the company's impending demise, long-time Thiel Service manager Rob Gillum purchased the service operation from Thiel Audio. He stated his intention was to provide repairs and warranty work to owners of "legacy" Thiel speakers.

On January 31, 2018, the company closed and on October 24 of that year, they declared bankruptcy.

== Awards ==
Thiel Audio won many awards, including the International Consumer Electronics Show Innovations Design and Engineering Award, which Thiel had received 22 times, and the Image Hi-Fi speaker of the millennium award in 2000. Thiel also won BizRate's coveted "Circle of Excellence" award seven times. Most recently their LifeStream wireless speaker won the 2017 CES Best of Show award in the Connected Home product category.
