= List of Bose home audio products =

Home audio products sold by Bose Corporation are listed below.

== 2.1 channel amplifiers ==
From 1990 until the early 2010s, Bose sold several 2.1 channel audio systems. The systems used two small satellite speakers and a subwoofer. Early versions of the systems used an in-built CD player, followed by a DVD player. Later versions were AV receivers that used external audio sources.

=== CD players ===
The first 2.1 audio system from Bose was the "Lifestyle 10", which was released in 1990. The Lifestyle 10 included a single-disk CD player, an AM/FM radio and "Zone 2" RCA outputs which could be configured to output a different source to the primary speakers.

A 6-disk magazine-style CD changer was introduced in 1996. A touchscreen remote was introduced in 1999.

=== DVD players ===
The first 2.1 audio system from Bose to include a DVD player was the "3-2-1", released in 2001. The "3-2-1 GS" model was introduced in 2003, named for its use of Bose "Gemstones" small speakers, which have two drivers pointing forward and one pointing to the side.

The 3-2-1 was replaced by the "321 Series II" in 2004, which included two small speakers and a subwoofer. The 321 Series II was praised for its performance for movies, but was criticized for its performance with music and for lacking a HDMI connection. The 321 Series II GS had similar outcomes, however it was also criticised for value for money.

An internal hard drive for storing music (in mp3 and wma formats) was introduced in 2005 for the "321 GSX" model.

The "321 Series III" replaced the Series II in 2008, adding an HDMI output connection. A "GSXL" model was introduced with a larger hard drive advertised as having a capacity of 200 hours of music, however the bitrate used is not known.

=== AV receivers ===
The first 2.1 AV receiver system from Bose was the "Freestyle", which was introduced in 2002 and used S/PDIF and RCA inputs. The system used the same speakers as the 3-2-1.

The Freestyle was replaced by the "CineMate" in 2005, which has only RCA connectors and uses the same speakers as the 321 Series II. A fibre optic input was added for the CineMate Series II, which was released in 2009.

The "Lifestyle 235" was released in 2010 and added an AM/FM radio, iPod dock and HDMI inputs.

== 5.1 channel amplifiers ==
From 1994 until the mid-2010s, Bose sold several 5.1 channel audio systems, which used five small satellite speakers and a subwoofer. Early systems used an in-built CD player, followed by a DVD player and later models were AV receivers, which used external audio sources.

=== CD players ===
The first 5.1 audio system from Bose was the "Lifestyle 12", which was released in 1994. The Lifestyle 10 included a single-disk CD player and an AM/FM radio. Beginning in 1996, some models were sold with a 6-disk CD changer. The changer used a magazine, so changing CDs required stopping playback. In 1999, the "Lifestyle 12 Series II" models added a coaxial S/PDIF input.

=== DVD players ===
The first products to include a DVD player were the "Lifestyle 28" and "Lifestyle 35" models, which were released in 2001.

The Series II versions of these products, released in 2004, used a "BoseLink" audio output instead of the previous "Zone 2" RCA outputs. The Lifestyle 38 was one of 22 products to be listed in the Sound and Vision Magazine 2004 Reviewer's Choice Awards. The Lifestyle 48 and Boston Acoustics Avidea 610 won the Home Theatre category in the 2006 AudioVideo International "Hi-Fi Grand Prix Awards".

In 2006, the Series II models were replaced by the Series III models, however the amplifier unit itself was unchanged.

The Series IV version of the DVD-based models were introduced in 2007 and saw HDMI inputs and outputs added to some models.

=== AV receivers ===
The first 5.1 AV receiver from Bose was the 1998 "Companion" model, which used RCA, S-Video and Composite connections. The Companion was one of 100 products listed in Popular Science's 1996 "Best of What's New" article.

In 2007, the "Lifestyle V20" and "Lifestyle V30" products added HDMI and S/PDIF connections.

The "Lifestyle T10" and "Lifestyle T20" models, released in 2010, added a USB audio input. The "Lifestyle V25" and "Lifestyle V35", also released in 2010, added an iPod dock and two USB audio inputs.

== Speaker packages ==
=== Mono ===
==== 2201 ====
The "2201" was released in 1966 and was Bose's first speaker system. It consisted of 22 five-inch drivers and was designed to be located in the corner of a room, using reflections off the walls and floor to disperse the sound. The system included tone controls and a switch to attenuate frequencies below 50 Hz. The 2201 was a market failure and Bose discontinued it after three or four years.

=== Stereo ===
==== 901 ====
The 901 Series, released in 1968, was an unconventional design consisting of two floorstanding speakers and an active equaliser. The equaliser, connected between pre-amplifier output and power amplifier input, effectively flattens the speaker frequency response. Each speaker has nine identical 4.5-inch drivers per channel — one on the front for direct sound, and eight on the rear designed to produce reflected sound.

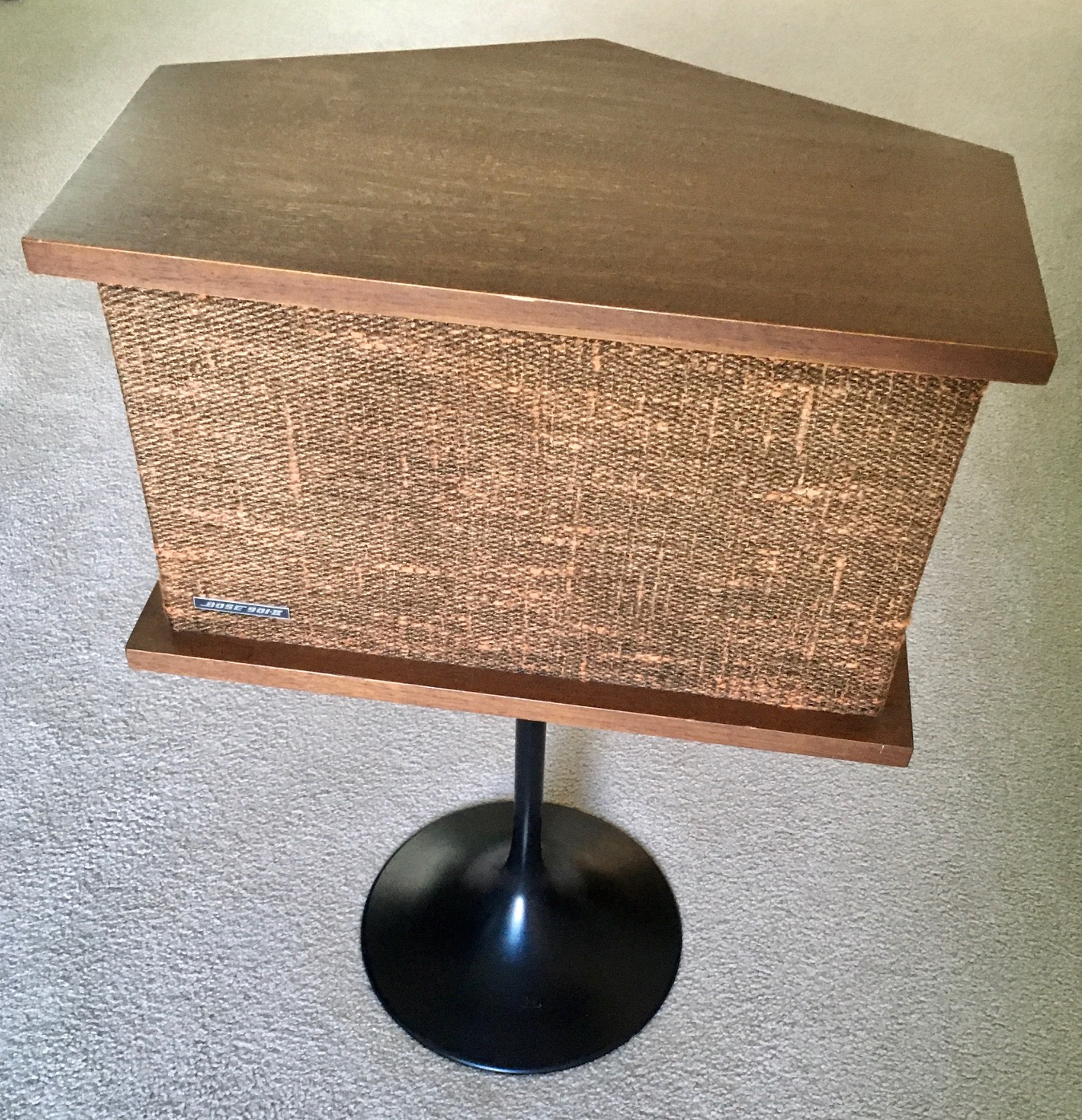
Bose 901 Series II on a black, metal pedestal stand

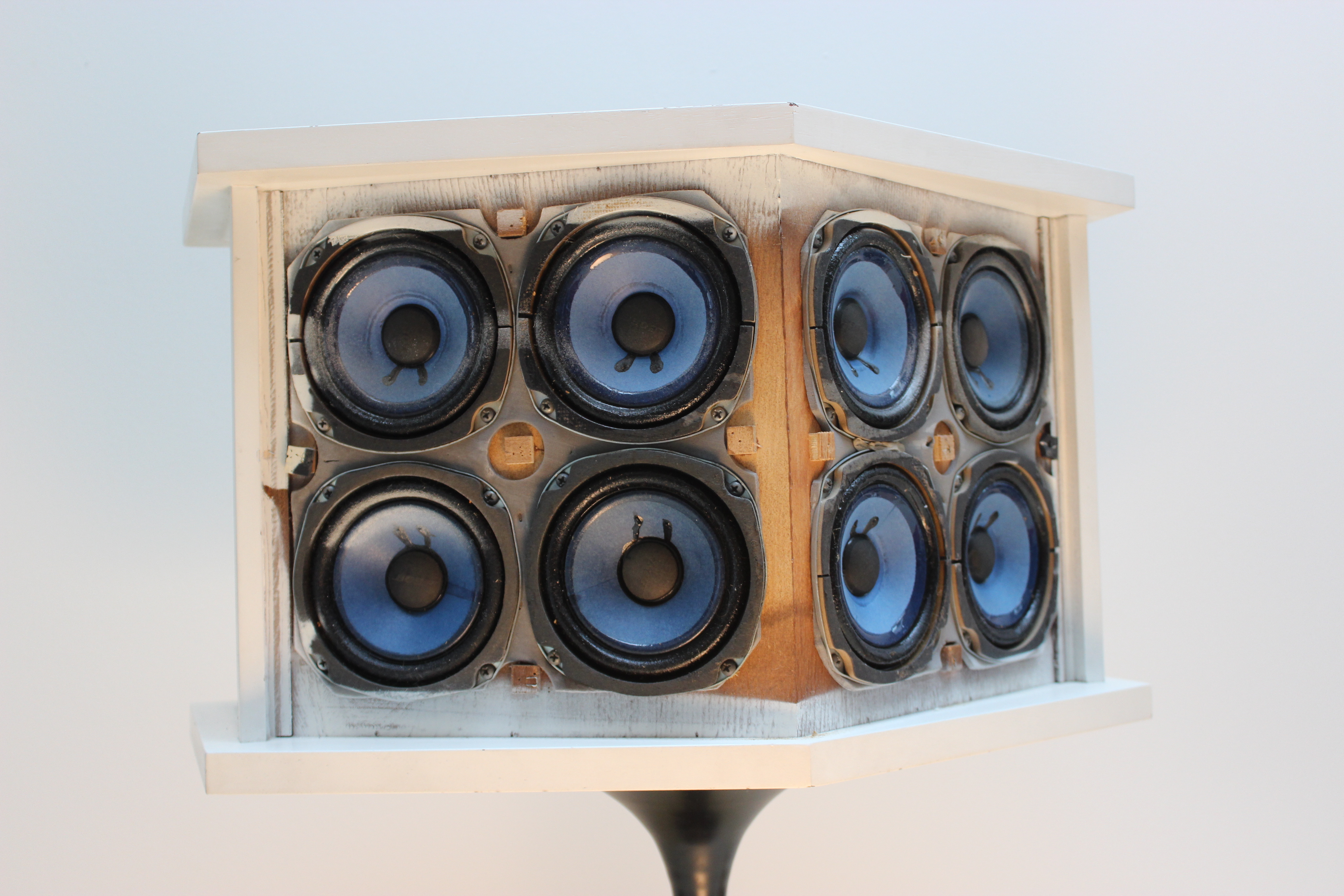
Rear view of speaker with outer fabric removed

The 901 Series was not intended to be used without the included 901 Active Equalizer. The speakers had rubber feet to allow them to stand on flat surfaces; optional metal pedestal stands and ceiling mounts were also available.

It was sold until 2016, when the 901 Series VI was discontinued.

A review of the 901 by Stereophile magazine in 1979 concluded:

If we were to judge the 901 in terms of the best sound available, then, we would say that it produces a more realistic semblance of natural ambience than any other speaker system, but we would characterize it as unexceptional in all other respects. It is ideal for rock enthusiasts to whom sheer sonic impact is of paramount importance, and for classical listeners who want the next best thing to ambient stereo without the cost and the bother of rear-channel add-ons. However, we doubt that the 901 will appeal to perfectionists who have developed a taste for subtleties of detail and timbre.

In the 1990s, Bose manufactured a "Lifestyle 901" system that integrated two 901 speakers, the 901 Active Equalizer, and a Lifestyle stereo receiver that integrated an AM-FM radio tuner and a CD player, as well as a remote control.

==== 301 ====
The "301" bookshelf speakers were released in 1975. The Bose 301 Series II is a direct/reflecting speaker system. It includes “bass effects” through a 8-inch woofer and surround sound effects through its asymmetrical design. Dual frequency crossover network in the Bose 301 Series II improves sound clarity by optimizing output frequencies. The most recent version, the "301 Series V" has been on sale since 2002.

==== 201 ====
The "201" bookshelf speakers were released in 1982. Similar in design to the larger 301 Series, the 201 Series featured smaller drivers (speakers). The most recent version, the "201 Series V" has been on sale since 2015.

==== Acoustimass ====
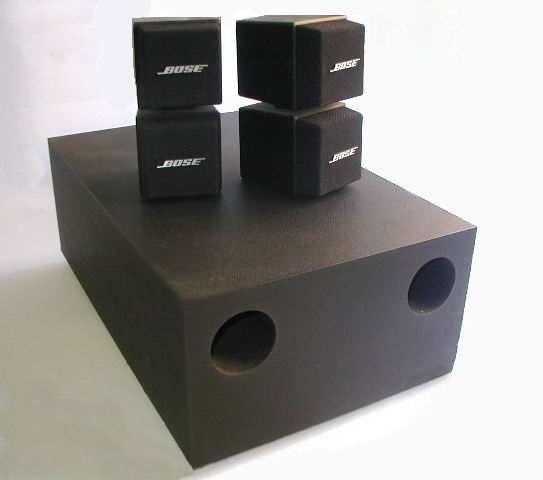
Acoustimass 5 Series I

The "Acoustimass 5" was released in 1987 and consists of a bass module and two "double cube" satellite speakers. This was followed by an "Acoustimass 3" system in 1989, which consisted of two "single cube" satellite speakers and a smaller bass module.

As of July 2019, the Acoustimass 5 currently remains on sale, in the form of the Series V version. The Acoustimass 3 was discontinued in 2016.

The original Acoustimass bass module featured a wooden ported enclosure round port (which later changed to a new cabinet design with a round port) while the current Acoustimass module features a larger, square port (the Acoustimass 3 and 5 systems still use the older-style Acoustimass module). The cube speakers (called "Jewel Cubes") were recently redesigned with a slimmer profile, and are no longer adjustable. New mounting brackets allow the newly designed speakers to mount nearly flush to the wall.

In the past, Bose has manufactured a 6.1-channel Acoustimass system, the Acoustimass 16, which featured five "double cube" satellite speakers, a single center-channel speaker, and an Acoustimass bass module.

=== Surround sound ===
The company's first surround sound speakers were the "Acoustimass 6" &"Acoustimass 10", both released in 1996. Both products were 5.0 passive systems, with the Acoustimass 6 using "single cube" satellite speakers and the Acoustimass 10 using "double cube" satellite speakers.

The "Acoustimass 15" 5.1 is a true 5.1 system was sold from 1998 until 2006 it includes an amplified sub, and the "Acoustimass 16" 6.1 system was sold from 2002 until 2006 also included an additional double cube and is amplified.

=== Computer speakers ===
Bose has manufactured speaker systems for computers since 1987. Some models have a powered subwoofer.

==== Roommate ====
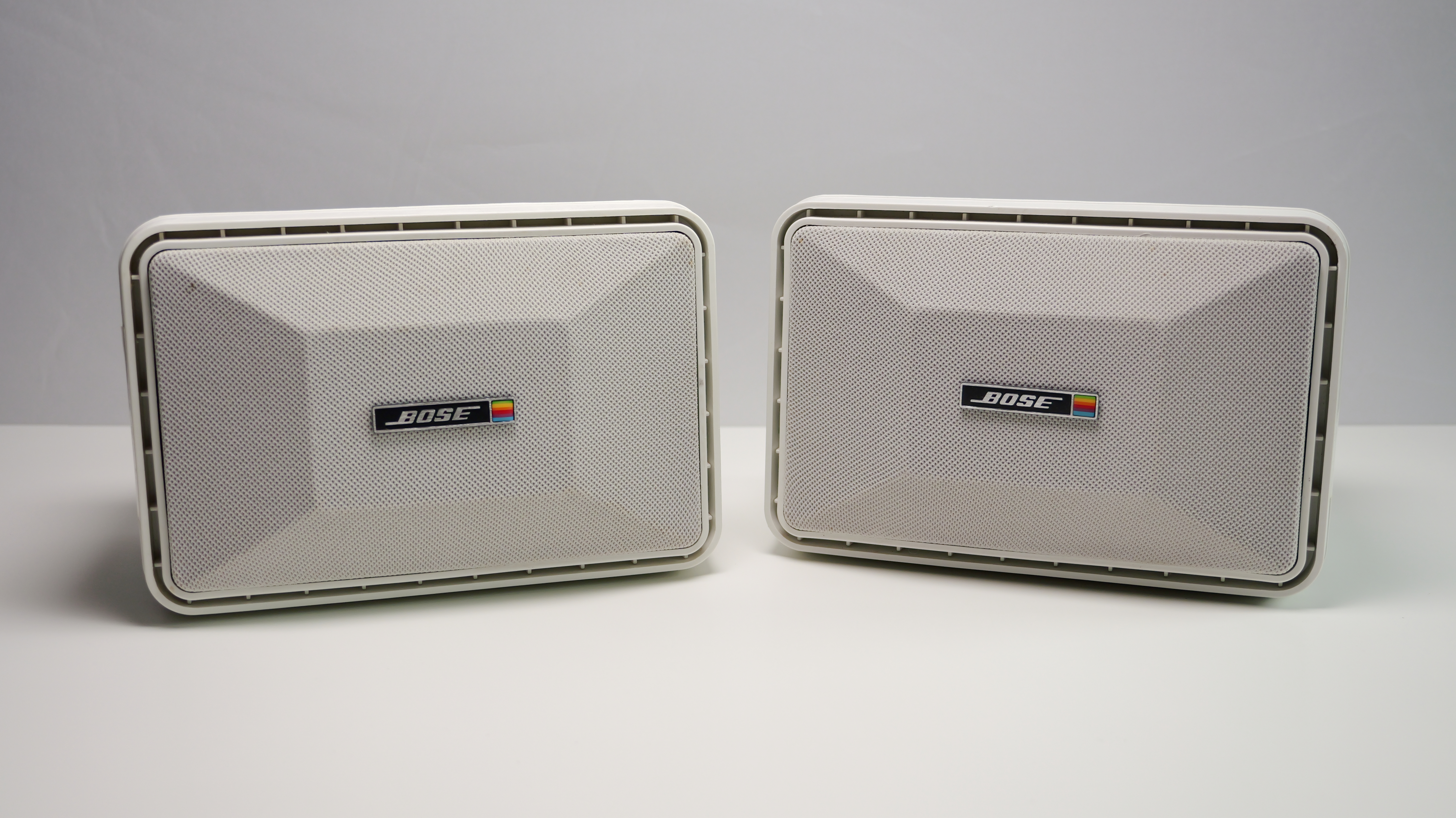
Bose Roommate speakers with rainbow badges reminiscent of Apple's logo

Bose and Apple Computer partnered and made a snow white edition of the Roommate Powered speakers to accompany the new audio features of the Apple IIGS. Original versions of the speakers included Apple's logo on their front badges, alongside Bose's; but as the Beatles' Apple Records lawsuit against Apple continued through the late 1980s, the badge was changed to a square with rainbow stripes. In 1997 Apple again partnered with Bose to create an integrated Bose audio solution for the Twentieth Anniversary Macintosh, this borrowed 2 neodymium drivers from a Lifestyle 20 and a custom base module / power supply.

==== MediaMate ====
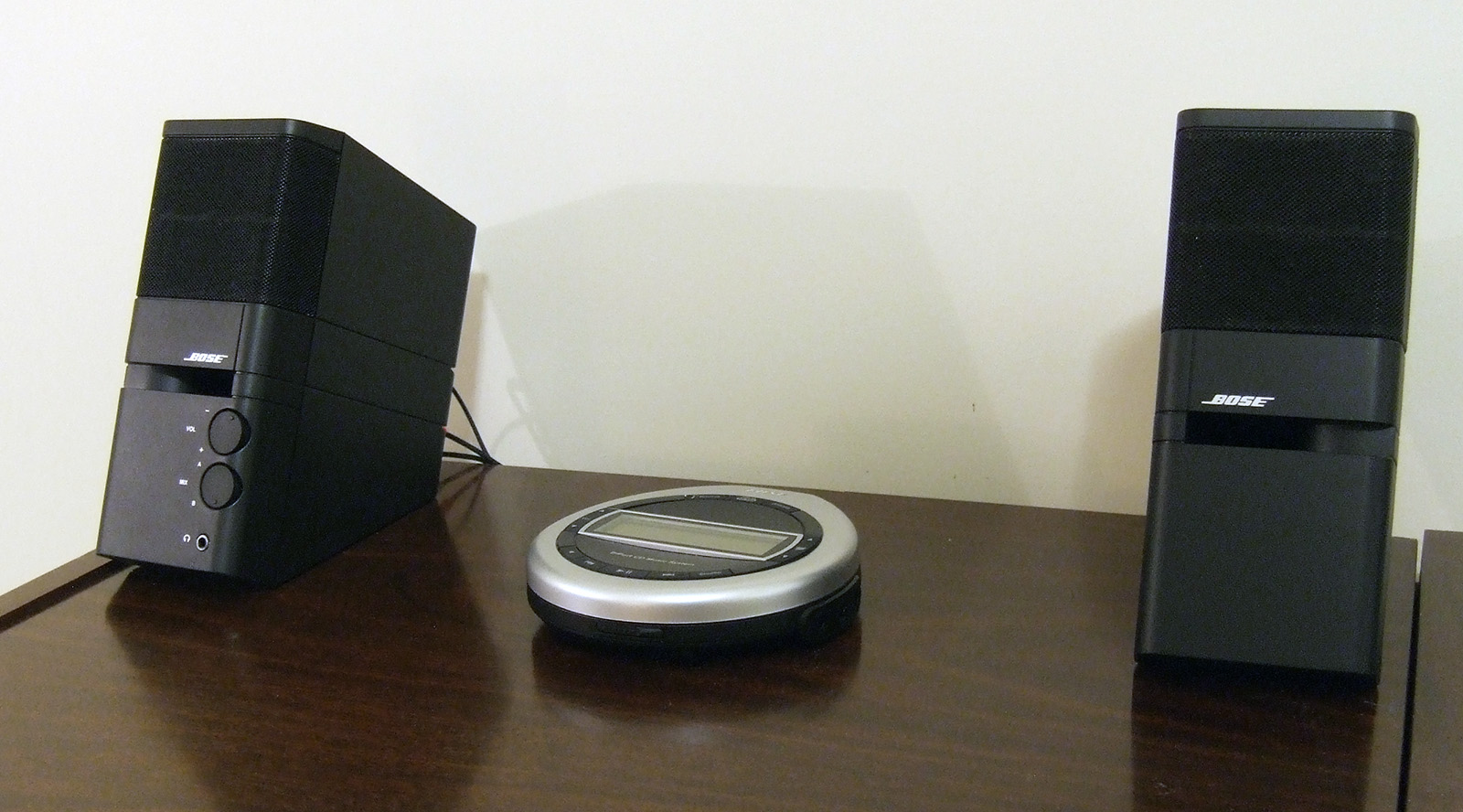
MediaMate speakers (either side of a CD player)

The computer speakers from Bose was the "MediaMate" system, which was released in 1987. The MediaMate included magnetic shielding so that they could be placed near a CRT computer monitor without causing the monitor's image to distort. They had dual inputs and two sources (such as a CD player and a computer game) to be played simultaneously, with a dial to adjust the relative level of the two sources. There is no on/off switch for the MediaMate speakers or any tone controls. Production of MediaMate speakers ended in 2005.

In Japan, the MediaMate was sold as the "MM-1". The MM-1 included an "enhance" function, which basically acted as a tone control. An "MM-2" system was also sold in Japan, which included a subwoofer.

==== Companion 2 ====
The "Companion 2" was released in 2005 as the replacement for the MediaMate. The Companion 2 speakers had two input ports, however (unlike its MediaMate predecessor) there was no control to adjust the level of each source. Virtual surround sound emulation ("TrueSpace Stereo Everywhere") was included.

The "Companion 2 Series II" were introduced in 2006. The appearance changed from round speaker grilles to rectangular speaker grilles.

Compared with the similarly priced M-Audio Studiophile AV20, the Companion 2 speakers were found to have inferior sound quality but the benefit of being able to play two sources simultaneously.

==== Companion 3 ====
The "Companion 3" system was released in 2003 and consisted of two satellite speakers and a subwoofer. Control is via a wired remote. Dual inputs allow two sources to be played simultaneously, however it is not possible to adjust the relative level of each source.

The "Companion 3 Series II" was introduced in 2006. Changes included smaller satellite speakers with similar appearance to the Companion 5 system and the speaker grille on the subwoofer changing from circular to square shaped. Sales of the Companion 3 Series II ceased in 2016.

==== Companion 5 ====
The "Companion 5" system was first listed on Amazon in 2005. It was a 2.1 system consisting of two satellite speakers, a subwoofer, a wired control unit and an inbuilt sound card, which connected to the computer via USB. The subwoofer was very similar to that used in the Companion 3 Series II system, however the Companion 5 used larger satellite speakers.

In Europe and Asia-Pacific, a "Companion 50" version of the system was also produced.

==== Companion 20 ====
The "Companion 20" system was released in 2011 and consists of two satellite speakers and a wired control unit (called "control pod" by Bose). It was discontinued in 2021.

==== Computer MusicMonitor ====
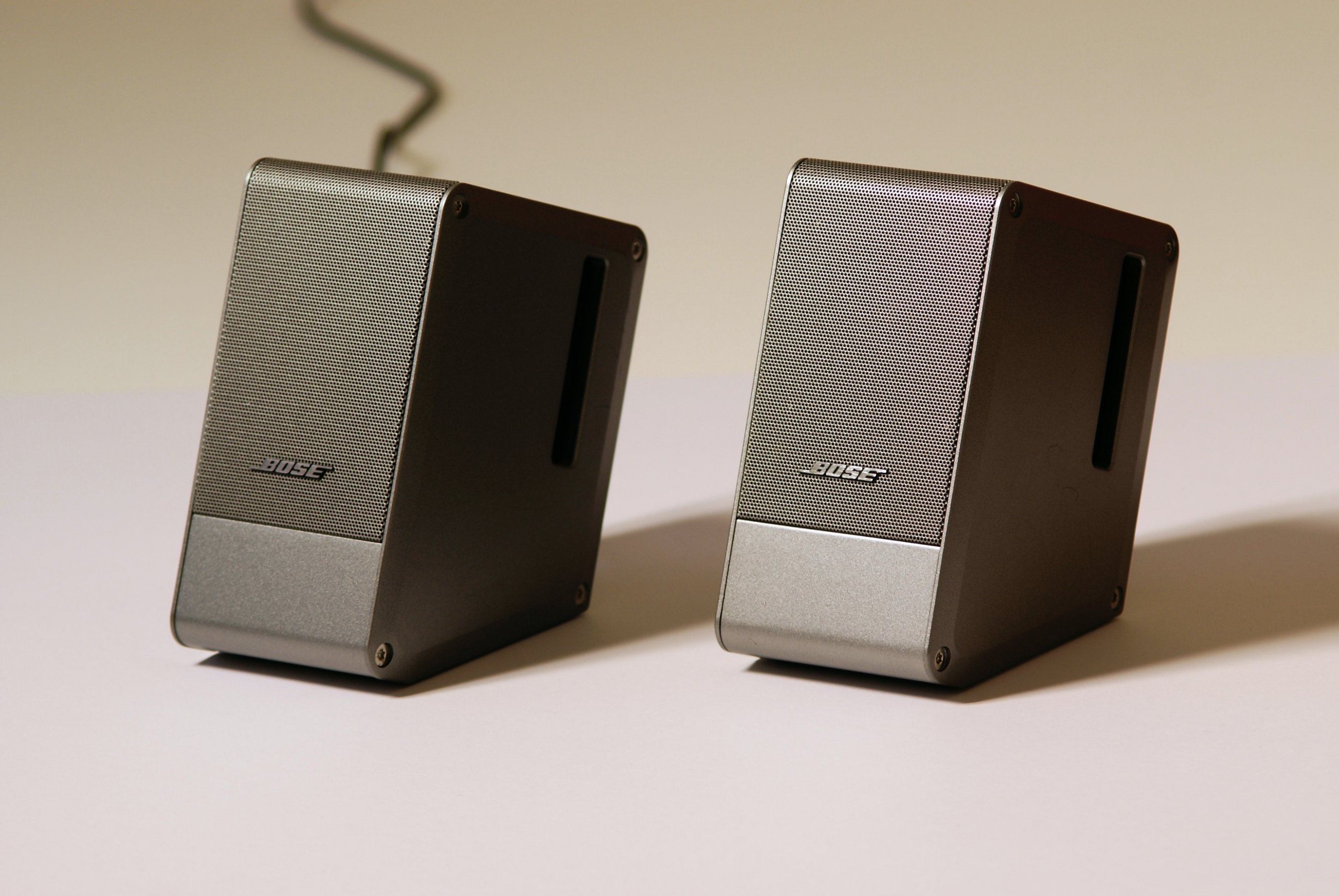
Computer MusicMonitor

The "Computer MusicMonitor" system was sold from 2007 and consisted of two satellite speakers and a remote control. The Computer MusicMonitor system was judged to have a convenient small size, but sub-standard audio quality for the price. Sales of the Computer MusicMonitor ended in 2017.

In Japan, a similar model called the "Micro Music Monitor (M3)" was released in 2006. The M3 was able to operate on battery power (unlike the Computer MusicMonitor).

=== Environmental Series ===
First introduced in 1994, the 111 Series Environmental speaker was an indoor/outdoor version of the Model 101 Music Monitor, which was introduced in the late 1980s. The 111 was replaced by the 151, which featured a similar design, but a revised metal speaker grille.

In 2004, the 151 was replaced by the 151 SE, which now featured "Direct/Reflecting" speaker technology for wider coverage, as well as the versatility of vertical or horizontal mounting using the included flushmount brackets.

Also introduced in 2004, the 251 Series Environmental Speaker was a larger version of the 151 Series.

The 131 Marine Speaker was a flushmount speaker that was meant to be installed on a boat, and could be connected to the boat's receiver.

The Freespace 51 is an "in-ground" landscape speaker that features omnidirectional, 360-degree sound projection, as well as a bass port. The speakers are designed to blend in with outdoor landscaping, and the wiring features "Posi-Tap" connectors, so that speaker wiring can be hidden underground.

=== "Virtually Invisible" Series ===
In the early 2000s, Bose introduced the 191 Virtually Invisible in-ceiling/in-wall loudspeakers. These speakers included both round and rectangular speaker grilles that could be installed according to the homeowner's preferences.

The 191 has since been replaced by the "x91 Series" Virtually Invisible in-ceiling/in-wall loudspeakers (which include the 591, 691, 791, and 891 loudspeakers). Unlike the 191, which included two different styles of speaker grilles, the x91 Series included different models made specifically for in-wall or in-ceiling installation.

The speaker grilles can easily be painted to match the homeowner's decor, and the 191 Series could also included in a line of "installed" surround-sound systems in new home construction.

== Music Systems ==
Bose Wave Music has been a long running range of home audio systems. The 3rd generation was released in 2012.
