= List of Bose shelf stereos =

Shelf stereo products sold by Bose Corporation are listed below.

== Wave systems ==
The Wave systems use a folded waveguide (a series of passages from the speaker driver to the speaker grill). The waveguide is claimed to improve low-frequency sound "from a small enclosure by guiding air through two 26” folded wave guides".

=== Acoustic Wave Music System ===
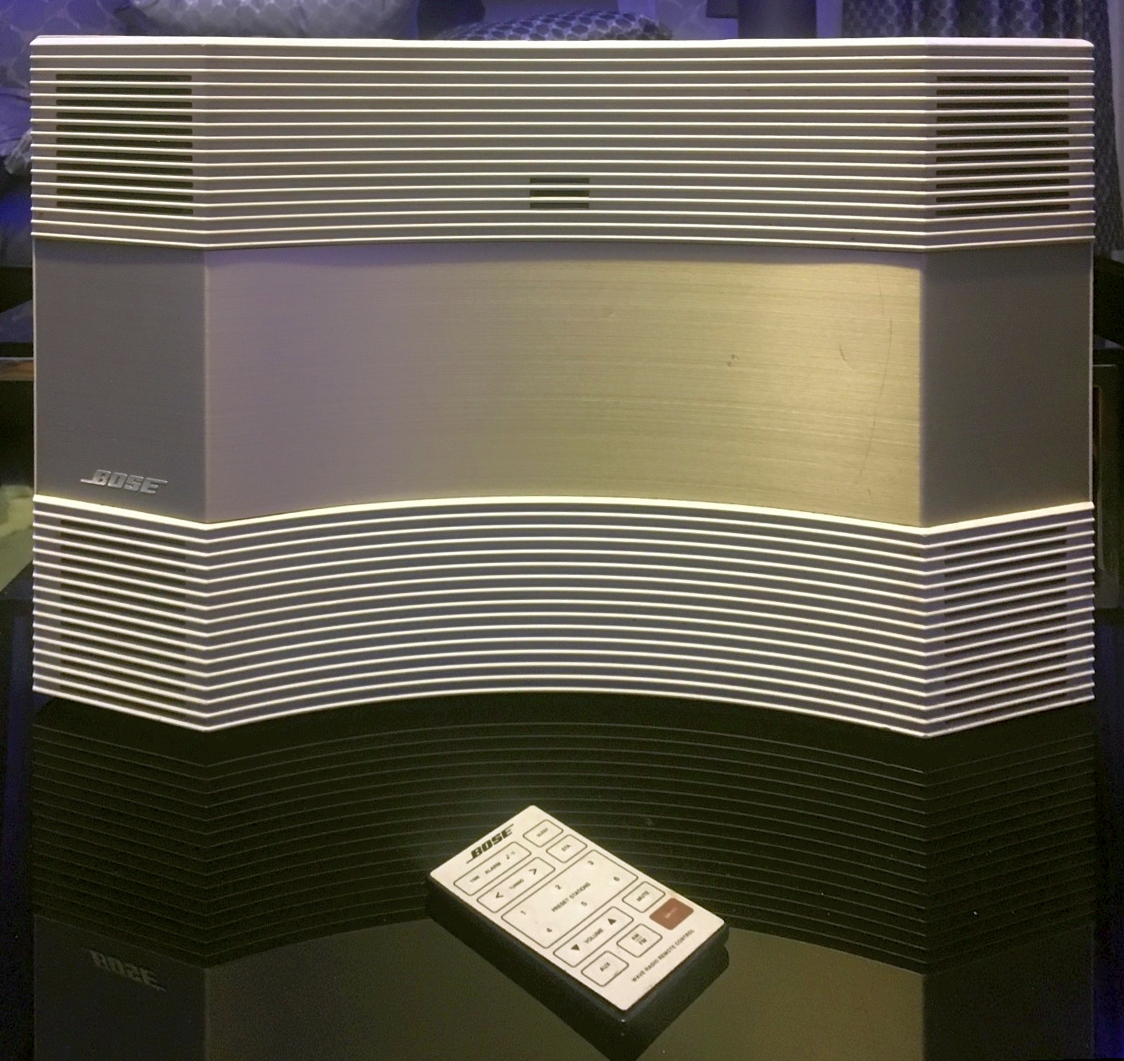
Bose Acoustic Wave Music System CD-3000 with CD player and FM radio

The first "Wave" product was the "Acoustic Wave Music System" (AWMS-1), which was a tabletop mini-hifi system that was introduced in 1984. The AWMS-1 consisted of an AM/FM radio, cassette player, two 2-inch tweeters, and a four-inch woofer. In 1987, Amar Bose and William Short won the Inventor of the Year award from Intellectual Property Owners for the waveguide loudspeaker system. A model with a CD player was added in 1992.

The "Acoustic Wave Music System II" was released in 2006 and added MP3 CD playback, a "Boselink" port and a headphone jack. This system was judged to be expensive and lacking in performance and features compared to its competitors. The line of Acoustic Wave Music System products was discontinued in 2017.

=== Wave Radio ===
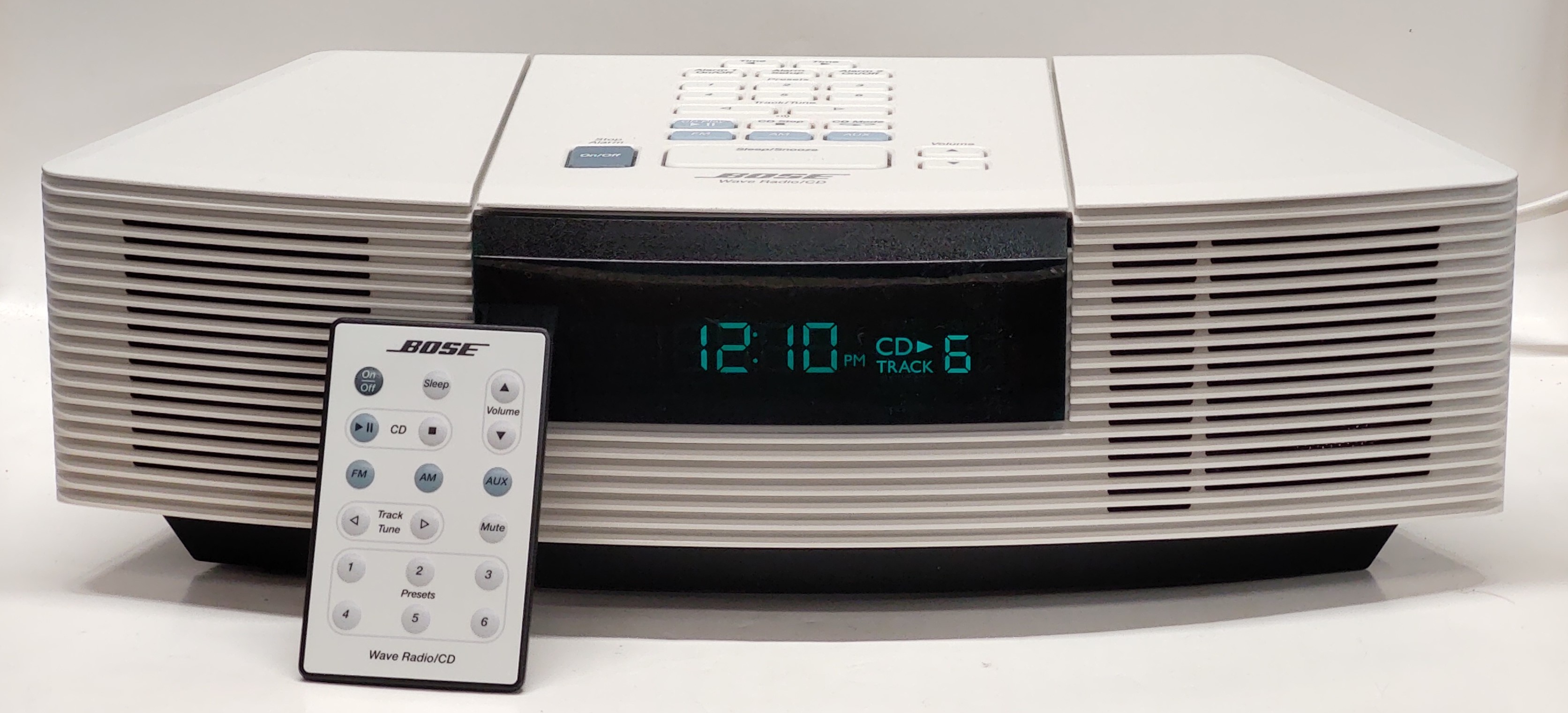
Wave Radio/CD

The "Wave Radio" (which has since become known as "Wave Radio I") was an AM/FM clock radio that was introduced in 1993. It was smaller than the Acoustic Wave Music System and used two 2.5-inch speakers. A "Wave Radio/CD" model was introduced in 1998 and was essentially a Wave Radio I with a CD player. The end of the waveguides were tapered by 2%. Unlike the Acoustic Wave, the Wave Radio could be used as an alarm clock radio, and featured two independent alarms, which could be set to A/M or F/M radio, a buzzer, or a device plugged into the auxiliary input.

The "Wave Radio II" was introduced in 2005 and was based on the Wave Music System without the CD player. It used a dual tapered waveguide and revised speakers. The "Wave Radio III", introduced in 2007, was identical in appearance to the Wave Radio II and added Radio Data System (RDS) and a large snooze button on top of the unit.

The "Wave Radio IV", introduced in 2015, had a significantly different appearance and controls to its predecessor, and dual alarms. Production of the Wave Radio IV ceased in 2017.

=== Wave Music System ===
The "Wave Music System" was released in 2004 as a replacement for the Wave Radio/CD. It had revised speaker waveguides, a 66 cm (26 in) tapered waveguide for each speaker, and could play MP3 format CDs. The "Wave Music System II", released in 2005, was nearly identical to its predecessor, and the 2012 "Wave Music System III" added Radio Data System (RDS) and a large snooze button to the top of the unit. Accessories included a CD changer (released in 2005) and an iPod dock (released in 2006).

The "Wave Music System – SoundLink" was released in 2009, which used a Bluetooth USB adaptor to stream audio from a computer to the Wave Music System and send basic commands (play/pause and skip) from the Wave's remote to iTunes and Windows Media Player software. The SoundLink functioned as the computer's sound card, therefore it disabled the computer's speakers. Connection was via a "Boselink" port A "Wave SoundLink" accessory was also introduced for the Wave Music System II, which added Bluetooth streaming to existing units.

The "Wave Music System IV", introduced in 2015, had a significantly different appearance and controls to its predecessor, and dual alarms. A "Soundtouch" version was introduced, which added Wi-Fi streaming as an audio source.

=== Wave/PC ===
The "Bose Wave/PC" was released in 2001 as a device to play mp3 files and digital radio from a Windows PC. It was based on the Wave Radio, sent commands to the computer using a serial data cable and received audio via an analogue output from the computer's sound card. Later models used a USB for transferring both commands and audio. The system was reviewed to have good sound quality, however it was criticised for its high price and difficulty in transferring commonly used files types such as WMA.

== SoundDocks ==
SoundDock series I

The "SoundDock" was an audio dock for Apple iPods and iPhones that was produced from 2004 until 2017.

The first generation SoundDock was introduced in 2004. It included a remote control and allowed all of the iPods controls to be used while docked. The SoundDock could charge an iPod while docked, however the lack of a direct input or pass-through Dock Connector means that the iPod cannot sync while being used in the SoundDock. The SoundDock was the 2006 winner of the MacUser Reader's Award for Audio of the Year. The series I was discontinued in 2008, however it was re-introduced in 2009 as the "SoundDock series I version 2" model. The version 2 model was compatible with iPhones and charged via USB.

The "SoundDock Portable" was released in 2007 and included a battery which provided a running time of 3 to 14 hours, depending on bass and listening volume. Compared to the SoundDock series I, the Portable had an external 3.5 input and the remote control could change between playlists.

The "SoundDock Series II" was introduced in 2008. Changes included iPhone compatibility, a 3.5 mm input for external sources and playback hardware shared with SoundDock Portable.

The "SoundDock 10" was released in 2009. It was compatible with iPhones, included a remote control and could receive music via Bluetooth if an additional adaptor was purchased. As compared to other Soundocks, the 10 added a large bass woofer significantly increasing bass performance, weight, size and price of the units. The power supply is built in while other Soundocks in the line up uses external power supplies. Due to the use of low end Chinese capacitors along with the internal captivated heat, unit would often die due to failed capacitors.

The "SoundDock Series III" was released in 2012 and included a lightning connector. A reviewer noted a "rich sound" but also the lack of controls to adjust the tone.

Comparison of functions
Version	Dock Connection	AUX In	Battery	iPhone Certified	Video Out
SoundDock series I	FireWire	No	No	No	No
SoundDock series I v2	USB	No	No	Yes	No
SoundDock series II	USB	Yes	No	Yes	No
SoundDock series III	Lightning	Yes	No	Yes	No
SoundDock Portable	USB	Yes	Yes	No	No
SoundDock Portable v2	USB	Yes	Yes	Yes	No
SoundDock 10	USB	Yes	No	Yes	Yes

== SoundLink Air ==
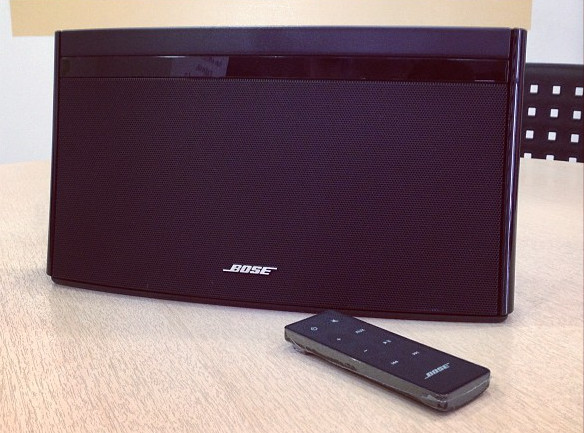
SoundLink Air

The "SoundLink Air" was released in 2012 and used solely with Apple devices, since it used Apple's AirPlay protocol instead of Bluetooth. Unlike other SoundLink devices, the Air was mains powered, although a battery accessory was an optional extra.

Reviewers praised the sound quality and build quality, but commented that competing systems may offer a better experience, and criticised the price of the optional battery and the bulkiness of the wall-plug adaptor. Sales of the SoundLink Air ended in 2014.

=== Home Speaker Series ===
In 2018, Bose introduced its Home Speaker lineup of connected smart speakers, which integrate the same features of its SoundTouch Wi-Fi and Bluetooth enabled speakers for streaming music services, but also include Amazon Alexa and Google Assistant integration and integrated microphones. The cases on all Home Speaker models are made from aluminum, and feature touch-sensitive controls on the top of the speakers for virtual assistant activation, microphone on/off, auxiliary input mode, volume, play/pause, Bluetooth, and six preset "stations".

The Home Speaker 300 is the smallest offering in the Home Speaker Series, featuring smaller drivers (speakers), allowing for excellent sound quality from a single speaker.

The Home Speaker 500 is the flagship model in the Home Speaker Series, featuring larger drivers (speakers), and more room-filling sound. The 500 also features a color LCD that is used strictly for song information (similar to the screens on early Apple iPod models).

Bose also manufactures a Home Speaker 450 that is essentially identical to the Home Speaker 500, but lacks the integrated LCD.
