= Harman Kardon =

Manufacturer of audio equipment

Harman / Kardon
- Type: Division
- Industry: Electronics
- Founded: 1953; 73 years ago
- Founders: Sidney Harman; Bernard Kardon
- Headquarters: Stamford, Connecticut, U.S
- Products: Audio equipment
- Parent: Harman International
- Website: harmankardon.com

Harman Kardon (stylized as harman/kardon) is a brand owned by Harman International Industries, which is a wholly owned subsidiary of Samsung Electronics. Harman Kardon was originally founded in Westbury, New York, in 1953 by business partners Sidney Harman and Bernard Kardon.

The company is focused on three audio equipment business segments – Automotive, Consumer and Professional – offering products under company-owned brand names including AKG, AMX, Arcam, Bang & Olufsen, Becker, Boston Acoustics, Bowers & Wilkins, BSS Audio, Classé, Crown, dbx, Definitive Technology, Denon, DigiTech, Harman Kardon, HEOS, Infinity, JBL, Lexicon, Mark Levinson, Marantz, Martin, Polk Audio, Revel, Soundcraft and Studer.

HARMAN International corporate customers include Apple, Audi, BMW, Cadillac, Ford, Genesis, Google, Hyundai, Kia, Lexus, Lincoln, Mercedes-Benz, Ram Trucks, Toyota and Volkswagen.

As of June 30, 2007, the company held 1,885 trademark registrations and 294 pending trademark applications around the world. The company also held 1,695 United States and foreign patents and 2,172 pending patent applications covering various audio, infotainment and software products.

== History ==
=== Company founders ===
After graduating from college, Sidney Harman's first job was at the David Bogen Company as an engineer where he designed public-address systems. During his 14-year tenure at Bogen, Harman moved from engineer to sales manager. By the 1950s, he was general manager of the firm.

Harman wanted Bogen to develop an improved audio system for American consumers. Bogen was not interested so Harman resigned in 1953, taking his boss, Bogen's chief designer Bernard Kardon (January 8, 1914 – April 14, 1993) with him. Naming their new company Harman/Kardon Inc., each invested $5,000 (equivalent to $60,168 in 2025) in capital and opened a production facility in Westbury, New York.

=== First products ===
Harman Kardon designed and produced some of the first high fidelity audio products in the 1950s. The company's first product was an FM tuner.

Early integrated receivers (with a tuner, preamplifier and power amplifier) were an attempt to create, improve and produce high fidelity performance in a single unit. Integrated receivers were not a novel concept as Scott Radio Laboratories had manufactured such items in the late 1930s.

One year after its founding, in 1954 Harman Kardon introduced their first products, the 7 tube A-100 AM - FM tuner featuring automatic frequency control, priced at $70.50 (equivalent to $845 in 2025) and the Festival D-1000 receiver, the world's first integrated hi-fi receiver priced at $189.50 (equivalent to $2,272 in 2025).

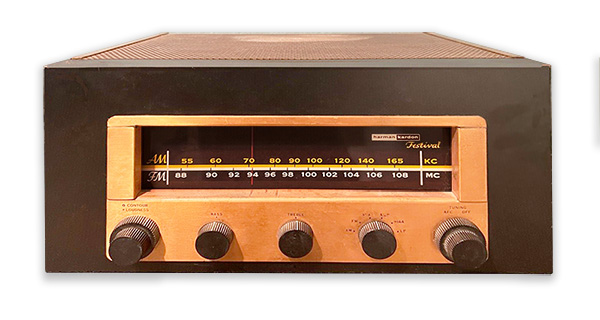
Harman Kardon Festival D-1000 receiver, c. 1954

Advertised as having "all the critical electronic elements of a deluxe high-fidelity system on one compact, controlled chassis", the unit included a wide bandwidth FM radio tuner, a pre-amplifier and 20-watt amplifier with automatic loudness control all in a complete chassis.

The partners had created an advanced audio receiver that could be used to play radio programs and records at home with high audio fidelity by simply attaching speakers. Listeners were amazed. “We knocked the hell out of them; they were trembling with Shostakovich’s Fifth” Harman said. “Nobody had heard anything like that in his living room”, Harman recalled.

The D-1000 was one of the world's first AM/FM compact Hi-Fi receivers, and a forerunner to today's integrated receivers. The monaural unit was aimed to introduce non-technical consumers to high fidelity and combined many now-familiar features such as a tuner, component control unit and amplifier in a single chassis. The shape, form function and size of the D-1000 was a forerunner of the modern integrated receiver. Early Harman Kardon Hi-Fi equipment can be identified by a distinctive design of a copper plated chassis with a copper and black color scheme for panels and enclosures.

By 1956 Harman Kardon was worth $600,000 (equivalent to $7,105,263 in 2025). By 1957 the company offered a wide range of audio equipment, including console receiver units, stand alone tuners, amplifiers and a number of integrated receivers in varying levels of output wattage and features, all within three price ranges - the "Standard", the "Deluxe" and the "Custom" lines. The company began offering an unconditional one year guarantee on parts and labor on all Harman Kardon equipment.

=== Kardon retires ===
Kardon retired in 1957. Harman steadily grew the company into a consumer audio juggernaut in the home, professional and automotive markets producing speakers, amplifiers, noise-reduction devices, video and navigation equipment, voice-activated telephones, climate controls and home theater systems.

=== Continued innovation ===
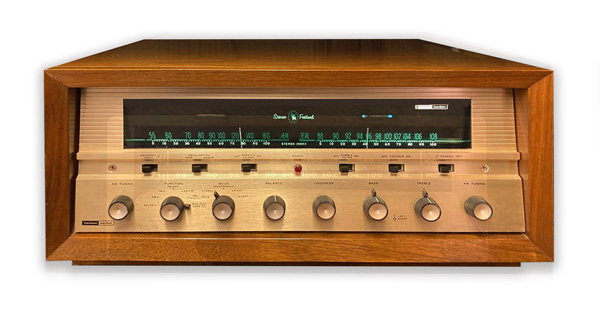
Harman Kardon Festival TA-230 receiver, c. 1958

In 1958 Harman introduced the Festival TA-230, the first high fidelity simulcast stereo receiver, once again aimed at non-technical users with the intention of making high-fidelity stereo widely available. Stereo sound was achieved by using one channel from the AM band, and one channel from the FM band. This early form of stereophonic reception was called simulcast stereo.

Early FM broadcast signals did not have the stereo carrier (pilot) signal that carried the stereo left and right channels. In 1959, two years before the FCC formally approved FM multiplex stereo broadcasting, Harman Kardon introduced the MA-250 FM multiplex adapter unit, designed to fit into the Ode T-250 and the Lyric F-250 tuners. When installed, the tuners were fully functioning multiplex tuners.

In February 1959 Harman Kardon advertised their 24 watt A-224 stereo amplifier and the T-224 am/fm tuner were "the largest selling stereo amplifier and tuner in America".

In 1959, Harman Kardon marketed the Citation II, an early ultra wideband stereophonic tube amplifier. It featured 60 watts/channel output with a frequency response of 18–60,000 Hz at 20 watt output. The company promoted their philosophy of designing high fidelity sound using amplifiers that provided widest possible audio bandwidth. Although the human ear's highest audible range is around 20,000 Hz, the full range of sound goes beyond that with harmonics and overtones that may be beyond the hearing range of the human ear. These harmonics interact with other frequencies to produce audible secondary sounds or interference.

In 1969 Harman bought the major speaker manufacturer JBL. In 1970 Harman Kardon introduce the CAD5, the world's first stereophonic cassette recording deck with Dolby B-type noise reduction.

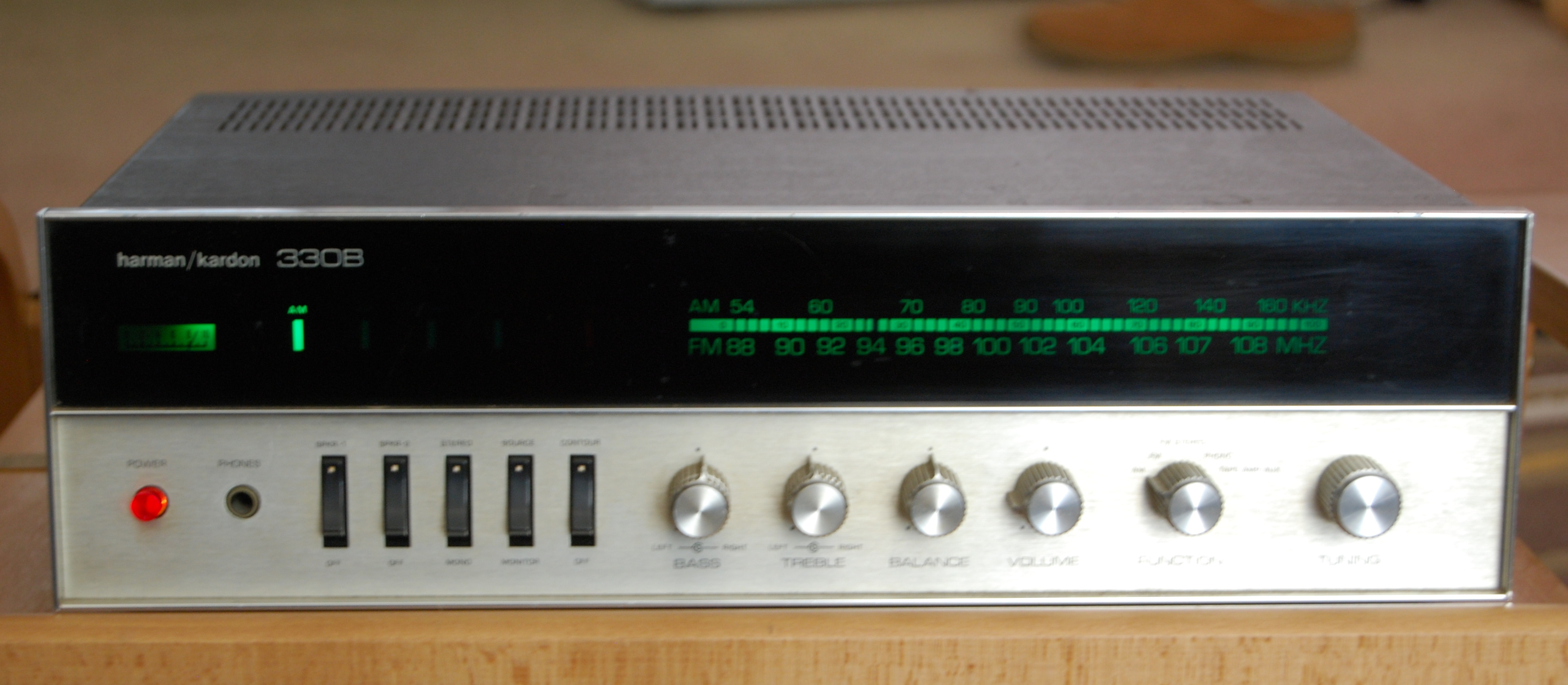
Stereo-Receiver, 1970s

=== Harman sells company ===
In 1977 Harman accepted an appointment in the Carter administration as Under Secretary of the United States Department of Commerce. Then US law required appointees to have no direct business interests in day-to-day activities. When Harman took office in 1976, he sold his company to conglomerate Beatrice Foods for $100 million to avoid a conflict of interest. Beatrice promptly sold many portions of the company, including the original Harman Kardon division, and by 1980 only 60% of the original company remained.

=== Harman repurchases company ===
After the Carter presidency, Harman sought to regain ownership of Harman International. In 1980 he purchased Harman International from Beatrice Foods for $55 million. However, the receiver group was not included in the purchase because Beatrice Foods had previously sold the group to the Japanese company Shin-Shirasuna. The Harman Kardon receiver group was the heart of Harman International, and in 1985 Harman purchased the receiver group and returned the company to its pre-1976 form.

By 1991 Harman International was actually a group of loosely related companies, each selling to separate groups of audiophiles loyal to subsidiary brands like JBL, Infinity or Harman International's other brands. The inefficient corporate structure stretched across 21 divisions. Harman has merged them into five units, eliminating any duplicated departments—such as accounting—for each division. The savings allowed Harman to increase marketing and focus on sales in mass-merchandise stores. The changes worked. Harman International profits dramatically increased from a $19.8 million loss on sales of $587 million in fiscal 1991 to a $3.5 million profit on sales of $605 million in fiscal 1992.

1980 brought the introduction of the Citation XX high-current amplifier, which provided quicker response to large signal transitions from the power amplifier to the speakers. The Citation XX amplifier was called "the world's best-sounding power amplifier" by the editors of The Audio Critic magazine. The amplifier was designed by Finnish engineer Matti Otala who discovered transient intermodulation distortion (TIM) in 1970 and worked to mitigate its effects in the following years. The Citation XX was a project to get the best possible measurements of output signals, and the best perceived sound. The Citation preamp was available in kit form and assembled. A record player with tangential pick-up arm Rabco was released in 1980, too.

From 1999 to 2007, Harman Kardon worked to develop digital processing for audio products. In 1999 the company introduced the CDR-2 compact disc recorder, the first with 4X high speed dubbing. In 2000, Harman Kardon produced the AVR-7000 audio-video receiver, which was able to decode and process HDCD.

Harman retired in 2007 at the age of 88. At that time he hired technology executive Dinesh Paliwal to succeed him as CEO.

On March 11, 2017, Samsung Electronics announced the acquisition of Harman for a reported purchase price of US$8 billion. Harman makes high fidelity audio products under many brand names such as AKG, AMX, Becker, Crown, Harman Kardon, Infinity, JBL, Lexicon, dbx, DigiTech, Mark Levinson, Martin, Revel, Soundcraft, Studer, Arcam, Bang & Olufsen and BSS Audio.

In May 2025, Harman agreed to the acquisition of Bowers & Wilkins, Marantz, Denon, Polk Audio, Definitive Technology, Classé, HEOS and Boston Acoustics as Masimo sells its consumer audio business.

== Other products ==
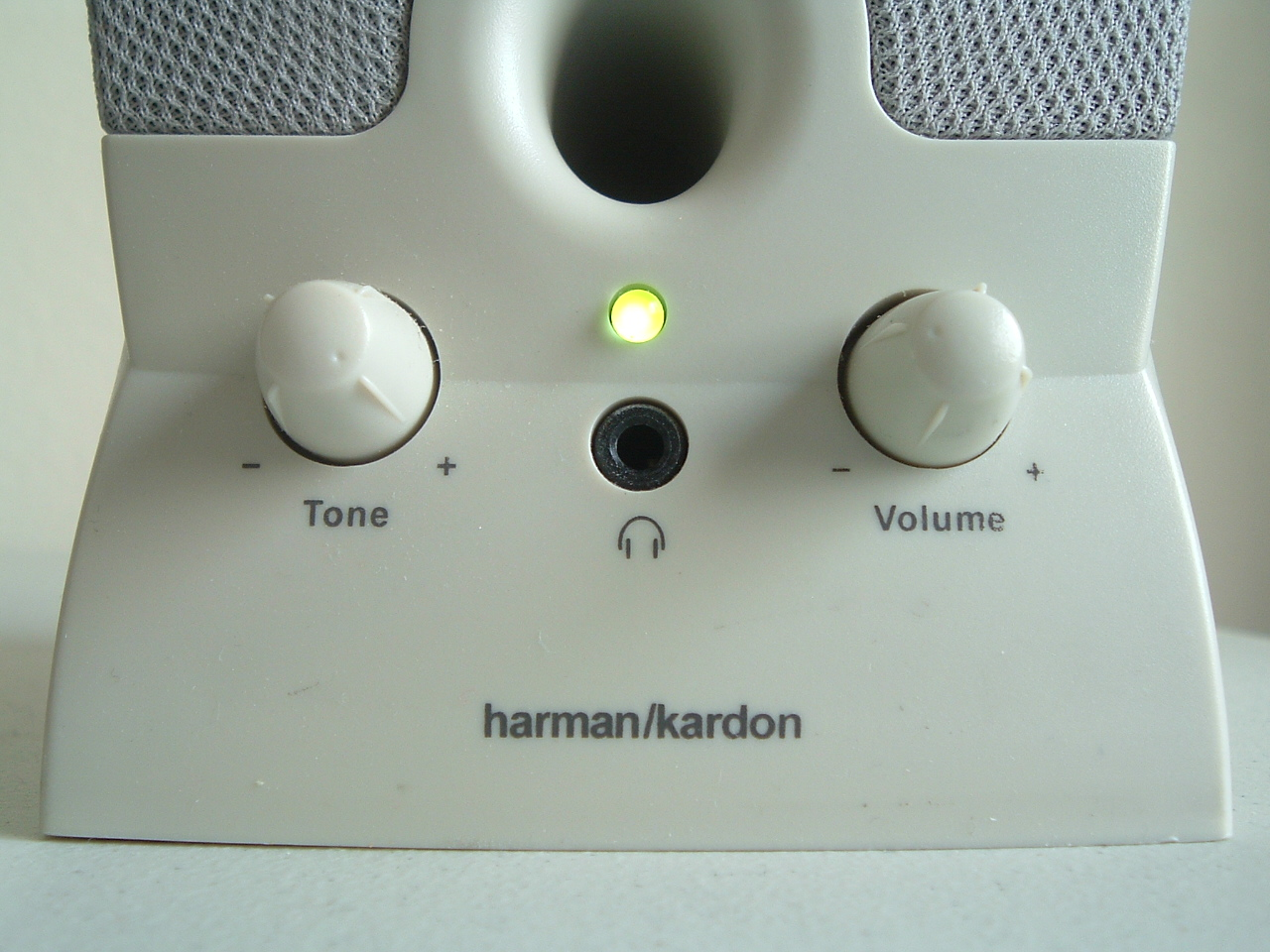
A Harman Kardon PC speaker

=== SoundSticks ===
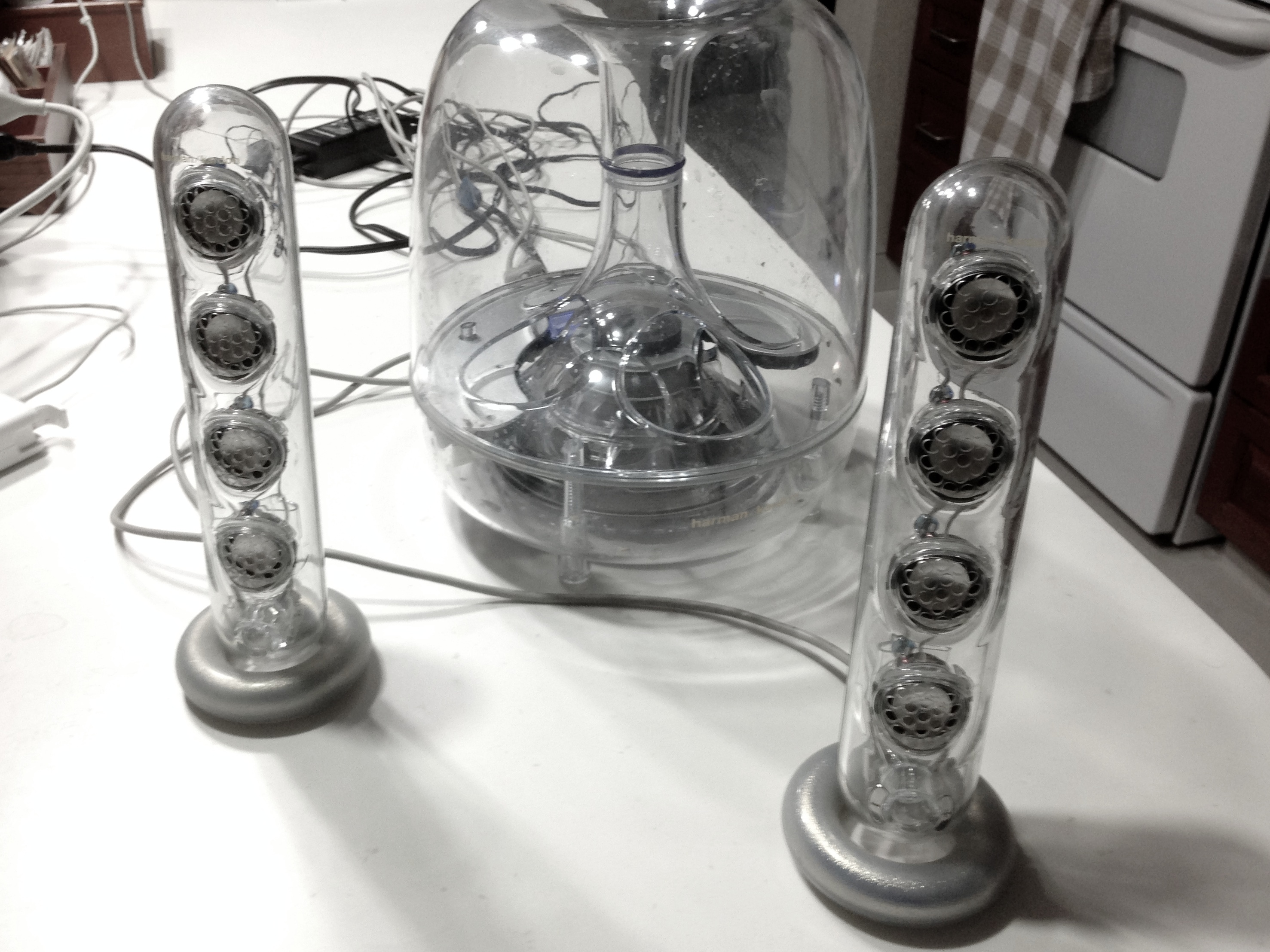
Harman Kardon Soundsticks

The Harman Kardon iSub 2000 Subwoofer and SoundSticks were introduced at the July 2000 Macworld expo. Harman Kardon partnered with Apple to design and manufacture these products.

Apple did the industrial design and mechanical engineering to have the product fit into the Apple product family. This product won an Industrial Design Excellence Awards gold award and was featured on the cover of I.D. magazine. The SoundSticks II were a minor upgrade, with the addition of capacitive volume control buttons and a 3.5 mm mini-jack input replacing the previous USB input. The SoundSticks III were a further update changing the styling slightly using black highlights and white lighting to match the new iMacs, instead of green and blue of the original SoundSticks and the SoundSticks II. The Soundsticks Wireless introduced the capability to accept Bluetooth inputs. However, it retains the wires between the speakers.

=== Car audio ===
Harman Kardon supplies audio equipment to several vehicle manufacturers including Alfa Romeo, BMW, Dodge, Hyundai, Kia, Mahindra & Mahindra, Mercedes-Benz, Mini, Subaru, Volvo and Volkswagen.

== Laptop computer speakers ==
=== Computer speakers ===
Harman Kardon has made desktop computer speakers. Harman Kardon has also made laptop speakers, which have been used in certain models of Toshiba, Acer notebooks, Asus laptops, Apple iMacs and Huawei's M5 tablets. A pair of Harman Kardon transparent spherical speakers, along with the Apple G4 Mac Cube for which they were designed and produced from 2000 to 2001, are housed in the permanent collection of New York's Museum of Modern Art.

=== Smart speakers ===
In 2017, Harman Kardon released a smart speaker, powered by the Microsoft Cortana virtual assistant, called Invoke. In August 2018, Harman Kardon announced the Citation 500, a US$600 smart speaker running the Google Assistant. In 2021, Harman Kardon has collaborated with Xiaomi for its newest smartphones, the Xiaomi Mi 11 series are the first smartphones to feature a dual speaker setup tuned by Harman Kardon.

== Equipment photo gallery ==
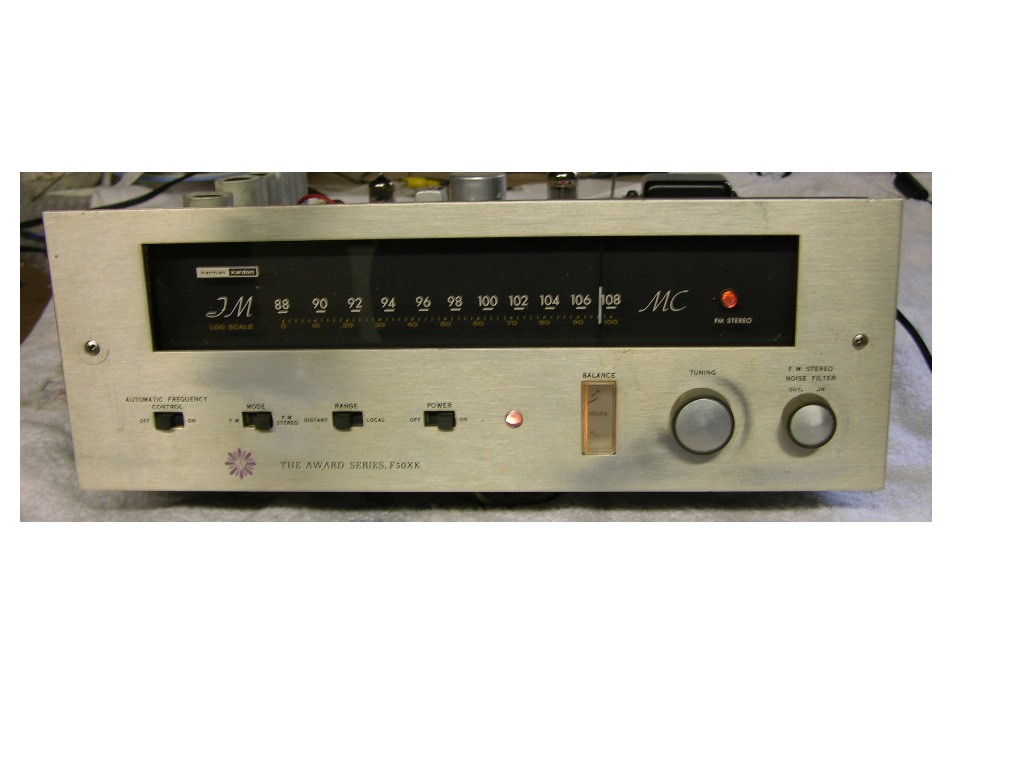
Harman Kardon F50-XK Tube FM Stereo Multiplex Tuner

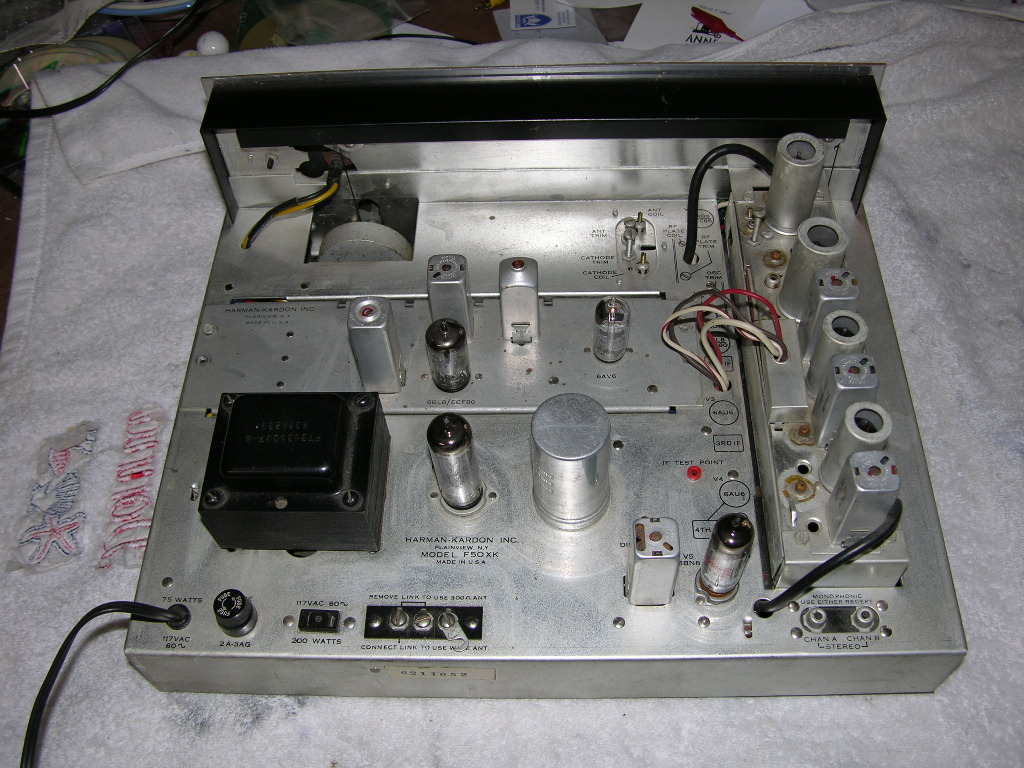
Harman Kardon F50-XK Tube FM Stereo Multiplex Tuner (top view)

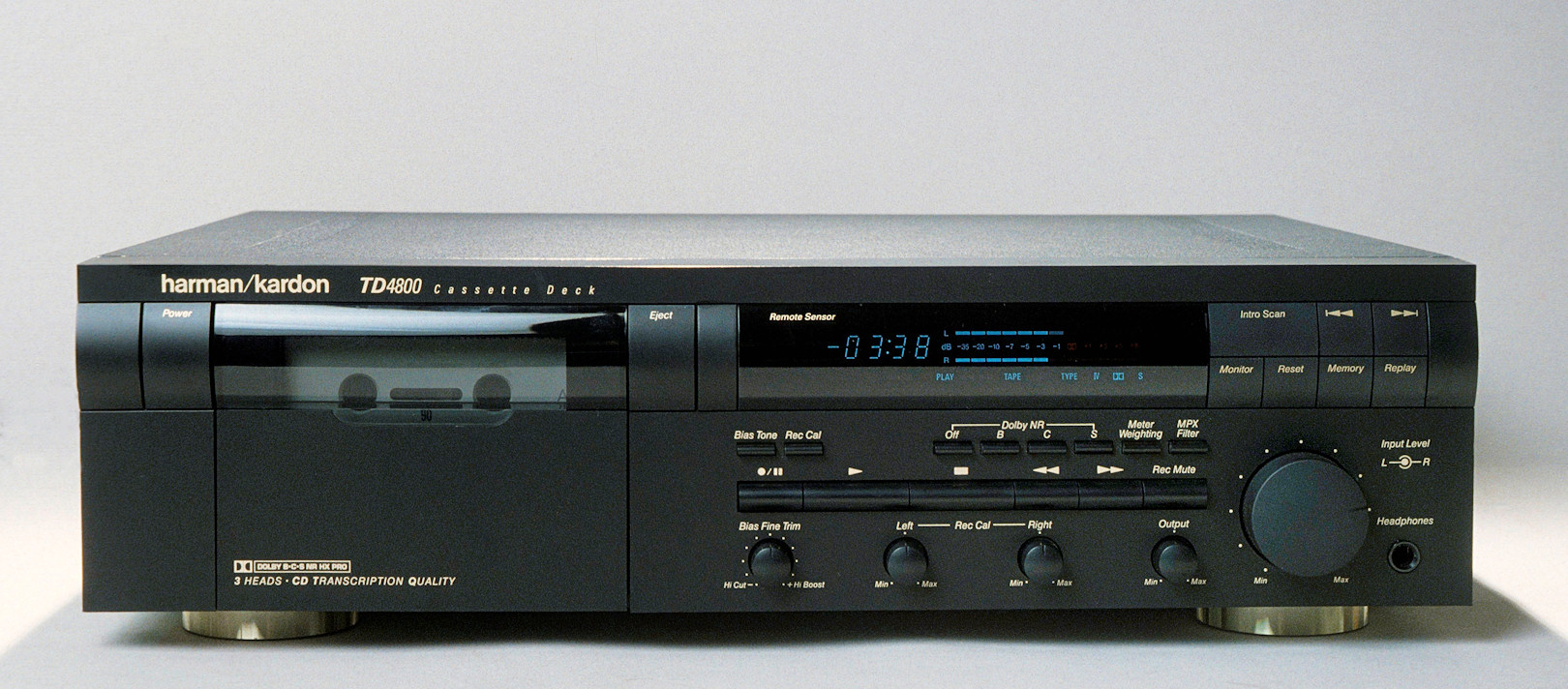
Dolby S Tapedeck since 1990

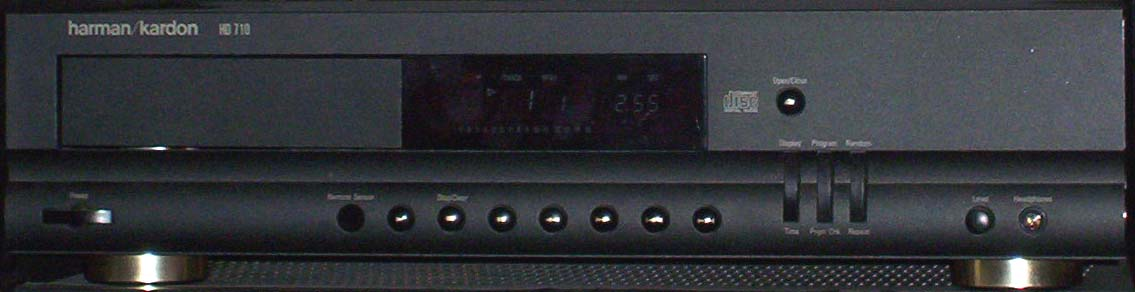
CD-Player HD 710 (1996–1998)

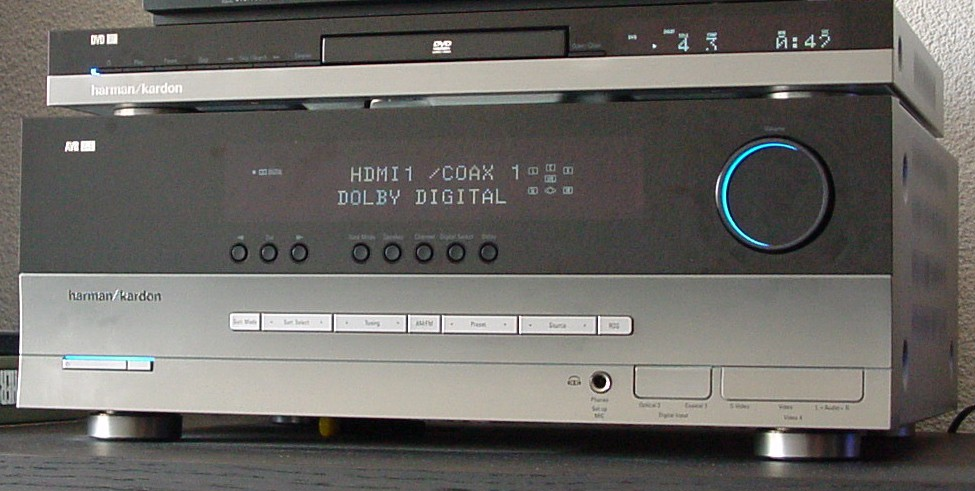
AV-equipment
(about 2005)

Harman Kardon iSub Subwoofer (top view)

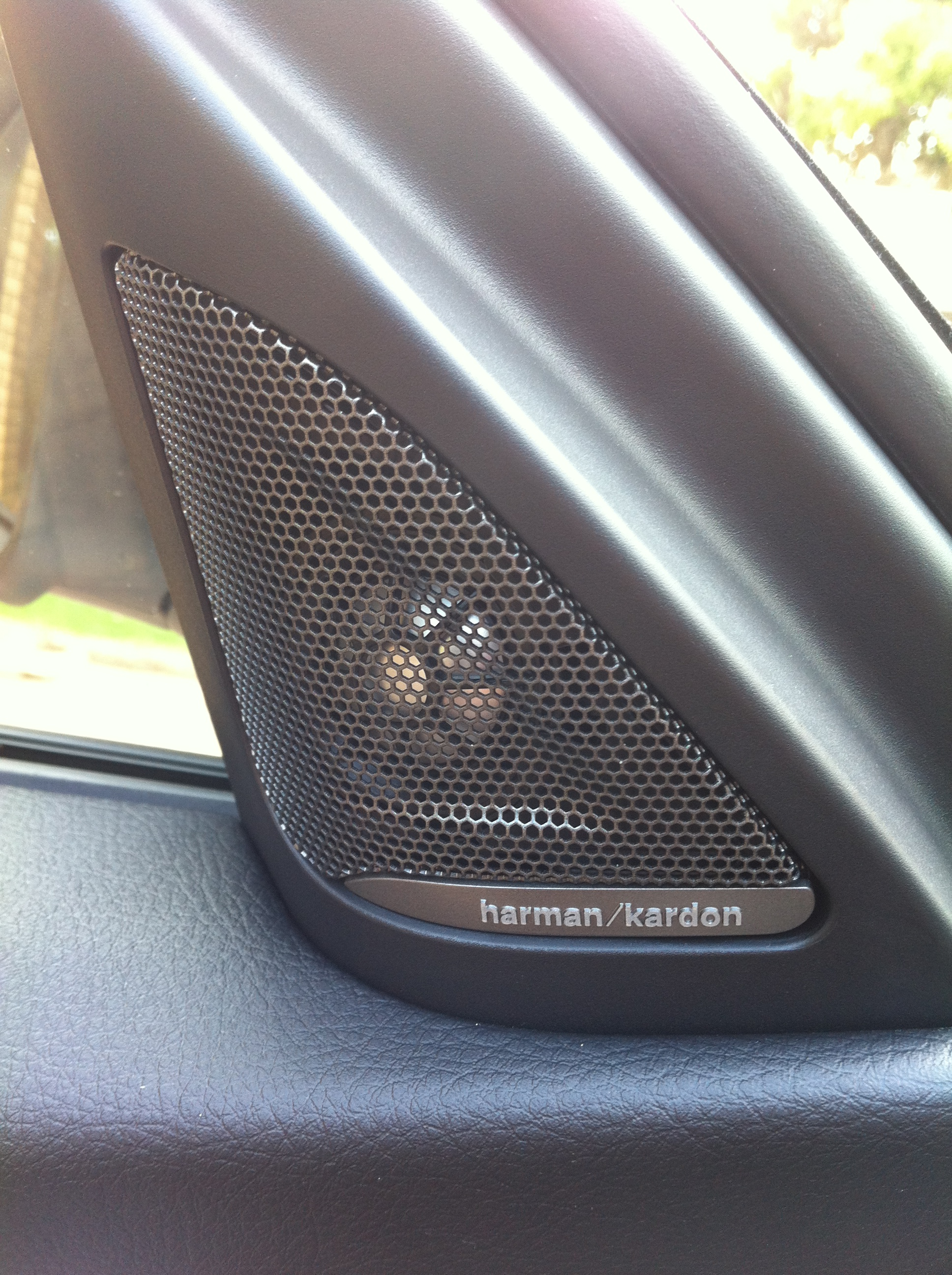
Harman Kardon Car Audio Speaker in a BMW

== See also ==
- List of phonograph manufacturers
