= Harman International =

American electronics company

Harman International Industries, Inc.
- Type: Subsidiary
- Traded as: NYSE: HAR (1986-2017) S&P 100 component (until 2017) S&P 500 component (until 2017)
- Industry: Audio electronics
- Founded: 1980; 46 years ago
- Founders: Sidney Harman; Bernard Kardon
- Headquarters: Stamford, Connecticut, U.S.
- Key people: Christian Sobottka (president & CEO)
- Products: Audio equipment
- Brands: See list
- Revenue: ▲$11 billion(2025)
- Number of employees: 39000 (2025)
- Parent: Samsung Electronics
- Website: www.harman.com

Harman International Industries, Inc., commonly known as Harman, is an American audio electronics company. Since 2017, the company has been operating as an independent subsidiary of Samsung Electronics.

Headquartered in Stamford, Connecticut, US, Harman maintains major operations in the Americas, Europe, and Asia. Harman markets its products under various brands such as Arcam, Bowers & Wilkins, Denon, Harman Kardon, JBL and Lexicon.

== Background ==
Sidney Harman and Bernard Kardon founded the predecessor to Harman International, Harman Kardon, in 1953. Both Harman and Kardon were engineers by training and had worked at the Bogen Company, which was a manufacturer of public address systems. They developed high-fidelity audio products together. Harman bought out his partner in 1956 and then expanded Harman Kardon.

== History ==
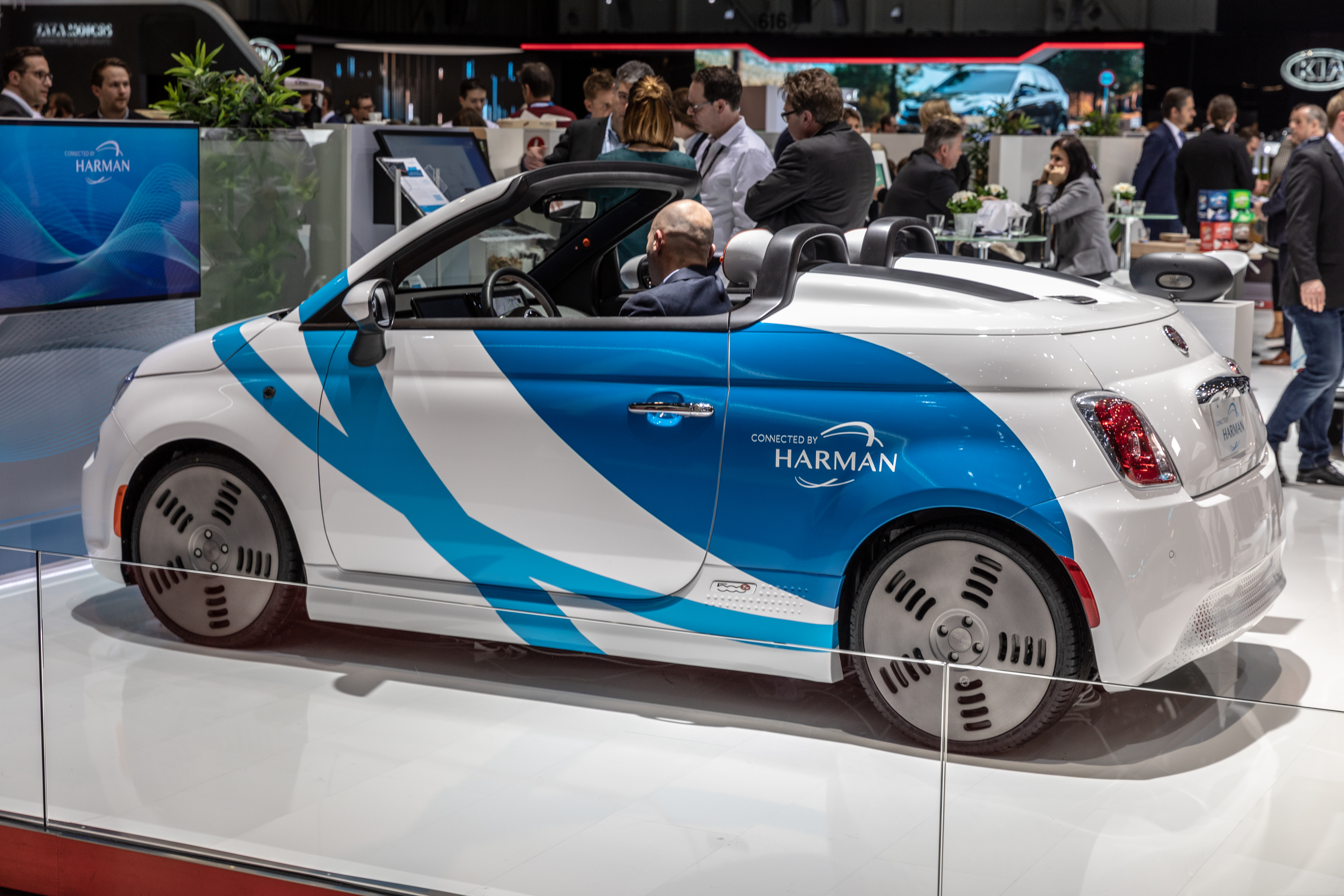
Promotional vehicle at Geneva International Motor Show 2019

In the 1960s, Harman Kardon acquired other audio companies such as JBL. In the 1970s, Harman accepted an appointment in the Carter administration as United States Deputy Secretary of Commerce and sold his company to conglomerate Beatrice Foods to avoid a conflict of interest. Beatrice sold many portions of the company, including the original Harman Kardon division.

After he left his government position in 1978, he created Harman International Industries and reacquired a number of businesses he sold to Beatrice. The company continued its growth with a string of acquisitions throughout the 1980s. Harman International went public in 1986 with a stock offering on the New York Stock Exchange. Cash from that sale was used to purchase other professional and consumer audio companies, including Soundcraft, DOD Electronics Corp, Infinity and Epicure loudspeakers, Allen & Heath, dbx, Studer, Lexicon, AKG, BSS, Orban, Quested and Turbosound.

A 2003 acquisition was Madrigal Audio Laboratories which includes Mark Levinson and Revel. In July 2011, Harman acquired MWM Acoustics. Harman expanded to include lighting in 2013 with the acquisition of Martin Professional. In June 2014, Harman completed the acquisition of AMX LLC.

In March 2015, Harman acquired the automotive division of Bang & Olufsen for €145 million (US$156 million) for the unit as well as technology license fees. The purchase did not include Bang & Olufsen's consumer-electronics business. Later that year, recognizing the increasing role of software and services in the markets it served, Harman expanded its capabilities around cloud, mobility and analytics with the acquisitions of Symphony Teleca, a software services company based in Mountain View, CA, and Redbend, an Israeli-based provider of software management technology for connected devices, and over-the-air (OTA) software and firmware upgrading services.

In March 2016, Harman acquired the automotive cyber-security firm TowerSec. This acquisition was notable for further demonstrating Harman's desire to expand beyond its traditional business areas of in-car audio and entertainment systems.

On November 14, 2016, Harman entered into an agreement to be acquired by Samsung Electronics for $8 billion in cash. In February 2017, Harman International shareholders voted in favor of the acquisition by Samsung. On March 10, 2017, the acquisition was completed, with Harman becoming the independent subsidiary of Samsung.

In 2017, Samsung acquired Harman International. Harman makes high fidelity audio products under many brand names such as AKG, AMX, Becker, Crown, Harman Kardon, Infinity, JBL, Lexicon, dbx, DigiTech, Mark Levinson, Martin, Revel, Soundcraft, Studer, Arcam, Bang & Olufsen and BSS Audio.

In May 2025, Harman agreed to the acquirement of Sound United, which includes brands Bowers & Wilkins, Marantz, Denon, Polk Audio, Definitive Technology, Classé, HEOS and Boston Acoustics, from Masimo which exits its consumer audio business.

In December 2025, it was announced that Harman had agreed to acquire the advanced driver-assistance system (ADAS) business of ZF Group for €1.5 billion. The transaction, expected to close in the second half of 2026, subject to regulatory approval, included compute platforms, smart camera and radar technologies, and the transfer of approximately 3,750 employees.

== Private equity attempt ==
Harman International Industries was to delist from NYSE in Q3/2007 due to a buy-out by KKR and Goldman Sachs Alternatives. However, as of mid-September 2007, KKR announced it would back out of the deal.

Coincident with the buy-out deal, Dinesh Paliwal was hired as company president and CEO in July 2007. On July 1, 2008, Sidney Harman was succeeded by Dinesh Paliwal as chairman of the board. In April 2020 he was succeeded by Michael Mauser.

== Brands ==
Current
- AKG – microphone/headphones
- AMX – video switching and control devices
- Arcam – high-end home audio – amplifiers and audio components
- AXYS Tunnel – Amplifier for public tunnel
- Bang & Olufsen Automotive – car audio
- Becker – car infotainment
- Boston Acoustics
- Bowers & Wilkins – headphones and loudspeakers
- BSS Audio – signal processing
- Caaresys – in-cabin safety systems
- Classé – amplifiers and surround sound processors
- Crown International – pro amplifiers
- dbx – signal processors
- Definitive Technology – home theater systems and headphones
- Denon – audio/visual receivers
- HALOsonic – Noise Management Solutions
- HardWire – guitar pedals
- Harman Kardon – home/car audio
- HEOS – wireless multi-room audio platform used in Denon and Marantz products
- HiQnet – control network for digital audio equipment, supporting communication over TCP/IP, USB and RS232
- Infinity – home/car speakers/headphones
- JBL – home/car speakers & amplifiers, professional speakers, headphones
- Lexicon – digital audio processing
- Marantz – audio/visual receivers
- Mark Levinson – home/car audio
- Martin Professional – stage and architectural lighting and effects fixtures
- Polk Audio – home/car speakers and amplifiers
- Revel – home/car speakers
- Roon – multiplatform audiophile music player and app for audio streaming, acquired in 2023
- Selenium – home, car and professional speakers, amplifiers, sound tables/mixers
- S1nn GmbH & Co.
- Soundcraft – mixing consoles

Previous

- AIR and Flash – a cross-platform runtime system for building desktop applications and mobile applications (until 2025)
- Studer – mixing consoles, sold to Evertz Microsystems 2021
