= NAD 3020 =

Integrated amplifier by NAD electronics

NAD 3020 integrated amplifier

The NAD 3020 is a stereo integrated amplifier by NAD Electronics, it is an important component in the history of high fidelity audio. Launched in 1978, this product delivered a good quality sound, while being affordable. It acquired a reputation as a well known and popular audiophile amplifier. By 1998, the NAD 3020 had become the best-selling audio amplifier in history.

== History ==
Launched in 1978 when the principal preoccupation of hi-fi manufacturers was power output, the sub-£80 (US$135) low-powered solid state amplifier, created and marketed by a then little-known manufacturer, gained a reputation for excellent sound quality and exceptional value. Stereophile magazine called the NAD 3020 "ridiculously inexpensive". It was the first integrated amplifier built with convincing ability to drive difficult loudspeaker loads, and a sound quality that far exceeded other integrated amplifiers at its price point for the time.

In an era when the NAD's rated power output of 20 watts per channel continuous into 8 ohms was considered anaemic, the manufacturer claimed it could deliver much stronger power output into lower impedances under dynamic conditions (music or peak power output). Indeed, it is capable of delivering 40 watts into 8 ohm, 58 watts into 4 ohm, and 72 watts into 2 ohm loads for a limited time if pushed. The amplifier's main appeal was its inherent musicality, its ability to drive difficult speaker loads, and to allow audiophile grade source components to excel. Launching the product in the US at the Consumer Electronics Show, the company wired up a battery of loudspeakers in a way which presented an impedance of 1.1 ohm, and the amplifier experienced no problems. Similarly, at its London launch, NAD successfully demonstrated it driving the Linn Isobarik, whose impedance characteristics are known to be very challenging for amplifiers. It was the best-known and best-selling amplifier in the annals of hi-fi. The NAD 3020 revolutionised the amplifier segment of the hi-fi industry.

=== Design principles ===
Bjørn Erik Edvardsen, NAD's director of advanced development, set out to create an "inexpensive amplifier ... easily capable of driving the very best loudspeakers". NAD eschewed the laboratory test equipment thinking, which was prevalent at the time, and instead aimed to make their amplifiers capable of properly driving "real loudspeakers" under realistic conditions. This paradigm shift gave rise to an amplifier that cost less and sounded better. NAD was able to achieve a low cost base by foreign manufacture. The company designed the product in Europe and had it produced in factories in Taiwan – it was one of the first manufacturers to de-localise production to Asia.

The design, and models following it, included "soft-clipping circuitry" that protects against over-driven signals, connections that allow splitting of the power amplifier section from the preamplifier, and "Full Disclosure" power ratings measuring output power under real-world loads.

==== Audio circuitry ====
The NAD 3020 has four inputs that can be switched via the front panel – Aux, Tuner, Phono, Tape. The manufacturer claims the phono input, which can also be used with high-output moving coil cartridges, contains a 6-transistor circuit "engineered for extremely low noise and nearly distortion-free performance". Reviewers note the pre-amplifier's "decent moving-magnet phono stage". The amplifier is bandwidth-limited, incorporating infrasonic and ultrasonic filters to supposedly reduce the effects of non-musical signals such as acoustic feedback, disc warps and electromagnetic interference on the musical signals.

The amplifier has bass and treble tone controls which, according to the manufacturer, are "tailored for musically effective response in the high and low frequencies without altering the critical mid-range tonal balance". A loudness switch – de rigueur in that era – boosts upper and lower frequencies; a "mute" switch reduces volume by 20 dB for low-level listening. There is also a headphone socket mounted onto the front panel.

According to the manufacturer, the NAD 3020 is a high voltage design that uses the same large powerful output transistors (2N3055 and MJ2955) that "other manufacturers employ in their '60-watt' amplifiers", enabling the amplifier to deliver power headroom for musical transients. The "Soft Clipping" circuitry is intended to limit the output voltage so that the transistors do not distort when driven beyond its rated power.

The innovative split of pre- and power-amplifier sections allows the use of the pre-amp stage to drive multiple power amplifiers in parallel, or use long signal cables to connect to remote power amplifiers or powered speakers. This facility became hugely popular with audiophiles, who would seek to isolate this "remarkably fine-sounding preamp section", to use with one or more external power amplifiers.

==== Power source ====
The amplifier has what the manufacturer calls a "dual-mode power supply", where the output stage is only loosely regulated, so it is free to supply the high voltages needed for musical transients and the large currents at lower voltages needed for driving low-impedance loads in the power amplifier circuitry. The design also incorporates a separate regulated power supply circuit, fed from a secondary winding on the transformer, dedicated to the pre-amplifier and tone control stages. It is thus claimed that intermodulation distortion and blurring of the stereo image due to power supply functioning cannot occur.

==== Styling ====
The styling of the NAD 3020 resembled that of other budget amplifiers of the time, and it was available in charcoal grey or a much rarer silver. Stereophile commented that it was "inexpensive and looked it".

=== Reception ===
The highly popular NAD 3020 is considered one of the most important hi-fi components in the history of home audio. Sonically, it benefited from a design error where crosstalk between left and right channels presented better detail and more ambiance; the error was corrected in a later guise. Its sound is described by reviewers as dark and warm, with a "sweet and sensual midrange"; some reviewers observed a very noticeable rolling off at frequency extremes that may detract from sonic neutrality, and that its soundstage lacked precision but it was universally praised for its value for money. The amplifier was a hot seller, and the NAD 3020 alone achieved a record 1.1 million units in its lifetime. The figure would be much higher if the sales of other amplifiers derived directly from its design are included. The quality made possible at a £79 (US$133) price tag opened up the market for budget yet quality amplifiers, and spawned similarly low-priced competitors such as ARCAM Alpha, Rotel 840, Mission Cyrus I, Pioneer A400, Denon PMA 350 and Marantz PM40 SE. In 2002 it ranked No. 19 in list of "The Hot 100 Products" by Stereophile. In 2011, The Absolute Sound placed it at No. 9 in their list of "The Ten Most Significant Amplifiers of All Time". The Absolute Sound remarked that this "iconic gem could embarrass amplifiers costing 10 times more with its big, warm and detailed sound and best of all, its affordable price made it available to a wider audience."

A retrospective review by Chris Martens said that the 3020 was not perfect, and while it may have been surpassed by other components according to other performance criteria individually, it was "better than any $200 integrated amp had any right to be". Martens complimented the quality of the electronic circuit design, noting in particular that the phono stage "sounded clearer and better balanced than many dedicated phonostages of the day".

=== Spin-offs and legacy ===
The newly launched NAD D 3020 hybrid digital amplifier in a shop in 2013

The NAD 3020 sold half a million units in the first three years of its life, and the second-generation NAD 3020A replacing it, which corrected some minor design errors, proved even more popular than its predecessor.

Variants included the NAD 3020B with high quality loudspeaker binding posts, NAD 3020E, and an "almost identical" audiophile version dubbed NAD 3120, stripped of tone controls and with higher quality loudspeaker binding posts. The NAD 3020i is an "improved" version of the NAD 3020 that retailed at £149 (US$250) when it was launched in 1991. The NAD 7020 receiver (tuner-amplifier), that included the amplification circuitry of the NAD 3020, received a mixed reception due to severe reliability issues. Following its release, and upon realisation that the product was much sought after for its pre-amplifier section, a preamp version of the NAD 3020 was released under the name NAD 1020.

The 3220PE and 3225PE (PE being 'Power Envelope') are further improved versions of the 3020E and 3020i respectively, sharing circuit boards with the 3020 models, the main change being a different "dual voltage" transformer and improved power supply design. A 7175PE receiver model was also launched.

In 2013, the 40th year of the company, NAD launched a range of digital products, including a digital amplifier bearing the name NAD D 3020.

== Specifications ==
- Power output: 20 watts per channel into 8Ω (stereo)
- Frequency response: 10 Hz to 70 kHz
- Total harmonic distortion: 0.02%
- Damping factor: 55
- Input sensitivity: 2.5mV (MM), 150mV (line)
- Signal to noise ratio: 75 dB (MM), 110 dB (line)
- Dimensions: 420 x 96 x 240mm
- Weight: 5.26 kg
