= Sidney Harman =

Canadian-American engineer and businessman

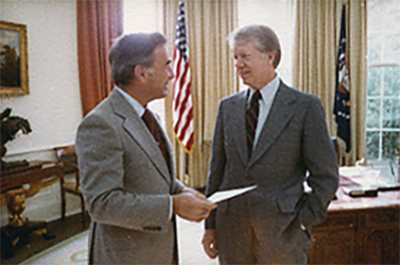
- Harman in White House Oval Office with U.S. president Jimmy Carter
- Born: Sidney Mortimer Harman; August 4, 1918; Montreal, Quebec, Canada
- Died: April 12, 2011 (aged 92); Washington, D.C., U.S.
- Education: Baruch College of the City University of New York (B.A., 1939); Union Graduate College, (Ph.D., 1973)
- Occupations: Engineer, business, entrepreneur, philanthropist, publishing
- Spouses: Sylvia Stern (m. 1945; div. 1970) Jane Harman (after 1980)

Signature
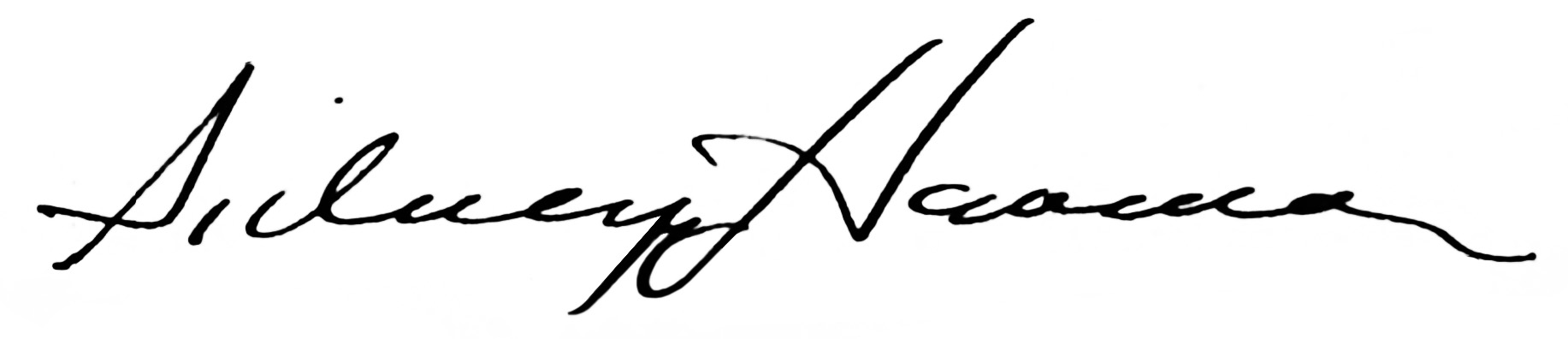

Sidney Mortimer Harman (August 5, 1918 – April 12, 2011) was a Canadian-born American engineer, businessman, manager and philanthropist active in electronics, education, government, industry, and publishing.

Harman made “high-fidelity sound [a] part of American life".

Harman's career highlights include: co-founder, CEO and Chairman Emeritus of Harman/Kardon, Inc, President of World Friends College, U.S. Under Secretary of Commerce, Fellow of American Academy of Arts and Sciences, board member of the Aspen Institute for Humanistic Studies, Isaias W. Hellman Professor of Polymathy at University of Southern California executive board chairman of Business Executives for National Security, member of the Council on Foreign Relations and CFO-owner of the Newsweek Daily Beast Co.

Harman was active in business until his death at 92 years old. He died one month after being diagnosed with acute myeloid leukemia.

== Early life and education ==
Harman was born in Montreal, Quebec, Canada, a twin and the seventh of Nathaniel and Gertrude Diana (née Silverstein) Harman's eight children. Harman immigrated with his parents and siblings to New York City in 1923 and was raised there. Harman's father managed the regional office of a hearing aid company in Montreal before moving the family for a similar job in New York.

Harman was a graduate of Baruch College of the City University of New York in 1940, earning a BA in Business Administration and later earned a Ph.D. in social psychology from the Union Graduate College in Schenectady in 1973. His doctoral thesis was titled "Business and Education - New Experiments, New Hope".

Harman was a Jewish entrepreneur and philanthropist.

== Secret US Army military service ==
Serving as a second lieutenant in the US Army Signal Corps from 1944 to 1945, Harman's abilities in engineering sound kept him from the front lines. He instead worked at a secret military base in Watertown, New York. Harman helped develop a classified “sonic deception” project meant to confuse the Nazis during the Battle of the Bulge in Belgium and in the Pacific. Recordings of various military activities were played on high-powered public address systems in the field.

In his 2003 autobiography, Harman explained “The object was to persuade sentries at enemy listening posts that a significant activity was under way, coming at them from the direction of the broadcast, while in fact the real action was from a different direction".

== Consumer electronics ==
=== Early audio career ===
After graduating from college, Harman's first job was at the David Bogen Company as an engineer where he designed public-address systems. While working at Bogen, Harman met Bernard Kardon, first Bogen's design engineer and later executive vice-president.

During his 14-year tenure at Bogen, Harman moved from engineer to sales manager. He was later named general manager of the firm.

=== Precursors of high fidelity equipment ===
In the late 1930s, Kardon had often helped recording engineers and professional musicians modify available public address amplifiers and speakers to better reproduce radio programs and recorded music.

Recognizing a nascent high-fidelity industry, Harman lobbied the Bogen company to develop improved audio systems for American consumers. Bogen wasn't interested so Harman left in 1953, taking Kardon with him.

=== Harman/Kardon Inc. ===
Naming their new company Harman/Kardon Inc., each invested $5,000 (equivalent to $60,168 in 2025) in capital. Harman handled sales, merchandising, and advertising, while Kardon was Chief Engineer, Designer and Production Manager.

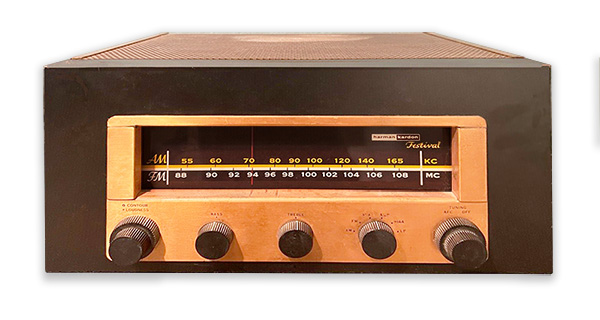
Harman Kardon Festival D-1000 receiver, c. 1954

In 1954 their first products were the 7 tube A-100 AM - FM tuner featuring automatic frequency control, priced at $70.50 (equivalent to $845 in 2025) and the Festival D-1000 receiver, the world's first integrated hi-fi receiver priced at $189.50 (equivalent to $2,272 in 2025). Advertised as having "all the critical electronic elements of a deluxe high-fidelity system on one compact, controlled chassis", the unit included a wide bandwidth FM radio tuner, a pre-amplifier and 20-watt amplifier with automatic loudness control all in a complete chassis.

The partners had created an advanced audio receiver that could be used to play radio programs and records at home with high audio fidelity by simply attaching speakers. Listeners were amazed. “We knocked the hell out of them; they were trembling with Shostakovich's Fifth” Harman said. “Nobody had heard anything like that in his living room”, Harman recalled.

By 1956 Harmon/Kardon was worth $600,000 (equivalent to $7,105,263 in 2025). Kardon retired in 1957.

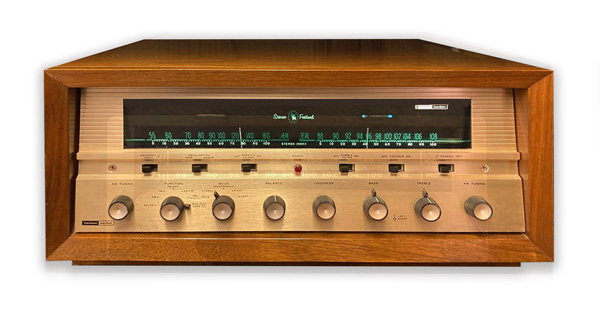
Harman Kardon Festival TA-230 receiver, c. 1958

In 1958 Harman introduced the Festival TA-230, the first high fidelity simulcast stereo receiver. Harman steadily grew his company into a consumer audio juggernaut in the home, professional, and automotive markets producing speakers, amplifiers, noise-reduction devices, video and navigation equipment, voice-activated telephones, climate controls and home theater systems.

=== Sold and repurchased Harman/Kardon ===
Avoiding conflict of interest while serving as Under Secretary of Commerce during the Carter administration, Harman sold the company to the Beatrice Company for $100 million in 1977 (equivalent to $531,301,483 in 2025). Beatrice spun the company off from its holdings and the company lost value.

Harman repurchased the company in 1980 after leaving government service, saying “There are two ways to get rich, one is to sell your company to Beatrice Foods. The other is to buy it back.”

=== HARMAN International Industries ===
Headquartering the renamed business in Stamford, Connecticut, Harman took the company public in 1986. The newly formed HARMAN International developed audio equipment aimed at the high-end consumer and professional markets. After acquiring United Technologies' wire division for $5 million, Harman built it into a $100 million division that supplied speakers to the automotive OEM market. The company earned $1.17 billion (equivalent to $2.472100895×10^{9} in 2025) in sales in 1995.

In 2002, Harman was awarded the Electronic Industries Alliance (EIA) Medal of Honor for "outstanding contributions to the advancement of the electronics industry". The EIA said Harman's "unwavering commitment to excellence, innovation, and human development, both in the electronics industry and the greater community" and his "commitment to progressive management at every level, his promotion of the arts as integral in business, and his remarkable vision in anticipating, interpreting, and giving life to the opportunities in digital technology" were the reasons for the award.

=== Retired from HARMAN International ===
In 2007, the last full year before Harman's retirement, the company he had founded and reformed had net sales of $3,551,144,000 (equivalent to $5.513933269×10^{9} in 2025) and earned a net income of $313,963,000 (equivalent to $487,496,714 in 2025). The company was then focused on three business segments - Automotive, Consumer and Professional, offering products under company-owned brand names including AKG, Becker, Crown International, dbx, DigiTech, JBL, JBL Professional, Infinity Systems, Harman/Kardon, Lexicon, Mark Levinson Audio Systems, Soundcraft and Studer.

HARMAN International corporate customers in 2007 included Apple, Inc., BMW, Land Rover, DaimlerChrysler, General Motors, Hyundai/Kia Lexus, Mercedes-Benz, Mitsubishi, Porsche, PSA Peugeot Citroën, Rolls-Royce, Saab, and Toyota.

As of June 30, 2007 the company held 1,885 trademark registrations and 294 pending trademark applications around the world. The company also held 1,695 United States and foreign patents and 2,172 pending patent applications covering various audio, infotainment and software products.

Harman retired as chairman in 2008 and was elected Chairman Emeritus. He was also one of the first inductees into the Consumer Electronics Association's Hall of Fame.

== US desegregation supporter ==
Politically liberal, Harman became active in the US civil rights movement voluntarily teaching black children after public schools in Prince Edward County, Virginia were closed in an effort to avoid court-ordered desegregation. Harman shuttled between Long Island, N.Y. and Virginia at his own cost to teach black students who were being denied public education.

== The Bolivar Project experiment in worker empowerment ==
Harman was known for improving the quality of working life through programs he initiated at the company's plants.

In 1970 a labor problems surfaced at a Harman automotive parts plant in Bolivar, Tennessee. Harman said "Our plant was aging and old-fashioned. If Charles Dickens had visited us in Bolivar, he would have felt he had never left the grimier parts of London.... I realized then that the way I ran the plant in Bolivar and at other Harman factories was in contradiction to everything I was doing at Friends World College [where Harman at the time was also serving as president]". Harman began changing the way the factory was managed.

In 1972 Harman met Irving Bluestone, vice president of the United Automobile Workers union while testifying before a United States Senate subcommittee about factory worker anger and frustration. Harman said he felt the main problem was corporate America treating employees like replaceable pieces of machinery. Bluestone asked Harman "Are you for real?" when they were introduced. Bluestone decided to work with Harman to address worker dissension at the Bolivar plant.

Supported by the Ford Foundation, the Alfred P. Sloan Foundation and the National Commission on Productivity and Work Quality, the project was initially a success. Managers had to set a quota of one group visit per week to limit distractions due to so many corporate and labor union leaders wanting to visit the plant.

The program included a company provision for child day care for employees as well as early shift ending times earned by teams meeting daily production quotas ahead of schedule. Management didn't fully support the project despite comments to the contrary. Harman later said "I didn't recognize soon enough how critical a role the managers have to play, You don't go anywhere unless you get those guys to passionately sign on." "You overlook the middle managers at your peril".

Nevertheless, the project has become a model for American industry and is a principal case study at United States business schools and abroad.

== US government service ==
In 1977 Harman accepted an appointment in the Carter administration as Under Secretary of the United States Department of Commerce. Then US law required appointees to have no direct business interests in day-to-day activities. When Harman took office in 1976, he sold his company to conglomerate Beatrice Foods to avoid a conflict of interest. Beatrice promptly sold many portions of the company, including the original Harman Kardon division, and by 1980 only 60% of the original company remained.

After he left government in 1978, he reacquired a number of businesses of Harman International he had sold to Beatrice. The company continued its growth plan with a string of acquisitions throughout the 1980s that pushed Harman International's sales from about $80 million in 1981 to more than $200 million by 1986, and then to more than $500 million by 1989.

== Supporter of education ==
Harman was a lifelong and ardent supporter of education across America.

Harman served for three years as president of Friends World College, a worldwide, experimental Quaker College.

=== Harman Professorship in International Science, Public Policy, and Human Development ===
In March 1991 Harman founded and served as an active member of the Harman Professorship in International Science, Public Policy, and Human Development at the John F. Kennedy School of Government at Harvard University.

Harman was chairman of the Program Committee of the Board of the Aspen Institute for Humanistic Studies and a member of the Board of the Carter Center of Emory University.

He was a philanthropist and a member of Washington, D.C.’s Shakespeare Theatre Company Board of Trustees. The Company's new Harman Center for the Arts is named for his family with a performance space, Sidney Harman Hall, named for him.

=== Baruch College Harman Writer-In-Residence program ===
In 1998 Harman endowed the Sidney Harman Writer-in-Residence program at Baruch College. At the 10th anniversary of the program Harman said of the program "I regard it (the program) as the single most creative impulse in my life and I do so because the arts should not be treated as decoration, as some extra-curricular activity. They should be intrinsic and organic in the developing life of a creative business person. That is what our Writer-in-Residence program encourages".

Each semester distinguished poets, playwrights, novelists, journalists and essayists are invited to participate in the program's workshops, classes and conferences. The Harman hosts guest readings and offers participants a weeklong residency. The program also sponsors creative writing competitions and literary internships for Baruch College students.

=== Academy for Polymathic Study ===
Harman was recognized as a polymath. He was founder and first chairman of the Academy for Polymathic Study at USC. He also served as the inaugural Isaias W. Hellman Professor of Polymathy in the academy. The academy encourages critical and integrative thinking, the study of history's great polymaths, and intellectual investigation across the boundaries of traditional academic specialties. In 2012 the Harman Family Foundation's gave $10 million to endow the center now named the Sidney Harman Academy for Polymathic Study.

== Publisher ==
=== Newsweek ===
Less than a year before his death, in August 2010, Harman bought Newsweek magazine from The Washington Post Company, paying $1 and accepting the assumption of $47 million in liabilities. Harman merged the news magazine with the website The Daily Beast, saying he hoped the merged media outlet would result in the “renewal and reinvention of media... it may well lead the revolution".

On July 24, 2012, the Harman family only held a minority stake in Newsweek.

== Philanthropy ==
Harman's philanthropic activities were many and varied, including serving as a trustee of the Martin Luther King Center for Social Change, the Los Angeles Philharmonic Association and the National Symphony Orchestra. He was chairman of the executive committee of the Board of the Public Agenda Foundation; chairman of the executive committee of the Board of Business Executives for National Security; a member of the Council on Foreign Relations and the U.S. Council on Competitiveness; and a member of the Board of the Leadership Institute of the University of Southern California. Harman's family has served as a major contributor to Israeli and Zionist causes during much of Harman's lifetime.

=== Harman Center for the Arts ===
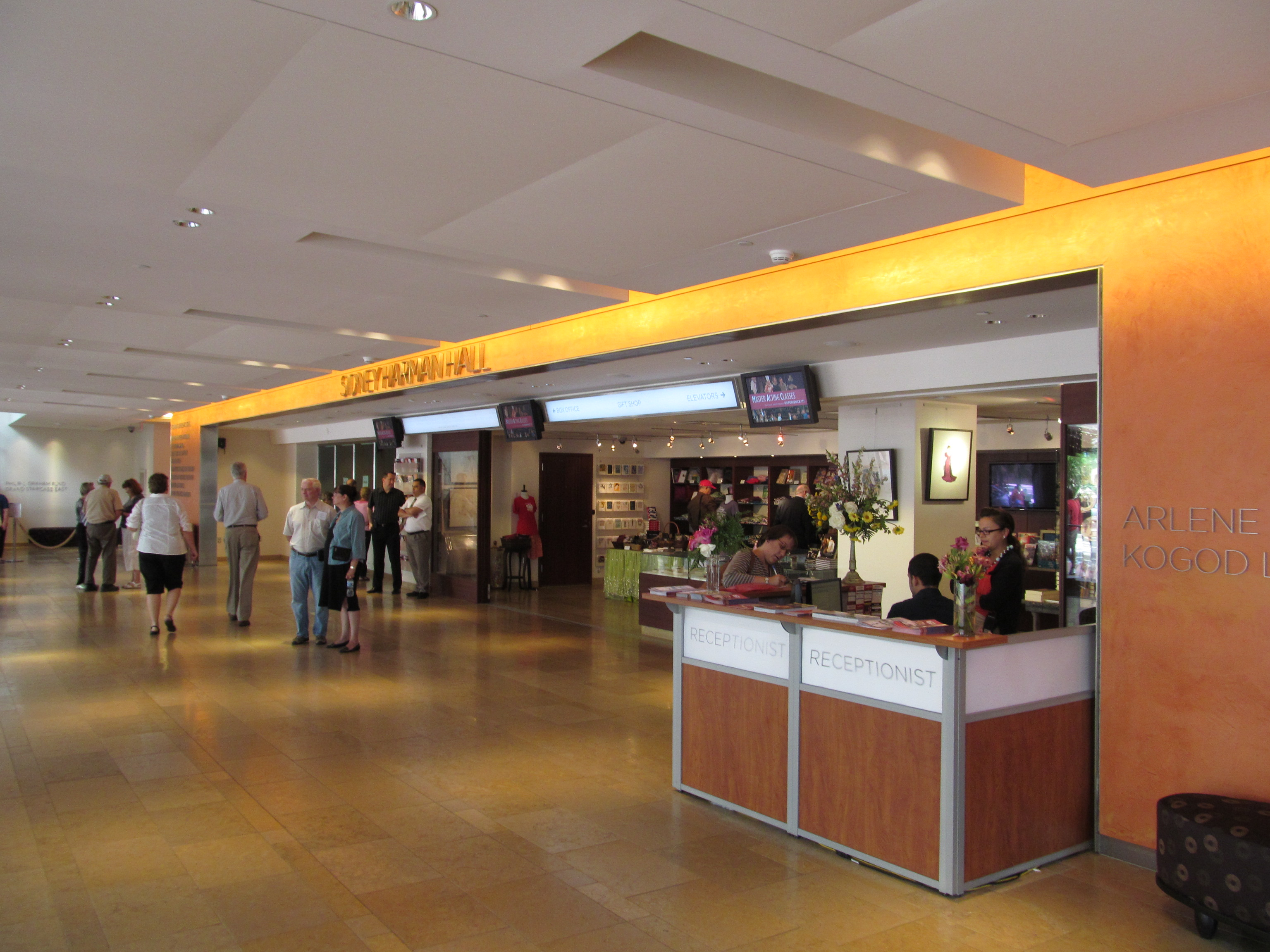
Sidney Harman Hall, Washington, D.C.

In 2004 Harman supported Washington, D.C.’s Shakespeare Theatre Company, donating $ 19.5 million dollars (including $ 5 million dollars required to be matched) of the total $ 89 million dollar project to design and build the Sidney Harman Hall and the Lansburgh Theatre which comprise the Harman Center for the Arts.

== Personal life ==
Harman was married to the former Sylvia Stern for 25 years and had four children with her. They continued an amicable relationship until her death. In 1980 Harman married his second wife Jane Harman (née Lakes), a Carter administration staffer Harman met while serving as Carter's U.S. Under Secretary of Commerce.

== Later years ==
Harman displayed a remarkable amount of energy into his 80s, staying active by playing golf and engaging in various other hobbies. He remained involved in the day-to-day management of Harman Kardon until formally retiring on his 88th birthday in August 2006. After turning 90 in 2008, he remarked "I don't feel much different than I did at 70. Maybe a little bit, but nothing has significantly diminished."

== Death and memorial celebration ==
Harman died on April 12, 2011, in Washington, D.C., at the age of 92 one month after a diagnosis of acute myeloid leukemia.

A memorial celebration for Harman was held on May 25, 2011, at Sidney Harman Hall in Washington, D.C. President Bill Clinton, US Supreme Court Justice Stephen Breyer, journalist Andrea Mitchell and Yo-Yo Ma were among the attending dignitaries who shared anecdotes of Harman's life.

Clinton recalled visiting a Harman factory in California, and how Harman gave recently laid-off workers the opportunity to use space inside the factory to make items and sell them, keeping the profits. Clinton said "That tells you something about his values and his creativity... he was a young man at 92 because he never forgot what mattered".

Breyer spoke of Harman's love of Shakespeare and his ability to recite large portions of plays from memory. Breyer said Harman felt those "literary gems shed light on contemporary problems... but he did not live in the past" but used "the past to inform the future".

Andrea Mitchell said of Harman "There was no one better at making a toast and he never needed a note—or a teleprompter. He was always smarter, funnier, and better company than anyone else in the room".

== Bibliography ==
- Starting with the People (with Daniel Yankovich) (1988)
- Mind Your Own Business: A Maverick's Guide to Business, Leadership and Life (2003)

== Awards ==
• 2000 - Consumer Electronics Association Hall of Fame - Inaugural inductee

• 2002 - Electronic Industries Alliance Medal of Honor recipient

• 2003 - Aspen Institute Award for Corporate Leadership

• 2007 - Entrepreneur of the Year - USC Marshall's Lloyd Greif Center for Entrepreneurial Studies

• 2007 - Washingtonian of the Year

• 2008 - First Judge Widney Professor of Business at University of Southern California.
