= IOnRoad =

Driving safety app

iOnRoad
- Release: May, 2011 (Private Beta); October, 2011 (Open Beta); November, 2011 (Public Release)
- Stable release: 1.3 / Oct 14, 2012
- Operating system: Android (operating system) Version 2.2
- Available in: English
- Type: Transportation
- License: Proprietary
- Website: www.ionroad.com

iOnRoad is a free augmented reality driving safety app owned by Harman. It received the International CES 2012 innovation award. The program uses the GPS feature, gyroscope and video camera stream of the native mobile device to monitor a vehicle’s position on the road, alerting drivers of lane departures and potential collisions with audio and visual cues. iOnRoad has been downloaded by over 500,000 people.

In 2012, iOnRoad won the most innovative product award in the transportation category at the International CTIA conference. The app was also awarded the Best Product Demo at the 2012 Microsoft ThinkNext. The mobile application is incorporated with Qualcomms FastCV SDK which offers support for ARM based devices. At its launch, iOnRoad was released for Android mobile devices. In 2012, the company announced that it had plans to release the application on the Apple iOS platform in the near future.

== History ==
iOnRoad was developed by an Israeli digital company. In May 2011, the app was released to closed private beta testing. In October 2011, the app demoed at the International CES trade show where it was selected for the CES innovation, design and engineering award. In 2011, developers announced the launch of iOnRoad for Android-based devices at the Israel Mobile Summit. Within the first two months of its release, iOnRoad was downloaded over 200,000 times. In October 14, 2012, the company released version 1.3 of the program.

In April 2013, iOnRoad was acquired by Harman. Following the acquisition it is planned that iOnRoad's app will be embedded with Harman's media and navigation systems.

== Features ==
The program’s primary purpose is to protect cars from being involved in an accident. The application measures the vehicle’s headway distance, alerting the driver to his speed, and proximity to the traffic ahead. While iOnRoad is in use, the phone is connected to the dashboard. Drivers are provided with a personal web dashboard that they can use in making phone calls, playing music or checking a map. The app also assigns points for safe driving tactics, allowing other iOnRoad drives to compete for the title of safest driver.

== Awards and recognition ==
- CES 2012 Design and Engineering Showcase Award
- Winner of the 2012 CTIA Emerging technology awards
- Gartner Cool Automotive vendor for 2012
- Awarded Best Product Demo at the 2012 Microsoft ThinkNext
