= A&R (disambiguation) =

A&R is a common abbreviation for artists and repertoire and also for amplification and recording.

A&R may also refer to:

- A & R, Cambridge Ltd, a British hi-fi equipment manufacturer
- A & R Recording, a New York recording studio
- Angus & Robertson, an Australian bookseller
