= Classe =

Classe may refer to:

- Classe, ancient port of Ravenna, Italy
  - Basilica of Sant'Apollinare in Classe, a 6th-century church in Ravenna
- Classé, a Canadian manufacturer of audio equipment
- Coalition large de l'association pour une solidarité syndicale étudiante (CLASSE), Canadian student union
- Cornell Laboratory for Accelerator-based ScienceS and Education (CLASSE), a particle accelerator facility
