= Madrigal Audio Laboratories =

Madrigal Audio Laboratories was founded in 1984 by Sanford Berlin (1927 – March 11, 2008), when he took over the Highend audio-company Mark Levinson. Further brands of Madrigal were Audioaccess, Proceed, Madrigal, and Imaging. 1997 the subsidiary Revel Audio for high quality loudspeakers was founded.

In 1986 Madrigal went to court with Mark Levinson. One result was, that Levinson was not allowed to use his name as a trade anymore.

In 1990 Madrigal offered a high value CD Player branded as Proceed. Further models, for example the PCD3 1992, followed. The PCx-models had a weight of 12.25 kg (27 lbs), even the slim CDD (in 1997) had a weight of 11.4 kg. In 1996 multichannel amplifiers were branded also as Proceed.

A further product were state of the art video-projectors.

The company closed in 2002 and became part of the Harman International Industries group.
