= Caaresys =

Israeli in-cabin safety company

- Type: Private
- Industry: Automotive safety
- Founded: 2017
- Headquarters: Netanya, Israel
- Key people: Ilya Sloushch, CEO; Arshavski Alexander, VP R&D; Vadim Kotlar, CTO; Konstantin Berezin, COO; Josh Rowe, Lead System Engineer; Reut Lanyado, Senior Algorithm Engineer
- Services: in-cabin radar sensors
- Website: web.archive.org/web/20211127112841/https://caaresys.com/

Caaresys is an Israeli in-cabin safety company that develops radio frequency radar sensors for vital signs monitoring. The company is based in Netanya, Israel.

== Overview ==
Caaresys was founded in 2017 by Ilya Sloushch, Vadim Kotlar, Konstantin Berezin and Alex Arshavski.

Its passenger monitoring system based on micro radar utilizes biometrics to detect the location and state of each person in the car. The system monitors several biometric signals of passengers, including respiration rate, heart rate, and heart rate variability. Sensor system can be placed anywhere in the car.

Caaresys' product portfolio includes three products: VitalCaare (monitors car occupants' condition), BabyCaare (child presence detection) and CabinCaare (monitors car occupancy).

Caaresys has partnered with a number of manufacturers, including SMK Electronics and Infineon Technologies, delivering passenger sensing systems.

In September 2022 the company was acquired by Harman International, joining its automotive unit. It is planned that Caaresys' technologies will augment Harman's in-cabin monitoring systems.

== Recognition ==
Caaresys was listed among Top picks of TechCrunch Disrupt San Francisco 2018 in Mobility & Transportation category.
