= Loudness compensation =

Equalization for low-loudness listening

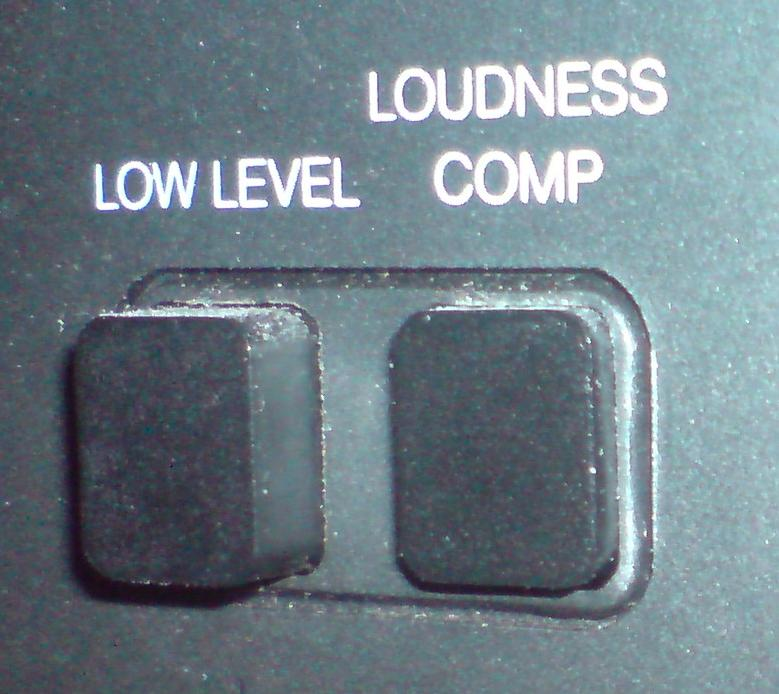
Loudness compensation activated on an NAD amplifier.

Loudness compensation, or simply loudness, is a setting found on some hi-fi equipment that increases the level of the high and low frequencies. This is intended to be used while listening at low volume levels, to compensate for the fact that as the loudness of audio decreases, the ear's lower sensitivity to extreme high and low frequencies may cause these signals to fall below the threshold of hearing. As a result, audio material may become thin sounding at low volumes, losing bass and treble. The loudness compensation feature applies equalization and is intended to rectify this situation.

Boosting these frequencies produces a flatter equal-loudness contour that appears to be louder even at low volume, preventing the perceived sound from being dominated by the mid-frequencies where the ear is most sensitive. The loudness feature has largely been discontinued.

== Calibration ==
Correct loudness compensation requires a calibrated system with known listening level. Audio level at a listener's ears depends on the listening environment, listener position, speaker sensitivity, as well as amplifier gain. For loudness compensation to work correctly, the playback system must also accurately assume what volume level was used in mastering. For movie soundtracks, this reference volume level is an industry standard and can be used by manufacturers to provide a loudness feature that works with a reasonable degree of accuracy. A home theater product that provides a reference level indication on the volume control can be expected to work well with movie soundtracks.

== See also ==
- Equal-loudness contour
