= Martin Professional =

Manufacturer of stage and architectural lighting and effects

- Industry: Stage and architectural lighting and effects
- Founded: Aarhus, Denmark (1987)
- Founder: Peter Johansen
- Headquarters: Aarhus, Denmark
- Products: Intelligent lights, Fog machines, LED fixtures
- Revenue: ▲$38 million (Q3 FY12)
- Owner: Samsung Electronics
- Number of employees: 800
- Parent: Harman International Industries
- Website: http://www.martin.com

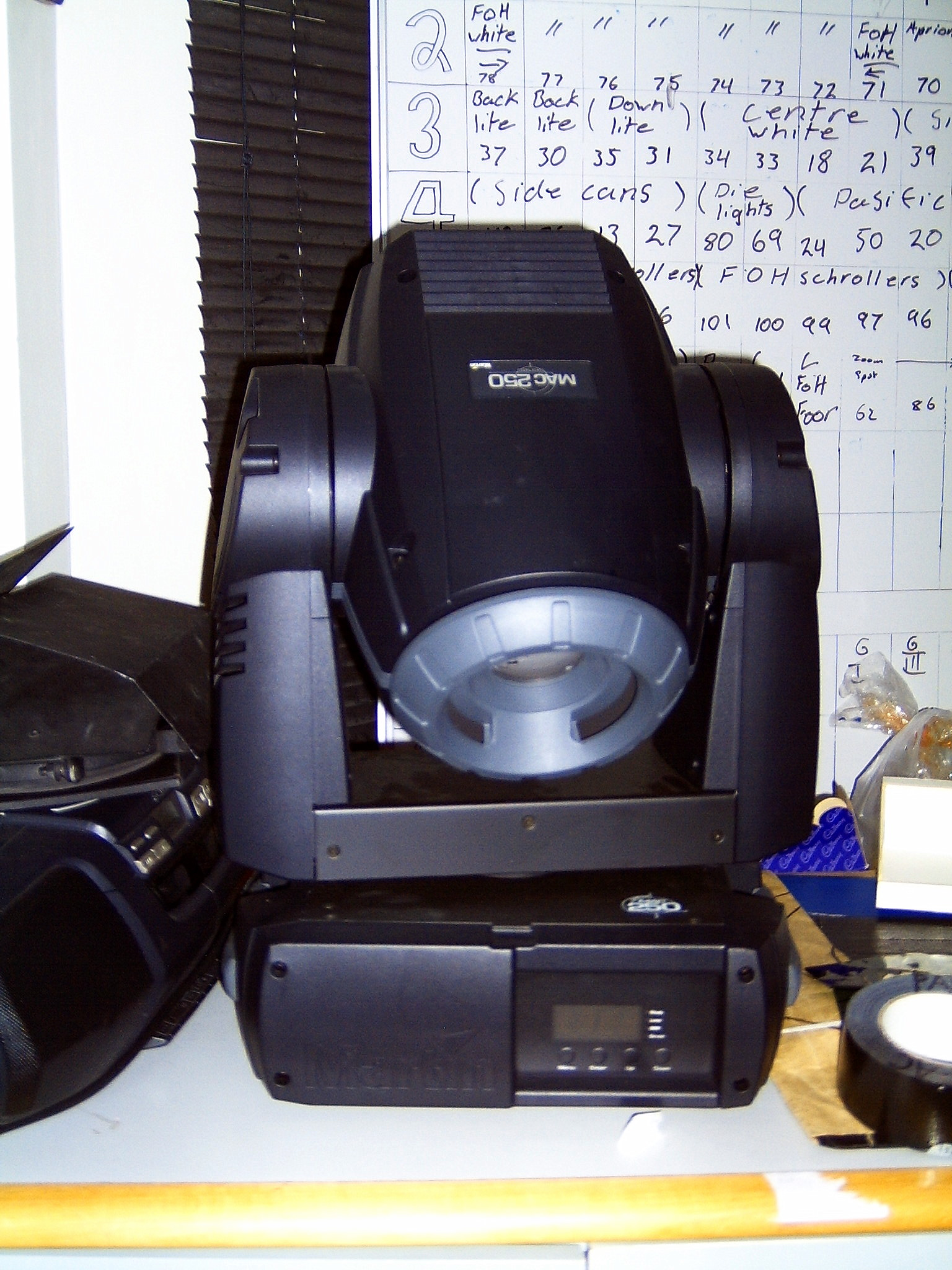
A Martin Mac 250 light, used mainly in smaller theatres.

Martin Professional (Harman Professional Denmark ApS) is a Danish manufacturer and distributor of stage and architectural lighting and effects fixtures. It is owned by Harman International Industries, a subsidiary of Samsung Electronics. The company is based in Aarhus, Denmark.

== History ==
The history of Martin began in 1978 when founder Peter Johansen realized how to make a smoke generator from a coffee maker. The company was founded in Aarhus in 1986 and began producing primarily fog machines and a small selection of disco lights in 1987. Its name was acquired through cooperation with a French smoke machine company.

In 1993 Martin established Mach, an audio unit.

In 1994 the revenue exceeded 100 million Danish kroner and in 1995 the company was listed on the Copenhagen Stock Exchange, raising a net value of 85.5 million Danish kroner. In 1999, Danish industrial firm Schouw & Co. purchased a 60 percent stake in the company. By 2001, Schouw had fully acquired Martin and delisted it from the stock exchange. Martin expanded production in 2002 through a new 11,500-square-meter (124,000 sq ft) factory in Frederikshavn, and a year later the company began outsourcing production to China at a factory in Zhuhai.

In 2006 Mach Audio was phased out.

Martin enjoyed continued growth until the 2008 financial crisis; it reported a loss of more than 200 million Danish kroner in 2009 and had layoffs of 130 employees at their production sites in Frederikshavn.

Continued innovation especially within LED technology has helped the company through the crisis and resulted in several product awards. In 2010 the Confederation of Danish Industries presented Martin with its annual product award for the MAC 350 Entour LED based automated lighting fixture. The LED technology used in the product was a result of a three-year collaboration with Aalborg University. Furthermore, the MAC Aura luminaire and MAC Viper Profile won the PLASA award for innovation in 2011 and 2012 respectively. Martin started moving its production back to Denmark in the first half of 2012 their factory in Frederikshavn with 26 new employees. The move was made possible by a reduced labor demand in Martins new production lines.

=== Under Harman ===
In 2013 Harman International Industries completed the acquisition of Martin from Schouw. The acquisition did not include the two factories in Frederikshavn, but included an agreement to rent the buildings from Schouw. The acquisition led to the release of the Mach brand which was sold to a cooperation of Canadian and Hong Kong investors. They relaunched the brand under its own company.

In August 2015 Harman announced the intention to close the factory in Frederikshavn. The closure was completed on 31 March 2016.

In March 2018 the M-Series range of lighting controllers and software were acquired by Elation Professial. Harman sees lighting as the core product. Since then Martin belongs to Harman Professional Solutions.

== Today ==
Martin lighting fixtures have been used for a number of major international events, such as the 2001 Eurovision song contest in Copenhagen, the 2004 Summer Olympics in Athens and at the Beijing 2008 summer olympics where Martin was the main provider of automated lighting with over 1100 luminaries at the opening ceremony. Furthermore, Martin is one of the chief technology companies in the Aarhus area, and has a strategic partnership with Aarhus University School of Engineering.

== Products ==
Early on, Martin specialized in fog effect machines; They produced few lighting fixtures. In 1993, the company started producing the Mach series of live sound products, which were quickly discontinued. By 1997, the company realized its full potential as a leading manufacturer in the emerging market of DMX intelligent stage lighting products with the launch of the MAC 500 and 600.

Martin's most prominent product to date is the MAC 2000 moving head fixture. It is used primarily by large theaters, concert producers and major television networks and production companies.

In addition to moving heads, Martin also manufactures flat mirror and rotating drum-style scanners, strobes, color changers, semi-intelligent effects, LED fixtures, controllers for Intelligent lighting, media servers and a line of smoke machines.

Martin's current product line includes the Martin MAC Viper, the LED MAC Quantum series and MAC Aura and the RUSH DJ range, a successor to the Martin Mania range.

Another of Martin's current product line is the Era series featuring the era 400 performance, the era 500 hybrid up, the era 600 performance, the era 300 profile and the era 800 performance.

In October 2018 the LED moving head MAC Allure Profile was launched.
