= Revel Audio =

Loudspeaker company owned by Harman International

Revel
- Industry: High-end home and in-vehicle audio
- Founded: Northridge, California, United States (1997)
- Founder: Sanford Berlin
- Headquarters: Stamford, Connecticut, United States
- Key people: Dinesh Paliwal
- Products: Floorstanding Speakers, Bookshelf Speakers, Center Channel, Surround Speakers, Subwoofers, On-Wall Speakers, In-Wall Speakers, In-Ceiling Speakers, Extreme Climate, Vehicle Audio
- Parent: Harman International Industries
- Divisions: Home, Automotive
- Website: http://www.revelspeakers.com/

Revel is an American manufacturer and distributor of high-end luxury audio loudspeakers. Since 2002 it has been owned by Harman International Industries, a subsidiary of Samsung Electronics since 2017. The company is based in Stamford, Connecticut, United States.

== History ==
Founded in 1997 by Sanford Berlin, who was owner of the Madrigal Audio Laboratories.

== Partnership with Lincoln ==
In 2015, it was announced at the North American International Auto Show that Revel would partner with the Lincoln Motor Company
