= Union Graduate College =

Schenectady, USA university (1905–2016)

Coordinates: 42°48′50″N 73°56′3″W

- Active: 1903–2016
- Location: Schenectady, New York, United States

Union Graduate College (UGC) was an American college in Schenectady, New York from 1905 until it merged into Clarkson University in 2016. It was a part of Union College from 1905 to 2003, and was independent from 2003 to 2016.

== Organization ==
The constituent schools of Union Graduate College included the School of Management, the School of Education, the School of Engineering, the Institute for a Sustainable Environment and the Bioethics Program.

== History ==
=== As part of Union College ===
The history of Union Graduate College began in the early 1900s during which time advanced degree study was being conducted at Union College in several disciplines.

The master's degree in electrical engineering was available as early as 1905 and was the first graduate degree awarded by Union to a woman, when Florence Buckland received her master's degree in electrical engineering in 1925.

The Union Graduate College School of Management began in the economics department of Union College. In May 1961, the Union Board of Trustees approved a master's program in industrial administration. The first three degrees in industrial administration were awarded in 1964.

A team of academic and administrative faculty was formed in 1986 to investigate the possibility of creating a teacher education program. It developed Union Graduate College's Master of Arts in Teaching (MAT) program in discipline areas that dove-tailed with many of the College's academic strengths: biology, chemistry, earth science (geology), French, German, Greek, Latin, mathematics, physics, social studies, and Spanish. The first class of 15 MAT students graduated in 1990.

Union College continued to expand its graduate degree study offerings with new master's programs in management, healthcare management, engineering, education and bioethics, developing innovative programs through strategic relationships with other upstate New York education institutions such as Albany Law School, Albany College of Pharmacy and Albany Medical College. Union College established what was then known as the “Center for Graduate from Education and Special Programs” to administer these advanced degree programs.

=== Independent institution ===
By 2000, bolstered by expanding enrollments in all graduate programs and the growing regional demand for full-time and part-time graduate study, Union recognized the need to create a new, independent, professional graduate college. The Graduate College of Union University was formed and chartered by the State Board of Regents as an independent college in July 2003. The school's name was changed to Union Graduate College in May 2006, a name that better reflected its Union College heritage.

In 2015, the New York State Education Department Board of Regents and the Middle States Commission on Higher Education, approved the acquisition of Union Graduate College by Clarkson University. The merger became official on February 1, 2016, with Union Graduate College becoming the Clarkson University Capital Region Campus in Schenectady, N.Y. The merger was relatively unique in higher education, as both schools were in a sound fiscal position, both meeting and exceeding current enrollment targets, and both in good standing with their accrediting agencies.

=== Clarkson University Capital Region Campus ===
As the Clarkson University Capital Region Campus, it serves as a recruiting hub for graduate and professional degree program admissions at all the institution's operations in New York State and online. This includes Clarkson's Beacon Institute for Rivers & Estuaries in Beacon, N.Y., and a partnership with the Trudeau Institute in Saranac Lake, N.Y.

In November 2023, Clarkson considered ending the programs in teacher education at the Clarkson University Capital Region Campus. Instead, in March 2024, Clarkson sold the programs to Siena University.

== See also ==
- List of defunct colleges and universities in New York
