= AMX LLC =

American video equipment and control manufacturer

AMX Corp.
- Type: Subsidiary
- Industry: Automation and control
- Founded: Richardson, Texas, United States (1982)
- Founder: Scott Miller
- Headquarters: Richardson, Texas
- Key people: Rashid Skaf, CEO (09/2005)
- Products: See listing.
- Revenue: ▲ (est) US$295.5 million (2013)
- Number of employees: 600+ (2006)
- Parent: Harman International Industries
- Website: www.amx.com

AMX (formerly AMX, LLC) is an American manufacturer of video switching and control devices. It is currently owned by Harman International Industries, a part of the Harman Professional Division.

== Overview ==
Scott D. Miller founded AMX in 1982. AMX began with MX Series remote control for projector slide. Miller was Chief Executive Officer and President of AMX, LLC (alternative name AMX Corporation). AMX designs and manufactures hardware and software for the distribution of video within meeting spaces, as well as across buildings or the globe using IP. They also create products that allow remote control of a wide variety of equipment including HVAC.

AMX invented the world's first touch panel dedicated to room automation in 1988. AMX home automation controls are now also available through separate applications ("apps") for smartphones and tablet PCs through its authorised product partners such as Touch Panel Control. The application is available for iOS, Android, and Windows 8 platforms.

== Company growth ==
Prior to 1999, AMX traded as AMX Corp. It then changed its name to Panja Inc. In 2001, it changed its name to AMX Inc.

In February, 2005, Duchossois Industries, Inc. acquired previously publicly traded AMX for US$315 million.

On November 1, 2006, AMX announced it had acquired Endeleo, a UK-based manufacturer of analog audio visual distribution technologies. Just over a month later on December 4, 2006, AMX announced the acquisition of another signal switching and routing company, Washington-based AutoPatch. Less than two weeks later, Matrix Audio Designs, a Canadian company based in Barrie, Ontario, was acquired by AMX that specializes in high-quality, multi-room distributed audio systems.

On June 18, 2007, AMX announced it had acquired another UK-based company, Inspiration Matters, a manufacturer of digital signage technologies, known for their Inspired Signage brand name.

On October 2, 2007, AMX again announced the acquisition of another UK-based company, ProCon Technology, a company that specializes in configurable control keypad systems, switchers and distribution amplifiers. In less than a year, AMX had acquired five companies, bringing its combined employee head count to over six hundred.

On July 15, 2008, AMX acquired Atrium Group, an IPTV software company that eventually became AMX’s Vision2 IPTV solution.

On March 21, 2014, Harman International Industries, Incorporated announced it had signed an agreement with The Duchossois Group, Inc. and its affiliates to acquire AMX LLC for US$365 million.

== System layout ==
A typical AMX system consists of the following elements:

- User Interface - The User Interface receives input from a user wanting to control the system. UI devices include touch panels, keypads, remotes, and mobile apps.
- Master - The "NetLinx Master" is a combination of the CPU, a Linux-based embedded operating system, and RAM and ROM memory. When an event is received via an interface device (such as a button press on a touch panel), the master executes NetLinx code written by a programmer. The Master then sends a message to the Controller, which responds appropriately.
- Controller - Commands are relayed to it via the master, and the Controller executes the commands to the required devices. Controller can be built into the same device as the master (such as an Enova DVX Series Presentation Video Switcher or a NetLinx NX Series Controller) or separate from it (such as on an ICSLan Control Box or a DXLink transmitter or receiver). Most current master also have control ports on it, but some (most notably the Enova DGX Series Digital Video Switchers) do not.
- Video Switcher - The video matrix switcher sends video from a selected source the appropriate display. AMX uses a variety of proprietary technologies (such as SmartScale for image resolution scaling and InstaGate Pro for HDCP key handing) to ensure fast, reliable switching of video while maintaining source video quality.

=== Axcent ===
AMX used to manufacture the Axcent range of controllers, computing devices designed to be used to control other devices, typically in an Audio-Visual control system. They have now been superseded by the NetLinx controller range.

An example was the "Axcent3 Integrated Axcess Controller" which had 6 RS-232/RS-485 serial ports, 8 Relays, 6 Infrared/Serial ports and 6 Input/Outputs. Serial ports can send and receive serial strings, typically ASCII instructions and replies. Relays permit switching of modest currents. IR ports can send Infrared signals which emulate typical remote control devices that control (for instance) Televisions and VCRs. Input/output ports detect contact closures.

AMX supplies an IDE known as NetLinx Studio which allows a proprietary language to be edited, compiled and sent to the Axcent controller. The name of this language is AXCESS.

== See also ==
- Home automation
- Lighting control system
- Touch panel
- HVAC control system
