= Bernard Kardon =

American engineer and inventor

- Born: Bernard Kardon; January 8, 1914; New York City, U.S.
- Died: April 14, 1993 (aged 79); New Rochelle, New York, U.S.
- Education: Cooper Union, City College of New York (B.A., 1973), Fairleigh Dickinson University (M.S., 1976)
- Occupations: Engineer, business, entrepreneur
- Spouse: Anna Jaffee (m. 1933)

Bernard Peterson Kardon (January 8, 1914 – April 14, 1993) was an American audio pioneer who founded the Harman/Kardon audio equipment company with partner Sidney Harman in 1953.

== Early life and education ==
Kardon was born in New York City the third of Peter and Sarah (née Friedland) Kardon's five children.

As a child Kardon showed an interest in science at an early age. By the age of nine in 1922, both he and his brother Nathan would travel to their father's radio factory and assemble parts. Afterward they would go to a restaurant with their father for dinner.

Kardon graduated from Stuyvesant High School and studied engineering at Cooper Union, but quit there before earning a degree.

Kardon returned to school later in life. In his fifties, he received a BA in engineering from City College of New York in 1973 and a master's degree in electrical engineering from Fairleigh Dickinson University.

== US military service ==
During World War II, Kardon designed underwater sound equipment for the US Armed Forces while still working at Bogen.

He designed intercoms that allowed maximum intelligibility under the acoustic and psychological conditions of combat as well as systems that allowed direct voice communications from landing crafts a mile out to personnel on the shore. Kardon also designed sound equipment that fooled the enemy, causing them to waste reserves attacking non-existent threats. He also worked on sonar and voice communication equipment that allowed ships and convoy units to communicate while under radio silence.

Kardon also helped his father's Premier Instrument Corp. develop the Kardon cold weather 35mm camera for the US Army Signal Corps. The camera was designed and built to be fully operational at temperatures as low as 67 degrees Fahrenheit below zero.

== Consumer electronics career ==
=== Bogen Company ===
In 1937 Kardon was hired by the David Bogen Company, manufacturers of audio and intercom equipment. While working at Bogen, Kardon also served as Chief Engineer for his father's company, the Premier Instrument Corp.

Kardon moved up at Bogen, from Design Engineer to Chief Engineer and was finally named Executive Vice-president. While working at Bogen, Kardon met Sidney Harman, also a Bogen employee. During his 14-year tenure at Bogen, Harman moved from engineer to sales manager. He was later named general manager of the firm.

=== Precursors of high fidelity equipment ===
In the late 1930s, Kardon often helped recording engineers and professional musicians modify available public address amplifiers and speakers to better reproduce radio programs and recorded music.

Recognizing a nascent high-fidelity industry, Harman lobbied the Bogen company to develop an improved audio system for American consumers. Bogen wasn't interested so Harman left in 1953, taking Kardon with him. Naming their new company Harman/Kardon Inc., each invested $5,000 (equivalent to $60,168 in 2025) in capital.

=== Harman Kardon ===
Naming their new company Harman/Kardon Inc., each invested $5,000 (equivalent to $60,168 in 2025) in capital. Harman handled sales, merchandising, and advertising, while Kardon was Chief Engineer, Designer and Production Manager.

In 1954 their first product was the Festival D-1000 receiver, the world's first integrated hi-fi receiver. The unit included a wide bandwidth FM radio tuner, a pre-amplifier and 30-watt amplifier all in a complete chassis.

By 1956 Harman/Kardon was worth $600,000 (equivalent to $7,105,263 in 2025). Kardon left the firm in 1959 to become an independent consultant.

== Inventions ==
Kardon was granted a US utility patent for his invention, US 3,190,038 "Wetting Doll with Electrical Alarm" November 16, 1962.

== Later career ==
In 1961 Kardon was named Director of Engineering at Ultrasound Industries, Inc., a dental equipment manufacturer in Plainview, Long Island, New York.

== Family life ==
Kardon married Anna Jaffe on December 8, 1933, and had two children. Born as Bernard Kardon (no middle name), he added a middle name of Peterson (Peter's son, in honor of his father, Peter Kardon), which appeared in his obituary.
