= NAD Electronics =

British Electronics company

- Type: Private company
- Industry: Electronics
- Founded: 1972
- Founder: Dr. Martin L. Borish
- Headquarters: Pickering, Ontario, Canada
- Products: Hi-fi equipment
- Parent: Lenbrook Group
- Website: www.nadelectronics.com

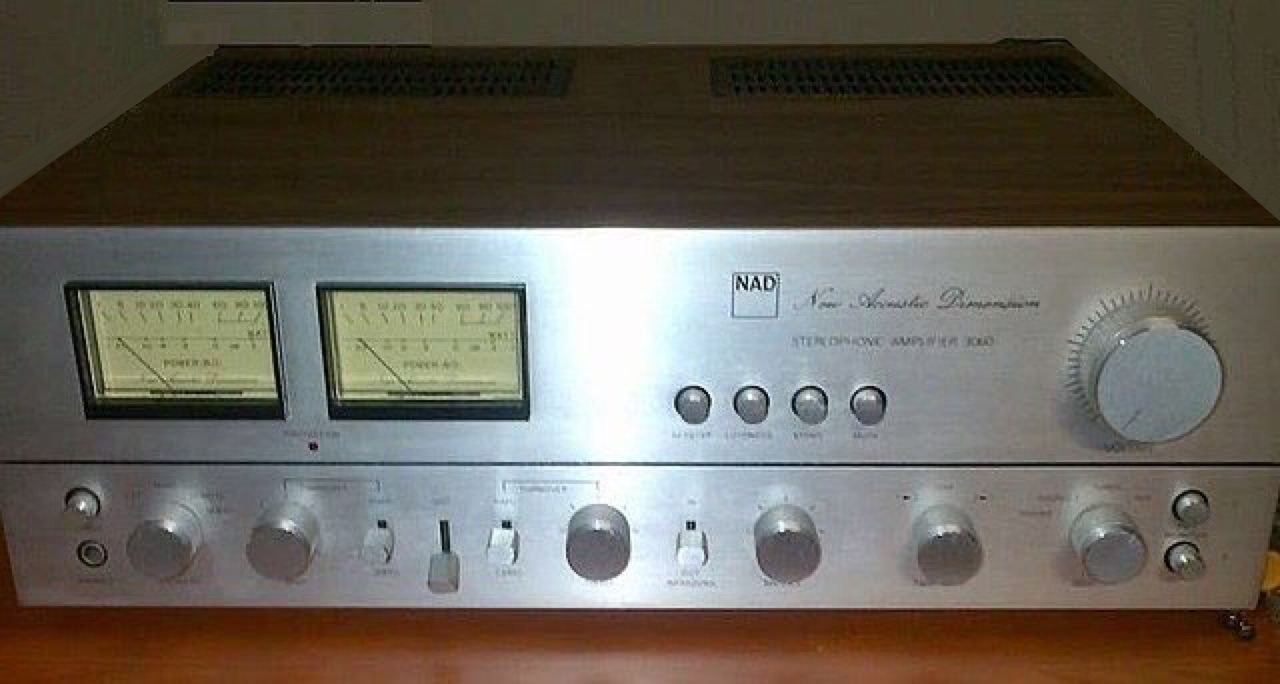
Integrated amplifier NAD 3060, 1978

The NAD 3020 integrated amplifier

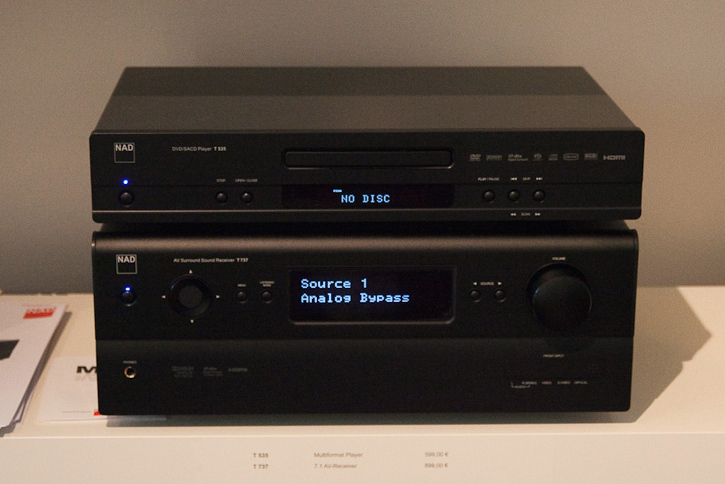
A/V-components, 2009 (at High End fair, Munich)

NAD Electronics (New Acoustic Dimension) is a brand name of an electronics firm whose products include home hi-fi amplifiers and related components.

In 1972, the company was founded in London by Dr. Martin L. Borish (1928–2017), an electrical engineer with a PhD in physics. Its most famous product is the late-1970s NAD 3020, an integrated amplifier designed by Bjørn Erik Edvardsen, which was highly regarded by various magazines in Britain.

NAD was one of the first audio manufacturers to outsource the manufacturing of its products to electronics factories in East Asia.

NAD was acquired by the Danish firm AudioNord in 1991 and subsequently sold in 1999 to the Lenbrook Group of Pickering, Ontario, Canada.

== Power-supply design ==
NAD focuses on the concept of effective power, potentially enabling delivery of dynamic power bursts far in excess of their rated RMS power. The key to this feature requires use of a flexible power supply which stores significant reserve current for quick release at moments of high musical load. Originally developed at NAD by Phill Marshall, NAD's various incarnations of his design have been associated with different names over the years including Power Envelope and recently PowerDrive.

Additional benefits of this approach include the fact that amplifiers using this technology can handle complex, real-life, lower-impedance loudspeaker loads as compared with the simple 8-ohm resistor typically used to calculate advertised power ratings and the fact that the circuitry in this approach requires less cooling, while maintaining ability to handle complex impedance loads as low as 2 ohms.

== NAD Technology in Bluesound ==
Two Bluesound amplified wireless streaming products, Pulse and Powernode, feature NAD direct digital technology. It is also integrated into their line of receivers, such as the NAD 758v3 and NAD 777v3.

== See also ==
- List of phonograph manufacturers
