= Harman Becker Automotive Systems =

Automotive equipment manufacturer

Harman Becker Automotive Systems GmbH
- Type: GmbH
- Industry: Automotive supplier
- Founded: 1949
- Headquarters: Karlsbad, Germany
- Key people: Michael Mauser, Udo Hüls (managing directors); Frank Groth (chairman of the supervisory board)
- Products: Automotive
- Revenue: 1,383 B Euro (2013/2014)
- Owner: Samsung Electronics
- Number of employees: 2,000 (2013/2014)
- Parent: Harman International Industries
- Website: www.harman.com

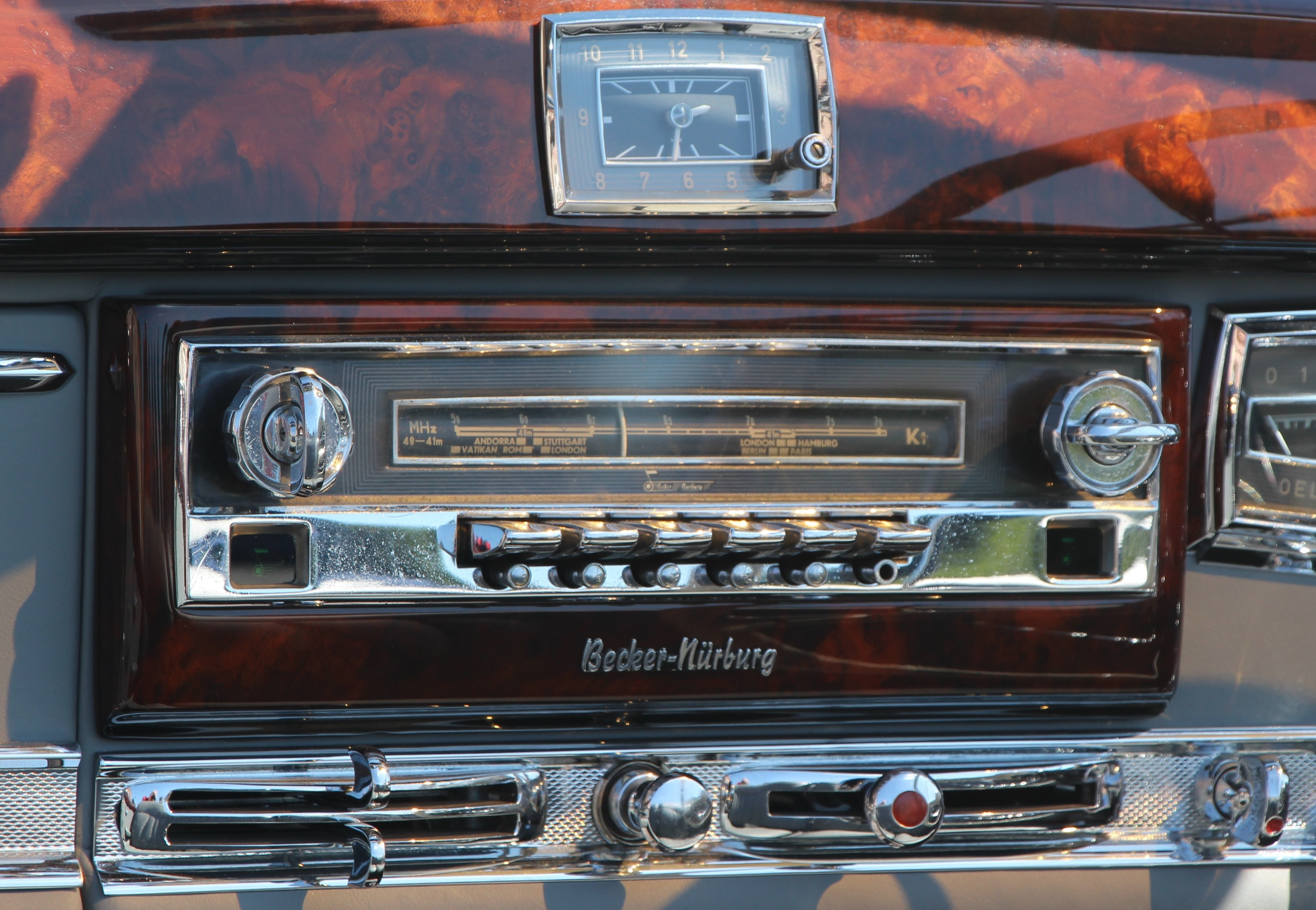
Becker Nürburg with Vacuum tubes and station keys, about 1950

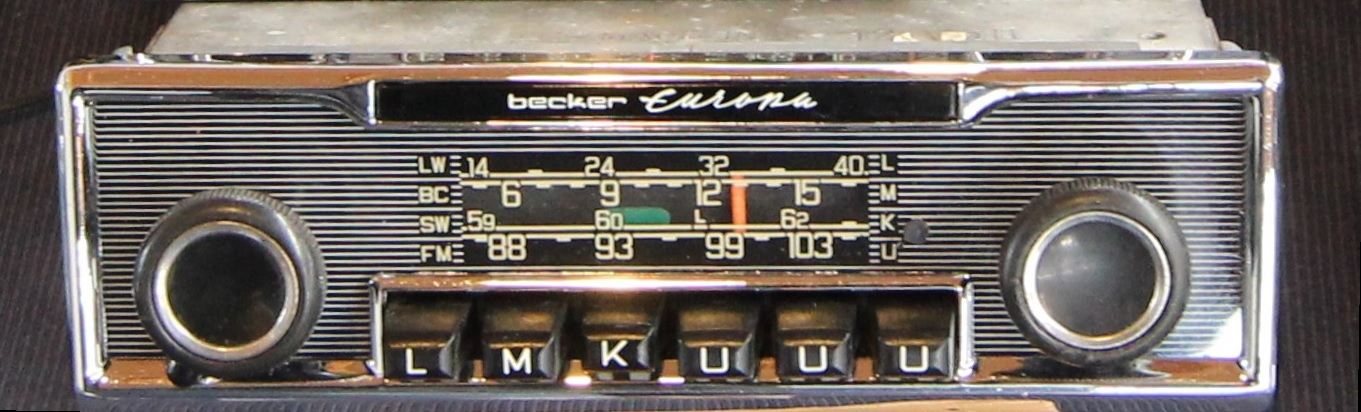
Becker Europa car radio

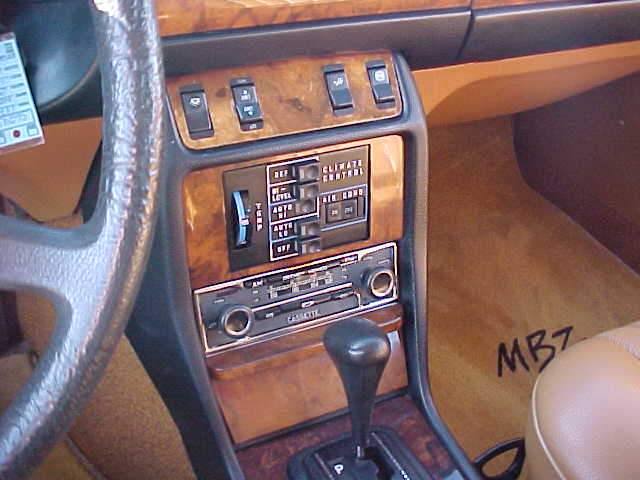
A Becker Mexico car radio with electrical search, produced since 1977

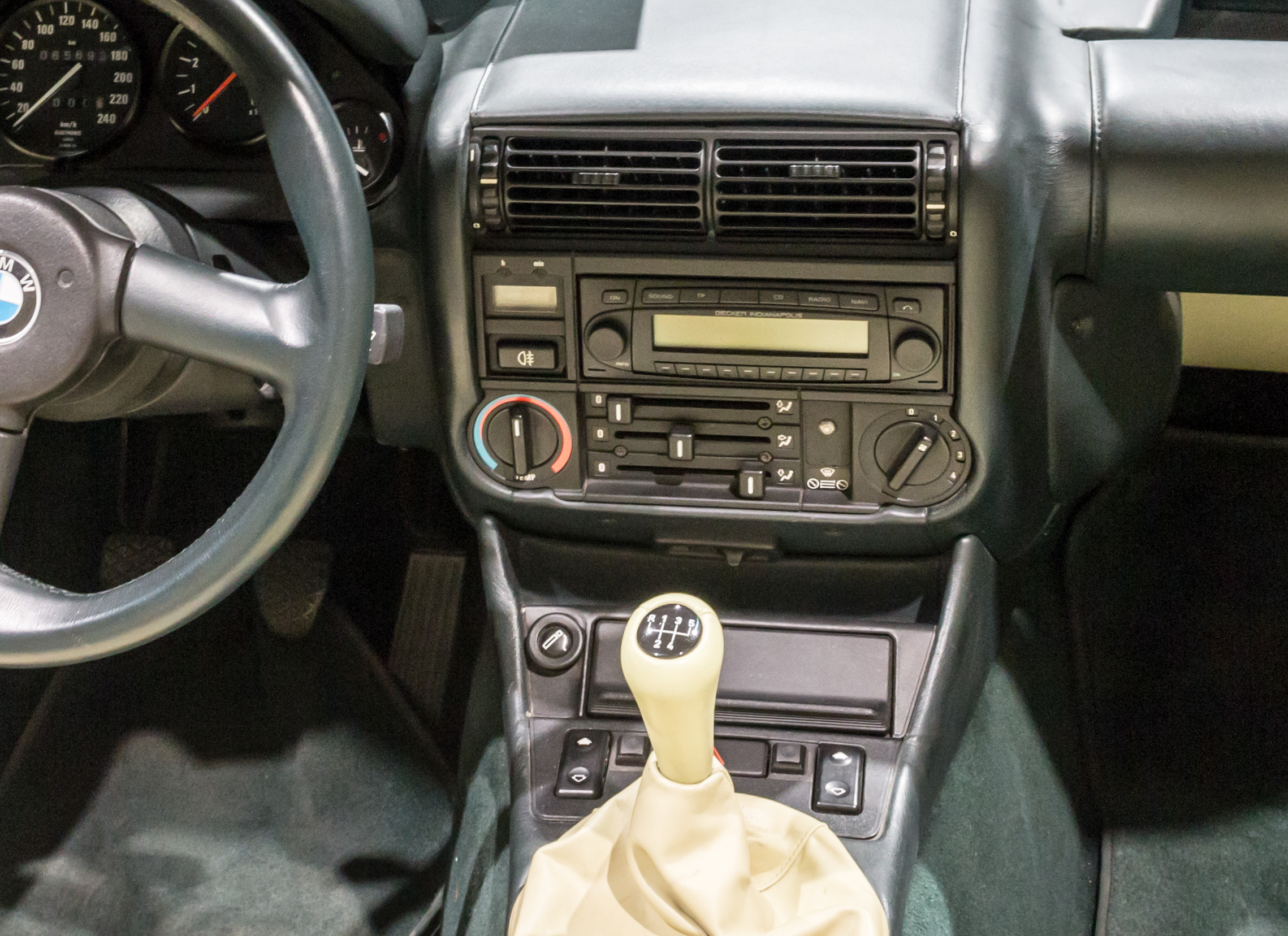
Becker Indianapolis with integrated navigation

Harman Becker Automotive Systems GmbH, commonly known as Becker, is a manufacturer of automotive electronic equipment. It is part of the car division of the American manufacturing company, Harman International Industries, a subsidiary of South Korean company Samsung Electronics.

== History ==
The present company goes back to the German car radio and navigation systems manufacturer, Becker. This firm was founded in 1949 from a repair workshop in the Baden town of Pforzheim. Its founder was Max Egon Becker (died 1983). Even the receiver Nürburg with vacuum tubes had mechanical station memories in the 1950s. In 1953 the first car radio with automatic search for stations was launched. In 1955 Becker started manufacturing aircraft radios. In 1987 Becker launched a CD car receiver. In 1995, the US concern, Harman International, took over the firm, apart from the aircraft avionics division, Becker Flugfunkwerke GmbH (later Becker Avionics, which as of 2021 remained under the control of Roland Becker, the son of the founder).

At the time Becker had 1,300 employees and two plants.

The company, with its head office in Karlsbad near Karlsruhe and other bases in the USA and Hungary, developed and integrated complete infotainment systems worldwide. Its product range runs from navigation systems, voice control and human-machine interfaces to audio and entertainment technologies. From its earliest days, Harman Becker Automotive Systems was a supplier to Mercedes-Benz, but also supplies other marques such as Audi, Peugeot, Hyundai and also Luxury Marques Ferrari, Rolls-Royce, Porsche, BMW and MINI. Worldwide, Harman Becker has 28 bases in Germany, USA, Great Britain, France, Sweden, Hungary, Canada, Mexico, South Africa (to 2008), Japan, South Korea and China. Since 11 January 2010, Harman Becker Automotive Systems has pulled out of the market for mobile navigation. The trademarks Becker Traffic Assist, Becker Traffic Assist Pro etc. were transferred to United Navigation. Under the latter's roof, the brands Falk and Becker continue to run.

Since 2008, as part of the strategy of its parent concern, Harman International, the company's divisions have been increasingly based in low-wage economies, so that the number of employees in its German facilities dropped from 3,800 in 2008 to 2,250 in 2013. The company sites in Hechingen, Villingen-Schwenningen, Schaidt and Hamburg (leading development of navigation software Innovative Systems, sold in 2008 to Neusoft China as Neusoft Technology Solutions) were closed down or sold off.

In November 2016, Samsung Electronics reportedly acquired Harman for US $8 billion dollars. The acquisition was completed on 10 March 2017.
