= Infinity Systems =

American loudspeaker manufacturer

- Type: Subsidiary
- Industry: Audio
- Founded: 1968; 58 years ago in Los Angeles, California, U.S.
- Founders: Arnie Nudell, John Ulrick and Cary Christie
- Headquarters: Stamford, Connecticut, U.S.
- Products: Amplifiers, loudspeakers, vehicle audio
- Owner: Samsung Electronics
- Parent: Harman International Industries
- Website: www.infintyspeakers.com

Infinity Systems is an American manufacturer of loudspeakers founded in Los Angeles in 1968 and headquartered in Stamford, Connecticut. Since 1983, Infinity has been part of Harman International Industries, which became a subsidiary of Samsung Electronics in 2017.

Infinity produces packages for a range of audio applications, including multichannel surround sound home theatre packages, in-wall home speakers, and marine applications. Other products include powered subwoofers and car audio amplifiers.

Infinity products are installed as an option on Hyundai and Kia vehicles, some Mitsubishi vehicles from the 1990s to 2006, and many Chrysler vehicles.

== History ==
Founded in 1968 by Arnie Nudell, John Ulrick and Cary Christie, Infinity has produced home and mobile audio products by employing innovative materials such as neodymium magnets, mylar diaphragms, and polypropylene cones. The company's first product was the Servo-Statik speaker system. Infinity had an ownership relationship with Eastern Air Devices, later known as EAD. This involved the consumer brand of KLH speakers, and Avid< Peerless drivers, and Kyocera/Cybernet (which produces electronics) In the late 1970s Infinity introduced the EMIT (electromagnetic induction tweeter) and EMIM (electromagnetic induction midrange) drivers. These were flat quasi-ribbons that worked to move air based on the principle of electromagnetic induction. The system used samarium–cobalt magnets, allowing for a very low ribbon driver mass-per-unit area. Variants were made, such as the EMIT-R (radial emit), the S-EMIT (super emit) and the L-EMIM (large emim). The IRS (Infinity Reference System) was an ultra-high-end system, selling at US$65,000 in the 1980s. It consisted of 72 EMIT tweeters, 24 EMIM midrange drivers, and twelve 12-inch polypropylene woofers in four towers.

In the mid to late 1970's Infinity made the Monitor II 4-way speaker using the unique Walsh Transmission Tweeter. The Walsh tweeter looks much like a conical Ice Cream Cone (a traditional shape for an American confection (food)). The principle for the cone shape is to cause the typically directional High Frequencies to be emitted form the cone surface in a 360-degree horizontal dispersion pattern. Said to enhance the listening. Each Walsh Transmission tweeter was handmade.

Nudell left to form Genesis Technologies, a high-end loudspeaker company, founded in Seattle in 1991. Genesis' original flagship system, the 1.2, retailed for US$235,000, and is basically an updated Infinity IRS system.

After the departure of Nudell, Infinity speaker designs took a more mass market-oriented approach. The efficient SM (Studio Monitor) series incorporated a polycell tweeter and graphite-impregnated midrange/woofers. While not as elaborate or high end as previous Infinity efforts, they filled a popular consumer niche.
