= A&R Cambridge Ltd =

British manufacturer of hi-fi equipment

A&R Cambridge Ltd.
- Company type: Private
- Headquarters: Cambridge Innovation Park, Waterbeach, Cambridgeshire, England
- Owner: Samsung Electronics
- Parent: Harman International Industries

A&R Cambridge Ltd. (Arcam) is a British manufacturer of hi-fi equipment based in the Cambridge Innovation Park, Waterbeach, Cambridgeshire, England. It was established in 1976 by science and engineering students from the University of Cambridge. Since July 2017, it has been a part of South Korean company Samsung Electronics through its American subsidiary Harman International Industries.

== Products ==
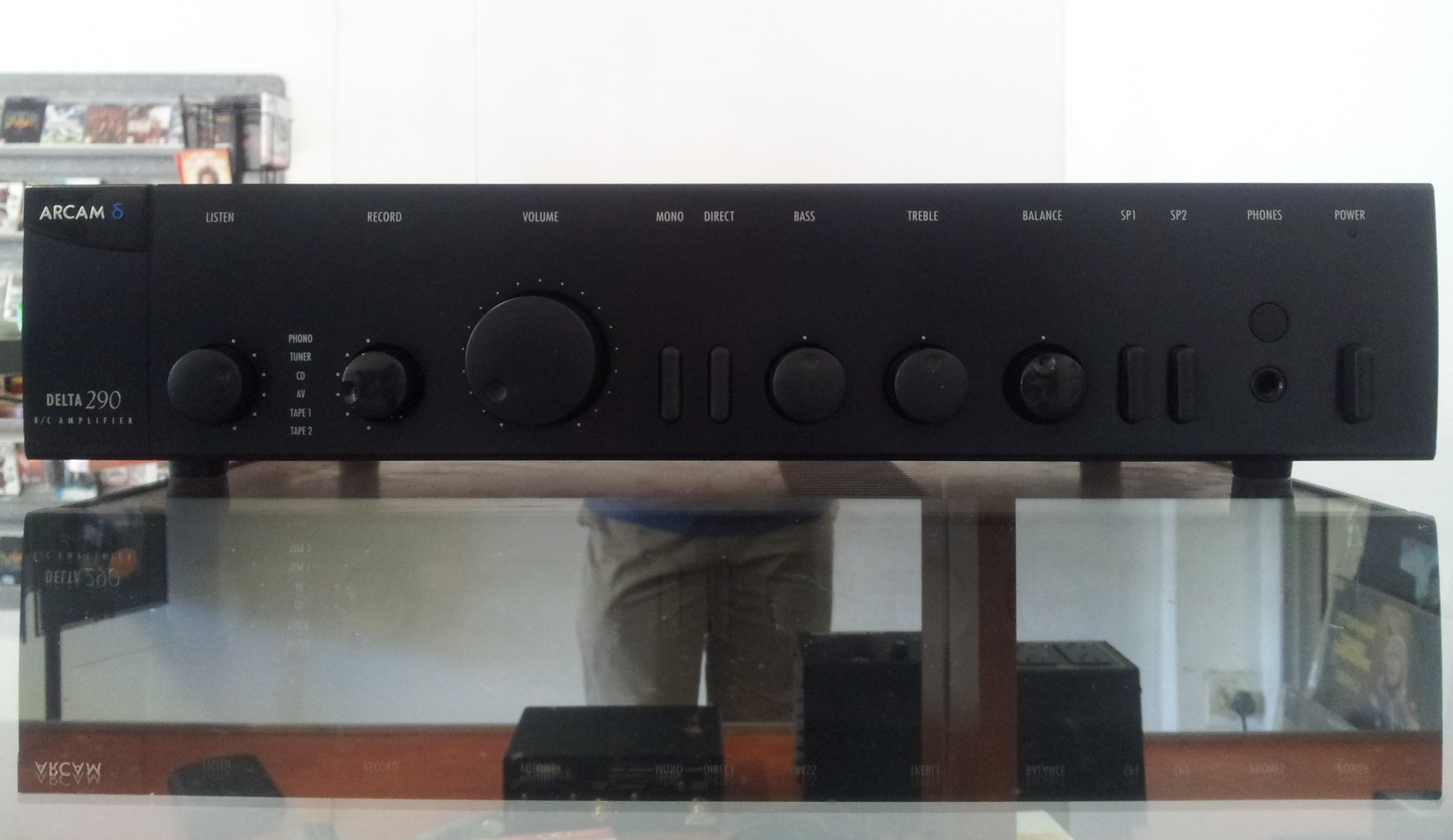
Delta 290 amplifier (1990s)

A&R Cambridge's first product was the A60 integrated amplifier, released in 1976, which soon became a classic, admired for its restrained, sleek appearance and its high-end sound performance. The name 'A&R Cambridge' was a shortened form of 'Amplification & Recording, Cambridge' which represented the initial operations of its founders, John Dawson and Chris Evans, who had been students at Cambridge University. In the 1980s, the name was shortened in literature to Arcam (displayed as ARCAM on products), although the company's trading name remained A&R Cambridge Ltd.

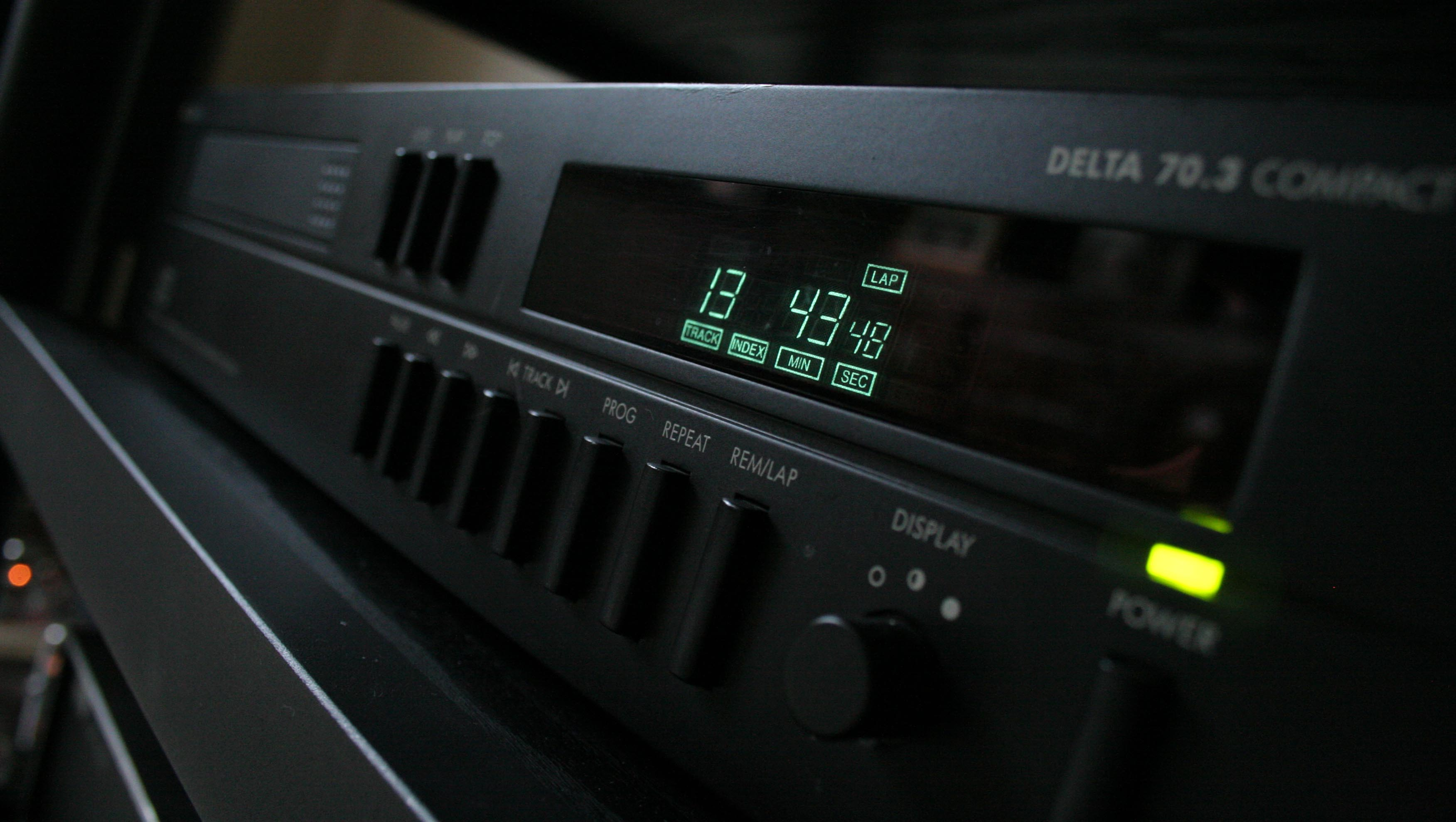
Delta 70.3 CD player

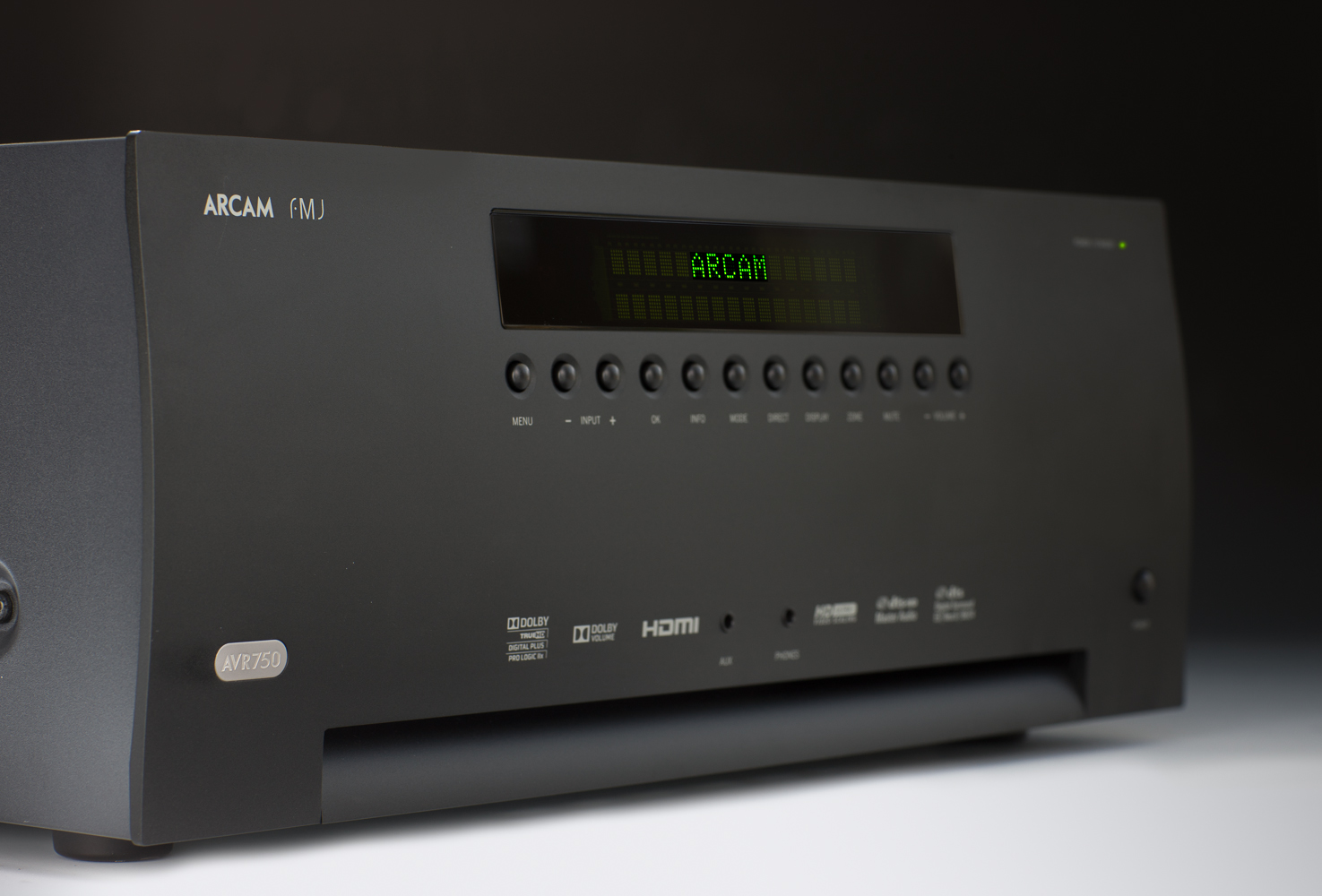
AVR750 AV receiver

Arcam's products range from integrated stereo amplifiers to high-performance AV processors and music players. Well-known ranges include the Alpha (entry) and Delta (higher) separates of the 1980s and 90s, the FMJ (Full Metal Jacket – referring to the casing) series, and the DiVA range of stereo and AV separates (1999 to 2005). By 2012 the range consisted of FMJ (now standing for Faithful Musical Joy) for the full size hi-fi and home cinema components, Solo for stereo music systems and rSeries for the lifestyle computer and streaming components such as the rBlink and the irDAC.

Arcam 'firsts' include the first domestic add-on audio DAC (Black Box), the first (and only) British-built Dolby S cassette deck (Delta 100 in 1992) and the first domestic DAB tuner (Alpha 10). The company was also a very early adopter of the HDMI connection standard for the outputs on its DVD players.

The company were also early adopters of the home cinema trend, launching a number of product ranges including the analogue surround sound Zeta products in the mid 1990s, followed by digital products in the Alpha, DiVA and FMJ ranges.

The ARCAM Solo, introduced in 2005, was the first system to place hi-fi quality separates into a one-box enclosure no larger than a separate CD player. This product also offered iPod integration via the rDock. This range was extended in 2007 to include a 5.1 AV variant, and later a 2.1 version and a smaller 'Mini' version. To complete the line-up, speakers were launched to match the Solo electronics. First were the 'Alto' two-way speakers for the stereo units, then a sub/satellite speaker system called Muso/Logo was released for the AV versions.

The company introduced its first portable hi-fi product, the rCube, in 2010, offering high quality sound, an iPod docking system, wireless music streaming and an 8-hour battery life. In 2012, Arcam expanded the rSeries to include the rPAC (a Personal Audio Converter) and the drDock (a digital dock for iPad and iPhone). Arcam also introduced a new integrated amplifier, the A19. In 2013, Arcam launched a new generation of 4k-capable AV receivers, the AVR750, AVR450 and AVR380, with a matching Blu-ray player (the BDP300) optimised for music playback. 2013 also saw the launch of Arcam's first Bluetooth product, the rBlink which utilised the latest Bluecore technology from Cambridge-based CSR plc.

Engineering and design of their products is managed in-house in Cambridge, England. Arcam's competitors include, amongst others, Linn, NAD, Naim, Meridian, Audiolab, Rega Research, Marantz and Cambridge Audio.

== Ownership ==
In November 2012, Arcam became a wholly owned subsidiary of JAM industries, based in Montreal, Canada.

In July 2017, Arcam became a subsidiary of the American company Harman, itself a subsidiary of Samsung Electronics.
