= Classé =

Classé is a Canadian audio brand known for high-performance music and theater components, such as amplifiers, pre-amplifiers and surround sound processors. The company was founded in 1980 in Montréal. Classé became part of the Bowers & Wilkins Group in 2001, and in 2018 it was acquired by Sound United, parent company of Denon, Marantz, Bowers & Wilkins, Polk, Definitive Technology, HEOS and Boston Acoustics. Classé components are designed in Montréal and manufactured in Shirakawa, Japan.

Classé amplifiers are used in both homes and professional recording studios like London's Abbey Road, and mastering facilities like Sterling Sound in New York City.
