= Joe Kiani =

American entrepreneur (born 1964)

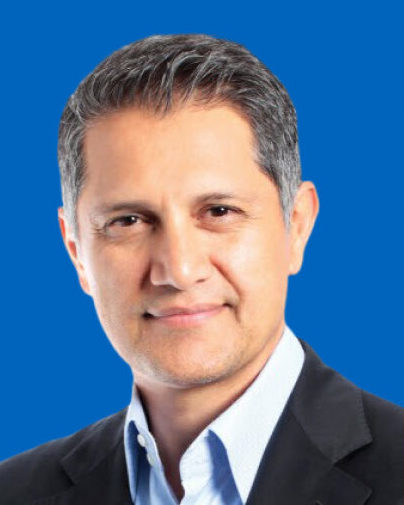
- Born: Massi Joseph E. Kiani; September 16, 1964 (age 62); Shiraz, Iran
- Education: San Diego State University (B.S.), (M.S.)
- Occupation: Businessman
- Title: Founder of Masimo and Willow Laboratories

Joe Kiani (born on September 16, 1964) is an American engineer, entrepreneur, and corporate executive. He is the founder of medical technology company Masimo, established in 1989, and Willow Laboratories, founded in 1998. In 2021, he was appointed by President Joe Biden to serve on the President's Council of Advisors on Science and Technology (PCAST). In 2024, Joe Kiani resigned as Masimo CEO after shareholders voted to remove him from the company's board. Kiani was subsequently sued by Masimo for allegedly conspiring with investment firm RTW Investments to manipulate the shareholder vote. Kiani is now the CEO of Willow Laboratories.

== Early life and education ==
Kiani was born in Shiraz, Iran on September 16, 1964. Joe Kiani immigrated to the United States with his family at the age of nine. Joe Kiani's father was an engineer, and his mother was a nurse. Arriving in the United States, speaking no more than three words in English, Joe Kiani graduated from high school at the age of fifteen.

Joe Kiani enrolled in San Diego State University (SDSU), receiving bachelor's (B.S.E.E) and master's (M.S.E.E) degrees in electrical engineering by the age of 22.

== Early career ==
Beginning in 1984, Joe Kiani worked as a CO-OP engineer at Burroughs in Rancho Bernardo, which later became Unisys. In 1986, he moved to Irvine and began working at Bell Industries and later at Anthem. In 1988, he began consulting for Newport Medical Electronics to build a low-cost pulse oximeter, where he discovered the motion artifact and low perfusion problems with pulse oximeters. He pitched the company a solution, which they declined. Following this, Joe Kiani left them and returned all the compensation they had given him. With a release he received from them, he founded Masimo in 1989.

== Career at Masimo ==
Kiani founded the medical technology company Masimo in 1989 and was later joined by partner Mohammed Diab. The company is publicly traded and employs more than 8000 people worldwide. Joe Kiani and Mohammed Diab invented measures through motion and low perfusion pulse oximetry, and they reduced pulse oximeter false alarms by over 90% while detecting more true alarms. Joe Kiani holds more than 500 patents or patent applications for advanced signal processing, optical sensors, and wearable technologies. Masimo pulse oximetry is used to monitor over 200 million patients worldwide.

In 2011, Forbes named Masimo one of the top 20 public companies with revenue under a billion dollars based on earnings growth, sales growth, and return on equity.

Pulse oximetry is one of the most commonly used monitoring technologies in healthcare. Masimo makes a pulse oximetry technology known as Signal Extraction Technology (SET), which is the first pulse oximetry technology to reliably measure through motion and low perfusion conditions.<r

Since its introduction in 1995, Masimo SET pulse oximetry in over 100 independent and objective studies has outperformed other pulse oximetry technologies, providing increased sensitivity and specificity. Masimo SET helps clinicians reduce severe retinopathy of prematurity (ROP) in neonates and improve critical congenital heart disease (CCHD) screening in newborns. As of March 2021, ten published CCHD screening studies, all with positive conclusions and representing over 300,000 infants, including the largest CCHD study, have used Masimo SET. In addition, a 10-year study from Dartmouth showed that Masimo SET eliminated death and brain damage in the post-surgical wards and reduced cost by over $1.5M a year due to over 50% reduction in rapid response activation and transfers back to the ICU.

In 2022, under Kiani's direction, Masimo acquired Sound United premium audio brands including Bowers & Wilkins, Polk Audio, Denon, Marantz, Definitive Technology, Classé and Boston Acoustics. After the $1B+ acquisition was announced, Masimo's stock dropped by 38%, resulting in a $5B reduction in market capitalization. After Masimo ousted Joe Kiani, they sold Sound United to Harman International, a subsidiary of Samsung Electronics, for just $350 million in May 2025.

After activist investors won the majority of the Board, including Joe Kiani's position on the Board, on September 19, 2024, Joe Kiani resigned as CEO and currently leads Willow Laboratories, a health and wellness innovator focused on diabetes, based in Irvine, California, which holds 127 issued patents, 48 pending patents, and technologies.

== Industry reform and patient safety initiatives ==
Joe Kiani is active in efforts to reform U.S. health care and encourage medical innovation. In 2002 and 2003, Joe Kiani testified in front of the Senate Antitrust Subcommittee regarding anticompetitive practices of Hospital Group Purchasing Organizations and dominant medical suppliers. His efforts led to new codes of conduct by GPOs that prohibited sole supply and bundling agreements of clinically preferred products. As a result, many new innovative companies were able to get GPO contracts and make their products available to hospitals and patients.

In 2010, Joe Kiani and Masimo provided $10 million in funding to create the Masimo Foundation for Ethics, Innovation, and Competition in Healthcare, which is dedicated to encouraging and promoting activities that improve patient safety and deliver advanced healthcare worldwide. Masimo Foundation supports third-party research, development initiatives, and clinical studies with an emphasis on transformative projects that seek to truly enhance patient safety and outcomes; helping to forge a world free of sickness, disease and inhumanity.

In September 2013, Kiani appeared before the Senate Health, Education, Labor & Pensions Committee and laid out five steps to help eradicate preventable patient deaths. That year, he also founded the Patient Safety Movement Foundation through the support of the Masimo Foundation. More than 200,000 preventable patient deaths occur each year in U.S. hospitals. The Patient Safety Movement is committed to reducing these deaths to zero by 2030. The foundation also convenes the action-oriented annual Patient Safety, Science & Technology summit. In 2017, at its 5th annual summit, the Patient Safety Movement Foundation announced that almost 70,000 lives had been saved and over 69 healthcare technology companies had pledged to share their data, helping to create an ecosystem for engineers to develop predictive algorithms that can help save even more lives. In 2020, the Patient Safety Movement Foundation was awarded a $5 million five-year grant from the Masimo Foundation to help advance its mission and expedite its efforts.

Joe Kiani, a staunch supporter of innovation, has not only testified regarding the US patent system, including at a Senate Hearing in 2023, but has stood up to very large companies to defend Masimo's intellectual property against companies such as Apple, Medtronic, and Philips.

== President's Council of Advisors on Science and Technology (PCAST) ==
In September 2021, Joe Kiani was named by President Joe Biden as a member of the President's Council of Advisors on Science and Technology (PCAST). During his tenure on PCASAT, Joe Kiani co-chaired the working group that published and presented recommendations on how to improve patient safety to President Biden, called "A Transformational Effort on Patient Safety".

== Honors and recognition ==
Joe Kiani has received numerous awards and recognitions throughout his career, including the Robert Wears Patient Safety Leadership Award in 2023, the City of Hope Let's Be Frank Humanitarian Award in 2021, and the Ibero American Society (SIBEN), Improvement of Neonatal Health in Latin America award, Presented at XVII Annual Congress, on November 16, 2020.

Joe Kiani was named an Honorary Member of the Mexican Academy of Surgery in Mexico City on June 6, 2019. In 2018, he received the IP Champion Award from the Intellectual Property Owners Association Education Foundation, and the Anti-Defamation League Humanitarian Award in 2017.

Additionally, Joe Kiani was named Innovator of the Year by the Orange County Business Journal, in 2017, and received the European Network Patient Blood Management Platinum Award the same year. He was named the SafeCare Person of the Year in 2015, and received the Chapman University Argyros Medal for Visionary Leadership & Commitment to Patient Safety in 2013.

Joe Kiani was named Ernst & Young National Entrepreneur of the Year – Life Sciences and Public Service Award Winner in 2012, and the San Diego State University honored Joe Kiani with the Monty Award in 2005. He was honored with the Adaptive Business Leaders Innovations in Healthcare Platinum "ABBY" Award in 2003, The March of Dimes Excellence in Leadership Award in 2001, and the Society for Critical Care Medicine (SCCM) Technology Excellence Award in 2000.

In recognition of Joe Kiani's innovations, the Board of Trustees of the California State University and San Diego State University awarded him the honorary degree of Doctor of Science

=== Philanthropy and civic engagement ===
In 2019, Kiani began serving on the advisory board of the University of California, Irvine Susan and Henry Samueli College of Health Sciences. In 2020, Joe Kiani joined actors Chris Evans and Mark Kassen in creating A Starting Point, a video-based civic engagement platform.

In 2021, Joe Kiani started serving as a member of the Board of Trustees of the California Institute of Technology (Caltech), the Board of Councilors of the Carter Center, and the chair of the Board Quality Committee of the Children's Hospital of Orange County (CHOC).
