= Nura (company) =

Australian consumer electronics manufacturer

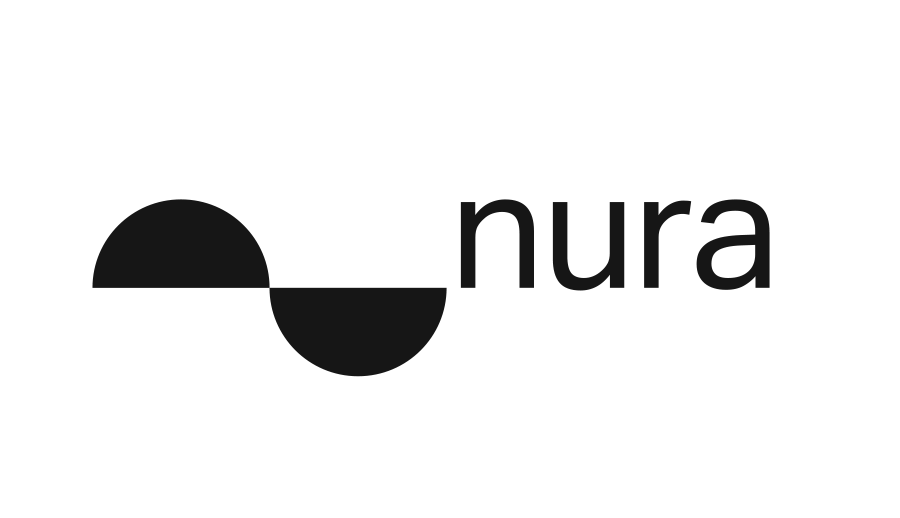
- Type: Privately held company
- Industry: Personalized Audio Technology
- Founded: 2015
- Founders: Kyle Slater and Luke Campbell
- Defunct: 2023
- Fate: Acquired by Denon
- Headquarters: Melbourne, Australia
- Products: Nuraphone
- Parent: Nura Operations Pvt. Ltd.
- Website: https://www.nuraphone.com

Nura was a consumer electronics company based in Melbourne, Australia. Nura designed and manufactured headphones with personalized sound technology. Nura's proprietary technology automatically measures the user's hearing sensitivities to different frequencies by monitoring sounds generated from the inner ear. This process takes 1–2 minutes. The headphones then adapt the frequency response to the user's sensitivities, allowing them to hear more detail when listening to music.

In October 2017, Nura launched their debut product, the Nuraphone.

In July 2018, Nura added active noise cancellation to their headphones via a software update.

In April 2023, Nura was acquired by Denon, a part of the Masimo Corporation, to integrate their personalized audio technology into Denon earbuds and headphones. Denon discontinued the sale of Nura-branded products shortly after.

== History ==
Nura was founded in 2015 by Kyle Slater and Luke Campbell.

=== Funding ===
Nura was able to develop their debut product, the Nuraphone, with funding from the Melbourne Accelerator Program, HAX (a hardware accelerator program based out of Shenzhen, China), venture capital, and the use of a crowdfunding campaign on Kickstarter. In 2015, the Melbourne Accelerator Program granted Nura an Entrepreneurial Fellowship, which provided monetary funding as well as office space and mentoring. In 2016, Nura joined HAX, and in the same year, they ran a crowdfunding campaign on Kickstarter to raise funds to begin mass production of the Nuraphone. The Kickstarter campaign ultimately raised $1.8 million (USD) from 7,730 backers to become the largest Kickstarter campaign in Australian history. In May 2017, Nura raised a $6 million (AUD) seed-funding round, which was led by Blackbird Ventures, with additional investment from SOSV, Qualgro, Sean Parker, Craig Barratt, the San Francisco 49ers and partners of Perkins Coie. The seed-funding round was followed by a $21 million (AUD) series A round also led by Blackbird Ventures.

=== Launch ===
Nura officially began operations on October 3, 2017, giving the general public access to the Nuraphone.

== Products ==
=== Nuraphone ===
The Nuraphone is a headphone that personalizes sound by measuring how the human ear responds to different sound frequencies and is patent-protected as the only consumer electronics headphone to do so.

==== Nuraphone /G2 ====
Nura released a free firmware update for the Nuraphone in July 2018 that enabled additional features such as active noise cancellation, audio pass-through, and enhancements to voice calls and button presses.

=== NuraLoop ===
In 2020, Nura released the NuraLoop wireless earbuds which repackaged the Nuraphone experience into a portable design intended to bring optimal sound performance to performers. The NuraLoop can be used both wired and wirelessly (16-hour battery life) allowing greater flexibility on the go. The NuraLoop was named an Innovation Award Honoree at CES in 2019.

=== NuraTrue ===
In 2021, Nura launched their latest product, NuraTrue, which are wireless headphones with the company's signature personalized sound technology. NuraTrue was listed in TIME's 100 Best Inventions of 2021 and awarded "Best Earbuds for Personalized Sound" in Rolling Stone Audio Awards 2022.

=== NuraBuds ===
Alongside NuraTrue, Nura launched NuraBuds exclusively on their subscription platform NuraNow in 2021. Unlike NuraTrue, NuraBuds cannot perform a hearing calibration, however a hearing profile created with any other Nura product can be imported onto the device.

== Design and technology ==
The Nuraphone's personalization works by monitoring the user's otoacoustic emissions and then adjusting sound based on the measurements, allowing the user to hear more detail when listening to music. The Nuraphone has a patented design (Inova) that includes both in-ear monitors and over-ear cups, and also features Tesla valves that circulate air through the ear cups to keep the user's ears cool during use.

== Awards ==
Nura won the Best of Innovation at the CES Innovation Awards 2018 for the Nuraphone. The product also won the Red Dot Award 2018 Best of the Best in the consumer electronics category, the 2018 Good Design Australia Award for best product design in consumer electronics, and the Gold at IDSA IDEA 2018 awards in the consumer technology category. In 2021, the NuraTrue was listed in TIME's 100 Best Inventions of 2021 in the Custom Listening category, and in 2022, it was awarded Best Earbuds for Personalized Sound in Rolling Stone's Audio Awards.
