= Zify =

French ridesharing company

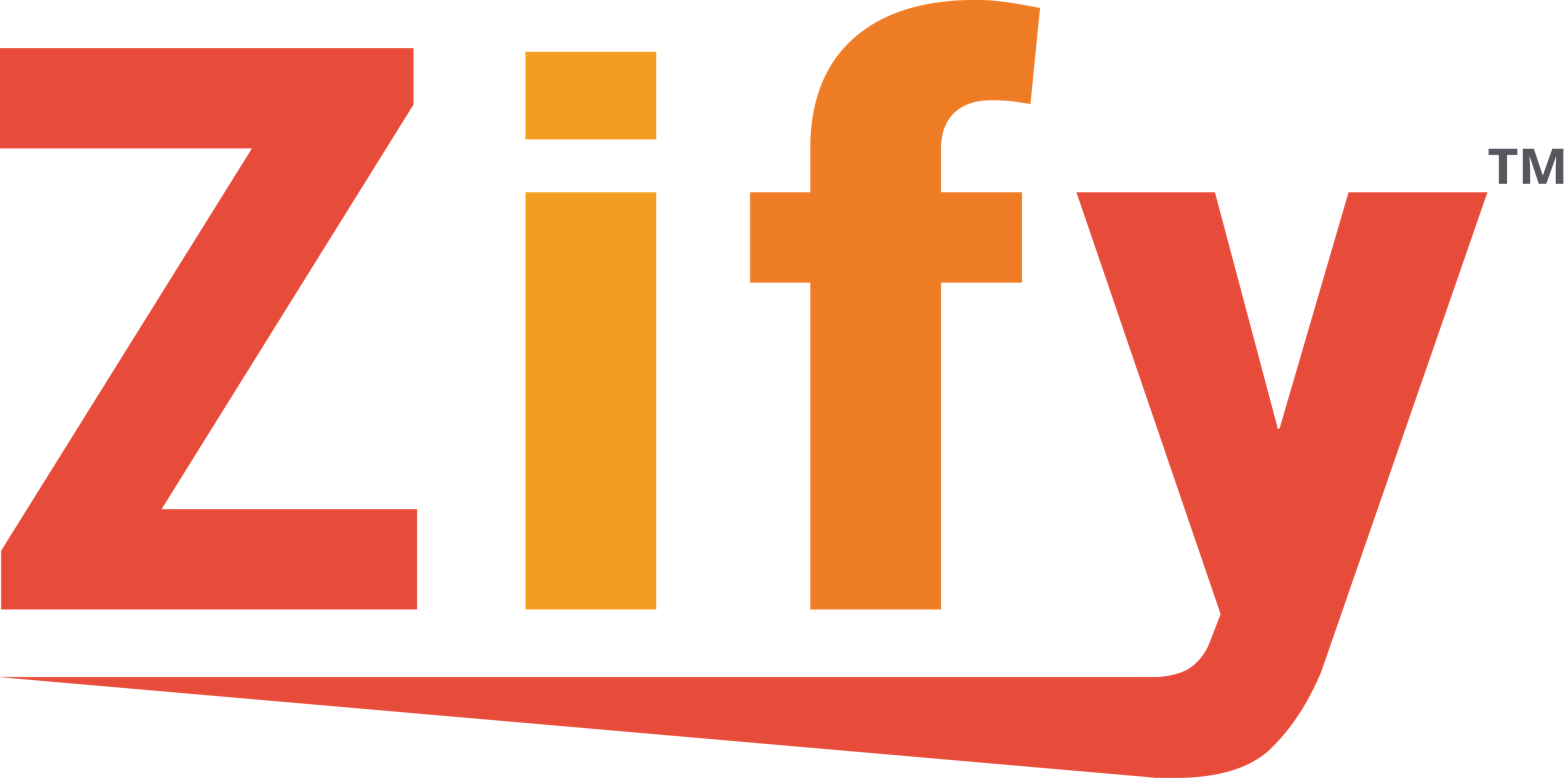
- Company type: Privately held company
- Industry: Vehicle for hire
- Founded: 2015; 11 years ago
- Founders: Anurag Rathor
- Headquarters: Paris, France
- Services: Carpooling
- Website: zify.co

Zify is a vehicle for hire and carpool service operating in Gurgaon, Hyderabad, Bangalore, Paris, and Berlin.

Zify allows car owners to share their planned route and offer available seats online, where passengers can request the rides. The passengers can select the car owners that they want to ride with, how much space and comfort they needed, where they wanted to meet and what they were willing to pay. The service could be accessed from a website or mobile app.

== History ==
Zify was founded in India in 2015 by Anurag Rathor. Rathor was previously working as a technology specialist with Wells Fargo, who used to offer ride sharing to the people standing at the taxi stands. After a few weeks, he realized that there is an opportunity for providing a last-mile connectivity and invested his savings to start a company. In May 2015, he raised a seed round during a TiE event in Hyderabad.

The company started operations in Hyderabad and worked on registering the car owners. The intention of the founders was to enable people with limited budget to travel and share the expenses. They focused on the security of the travellers and verify the details of the car owners before they can offer a ride sharing. In early 2017, they entered the European market and choose Paris to establish its headquarters. The company participated in the Ford Motor Company's Make It Driveable AppLink challenge and you as one of three winners, receiving €10,000 and got a chance to work with Ford.

In 2018, the company expanded operations to Berlin, Germany.

== Funding ==
Zify raised $190,000 in angel round backed by investors Sean O’Sullivan of SOSventures and two Hyderabad-based investors.

== Recognition and awards ==
In 2017, the company participated in the Web2day event and held the second place. The company was a part of 2017 Techstars Paris business incubator program.
