= Apple Watch health monitoring patent dispute =

Masimo v. Apple
- Court: United States District Court for the Central District of California
- Full case name: Masimo Corporation and Cercacor Laboratories Inc. v. Apple Inc.
- Citation: 8:20-cv-00048

Court membership
- Judge sitting: James V. Selna

In 2020, multinational technology company, Apple, entered into a patent dispute with health technology company Masimo and its subsidiary, Cercacor Laboratories, over alleged employee poaching attempts and patent infringement regarding the company's Apple Watches.

== Background ==
The Apple Watch is a smartwatch developed by Apple, debuting in September 2014. The watch accounts for US$20 billion of Apple's annual sales and a third of all smartwatch sales. In October 2013, Cercacor Laboratories chief technology officer, Marcelo Lamego, emailed Apple chief executive, Tim Cook, with an idea for a new technology. Lamego began working for the company several weeks after the email was sent and began requesting Apple file a series of patents related to pulse oximetry within months of his employment. According to Masimo, Lamego initially declined to join Apple during a meeting between Masimo and Apple executives in 2013, but reconsidered after Masimo chief executive, Joe Kiani, appointed another employee as the company's chief technology officer. Lamego resigned in July, 2014, after disputing with managers. According to Kiani, Apple hired thirty Masimo employees.

United States International Trade Commission bans may be vetoed by the President of the United States, or by the United States Trade Representative within sixty days of a ruling; vetoes are rare. In August, 2013, then-trade representative Michael Froman vetoed a ruling preventing the iPhone 4 and select iPads from being sold in a patent dispute between Apple and Samsung. Trade representative Katherine Tai upheld a ban regarding electrocardiography technology and AliveCor in Apple Watches in February 2023.

== Dispute ==
On January 9, 2020, Masimo and its subsidiary, Cercacor Laboratories, filed a lawsuit in the United States District Court for the Central District of California, alleging that Apple violated the company's light-based health monitoring patents. Masimo and Cercacor claimed that Apple's hiring of Cercacor chief technology officer Marcelo Lamego and Masimo chief medical officer Michael O'Reilly allowed Apple to gain a competitive advantage through their knowledge of Masimo's. The lawsuit seeks to block the use of Masimo's patents in the Apple Watch Series 4 and 5 and to seize seven patents issued to Lamego. Apple repeatedly filed to dismiss the allegations of obtaining trade secrets and filed petitions to invalidate Masimo's patents at the Patent and Trademark Office in September; Masimo accused these efforts of being attempts to delay the case in order to garner a greater share of the smartwatch market. In April 2023, deliberations began in the case. Judge James V. Selna dismissed the business and marketing claims against Apple and set the maximum fine against Apple at US$1.85 billion. The trial ended with a no jury verdict; the jury favored Apple, but a holdout juror refused to compromise.

In June 2021, Masimo expanded its lawsuit to encompass the Apple Watch Series 6, filing a complaint to the International Trade Commission to state that the Series 6 infringes five patents for Masimo's light-based pulse oximeters. The complaint was prompted by delays in the lawsuit, according to Masimo chief executive Joe Kiani. On October 26, 2023, the International Trade Commission issued an import ban against the Apple Watch Series 6, 7, 8, and 9 models set for December 26. Apple announced that it would halt sales of Apple Watch Series 9 and Ultra 2 models in retail locations on December 24 and online on December 21. The company has attempted to overturn the ban through software updates that would alter how oxygen saturation is determined. Apple lost an attempt to stay the ruling while awaiting an appeal and appealed the ruling to the Court of Appeals for the Federal Circuit. The federal appellate court granted Apple a temporary reprieve.

=== 2025 decision ===
In November 2025, a federal court in California awarded $634 million to Masimo from Apple. It was a jury decision. The issue concerns the pulse oximetry technology in used in the Apple Watch.

Apple stated that it disagrees with the verdict and will appeal this decision.
