= Polk Audio =

Manufacturer of audio products

Polk Audio, Inc.
- Type: Subsidiary
- Industry: Loudspeakers, Consumer electronics
- Founded: 1972; 54 years ago
- Founders: Matthew Polk, George Klopfer and Sandy Gross
- Headquarters: San Diego, California,
- Parent: DEI Holdings
- Website: www.polkaudio.com

Polk Audio, Inc. is an American manufacturer of audio products best known for its home and automobile speakers. The company also produces a wide range of other audio products, such as amplifiers and FM tuners. The company's headquarters is in San Diego, California. In 2006, it was bought by Directed Electronics. Polk Audio has also introduced smart speakers for Google Assistant and Amazon Alexa.

== Background ==
Polk Audio was founded by Matthew Polk, George Klopfer and Sandy Gross in 1972. The three first met one another while attending classes at Johns Hopkins University in Baltimore. After graduating in 1971, the team collaborated on producing a sound system for a local bluegrass music convention. Polk designed the speaker system, and Klopfer built the cabinets. After it was discovered the producers of the convention could not afford the system, Klopfer designed a logo for Polk Audio and attached it to the speakers. Gross organized the marketing of Polk Audio and helped build Polk's worldwide dealer network.

After spending a short period of time dabbling in professional audio, Polk Audio turned its attention to affordable high-performance home audio. With the release of the first successful model in 1974, the Monitor 7, Polk Audio was gaining recognition in audiophile circles. Polk Audio used a two-way configuration on almost all its speakers, such as the popular Monitor 10 and Monitor 12, typically with 6.5-inch mid/bass drivers with rubber surrounds and passive radiators. The Monitor 12 was quite capable for its day, having bass response to 18 Hz, a free-air mounted tweeter, and 500-watt RMS power handling. Later Polk speaker models used arrays of drivers—Stereo Dimensional Array (SDA)—to cancel the crosstalk from the left speaker to the right ear and from the right speaker to the left ear, so as to expand the stereo image beyond the space between two stereo speakers. The SDA effect is used in some current Polk speakers. The company also makes automobile speakers.

In early 2015, most or all of Polk's non-technical jobs were moved from the Baltimore office to the headquarters of the parent company, Sound United, in Carlsbad, California. At that time, Polk's engineers joined with those of Definitive Technology, and the Audio and Acoustics Research and Development [ARAD] center was established in Owings Mills, MD. ARAD remains the center for most loudspeaker development by Sound United, which also owns the brands Bowers & Wilkins, Classé, Definitive Technology, Denon, and Marantz. In 2022, Masimo acquired Sound United, later selling it to Harman International in September 2025.

== Products ==
- Passive Component Speakers for Home Theater and Hi-Fi Listening
- Powered Subwoofers
- Soundbar Systems with Wireless Subwoofers and Surround Speakers
- Outdoor, All-Weather Speakers
- Car and Boat Audio
- In-wall and In-Ceiling Architectural Speakers

== See also ==
- IP speaker
