= Masimo =

American health technology company

Masimo Corporation
- Type: Public
- Traded as: Nasdaq: MASI; S&P 400 component; (until 2026)
- Industry: Medical technology; Medical devices; Medical equipment
- Founded: 1989; 37 years ago
- Founder: Joe Kiani
- Headquarters: Irvine, California, U.S.
- Area served: Worldwide
- Key people: Michelle Brennan (chair); Catherine Szyman (CEO)
- Revenue: ▲US$2.09 billion (2024)
- Operating income: ▼US$−267 million (2024)
- Net income: ▼US$−305 million (2024)
- Total assets: ▼US$2.63 billion (2024)
- Total equity: ▼US$1.05 billion (2024)
- Number of employees: c. 3,600 (2024)
- Parent: Danaher Corporation
- Website: masimo.com

Masimo Corporation is an American health technology and consumer electronics company headquartered in Irvine, California. The company develops patient monitoring devices, non-invasive sensors, and related software platforms used in hospital and home settings. Masimo has also operated in the consumer audio and wearable device markets. In 2026, Danaher Corporation agreed to acquire the company for $10 billion.

== History ==
Masimo was founded in 1989 by engineer Joe Kiani; Mohamed Diab later joined as a co-developer.

The company became publicly traded in 2007 and is listed on the Nasdaq under the ticker MASI. In 2011, Forbes included Masimo in a ranking of small public companies in the United States.

In 2022, Masimo acquired Sound United, owner of audio brands including Bowers & Wilkins, Denon, Marantz, Definitive Technology, Polk Audio, Classé and Boston Acoustics. The company stated that the acquisition expanded its retail channels and engineering resources, and that it planned to use some audio products as connected hubs for its health-related services.

In October 2023, the United States International Trade Commission (ITC) ruled that Apple Inc. had infringed patents held by Masimo related to light-based pulse oximetry in the Apple Watch product line. Masimo stated that Apple had recruited some of its engineers after discussions about a possible partnership, while Apple said it had evaluated multiple vendors and did not select Masimo.

In September 2024, founder and CEO Joe Kiani resigned following a proxy contest involving an activist investor.

On May 7, 2025, Masimo announced an agreement to sell its consumer audio division to Harman International, a subsidiary of Samsung Electronics, for US$350 million.

In February 2026, Danaher Corporation agreed to acquire Masimo for $9.9 billion. The acquisition was completed on June 10, 2026.

== Technology and products ==
=== Signal Extraction Technology (SET) pulse oximetry ===
Pulse oximetry estimates arterial oxygen saturation ([[SpO_{2}]]) by comparing the absorption of red and infrared light. Motion and low perfusion can affect conventional pulse oximetry because venous blood movement may alter the signal.

Masimo’s Signal Extraction Technology (SET) uses signal-processing algorithms to distinguish arterial from venous signals and to estimate SpO_{2}, pulse rate, perfusion index (PI) and pleth variability index (PVI). Multiple clinical studies, mostly single-center or manufacturer-associated trials, have reported lower false-alarm rates and improved measurement stability compared with some earlier pulse oximetry systems, particularly in motion and low-perfusion conditions.

SET-based devices have been studied in neonatology, perioperative care and intensive care. Individual studies have reported associations between use of these devices and outcomes such as changes in the incidence of retinopathy of prematurity in preterm infants, detection of critical congenital heart disease (CCHD) in newborns, ventilator weaning practices, and rapid-response activations in hospital wards.

In 2011, the American Academy of Pediatrics and the U.S. Department of Health and Human Services recommended universal newborn screening for CCHD using motion-tolerant pulse oximeters validated in low-perfusion conditions. In 2012, Masimo received FDA 510(k) clearance for devices and sensors labeled for use in screening newborns for CCHD in conjunction with a physical examination.

In 2012, the National Health Service (NHS) Technology Adoption Centre in the United Kingdom included Masimo’s PVI among options for intraoperative fluid management technologies, and in 2013 the French Society for Anaesthesia and Intensive Care (SFAR) noted PVI in its guidelines on perioperative hemodynamic optimization.

=== Rainbow pulse co-oximetry ===
Rainbow pulse co-oximetry uses multiple wavelengths of light to estimate several parameters noninvasively, including total hemoglobin (SpHb), carboxyhemoglobin (SpCO), and methemoglobin (SpMet), in addition to oxygen saturation (SpO_{2}), pulse rate, perfusion index (PI) and pleth variability index (PVI).

Several clinical studies have evaluated SpHb monitoring in perioperative and critical care settings, reporting reductions in the proportion of patients receiving transfusions and in transfusion volumes when SpHb was incorporated into transfusion protocols. Studies in Emergency department settings have reported that SpCO monitoring may increase the detection of carbon monoxide poisoning and shorten time to diagnosis compared with some conventional approaches.

The Pronto-7 device for noninvasive spot-checking of hemoglobin, SpO_{2} and pulse rate received a gold Medical Design Excellence Award, and the World Health Organization listed noninvasive hemoglobin testing among technologies relevant to global health needs.

=== Patient and consumer monitoring ===
==== SafetyNet and Patient SafetyNet ====
Patient SafetyNet is a remote monitoring and notification system used on medical–surgical care floors. A study at Dartmouth-Hitchcock Medical Center reported a reduction in distress codes and intensive care transfers and estimated cost savings after implementing continuous monitoring with SET-based devices and Patient SafetyNet.

A 2020 retrospective study at Dartmouth-Hitchcock examining sedative- and analgesic-associated inpatient respiratory arrest found that, during a ten-year period in which continuous monitoring with Masimo SET was used, no deaths or severe morbidity from opioid-induced respiratory depression were observed in monitored patients. The ECRI Institute recognized Dartmouth’s use of the system with a Health Devices Achievement Award.

During the COVID-19 pandemic, Masimo introduced Masimo SafetyNet, a telehealth system for remote patient monitoring that uses sensors connected to smartphones, with data transmitted to a HIPAA-compliant cloud platform.

==== Rainbow acoustic monitoring ====
Masimo’s acoustic respiration monitoring technology provides noninvasive, continuous measurement of respiration rate using an adhesive sensor with an integrated acoustic transducer placed on the patient’s neck. Studies have reported that acoustic respiration rate monitoring has comparable accuracy and fewer false alarms than some respiration monitoring methods such as nasal capnography and impedance pneumography in selected patient groups.

==== SedLine brain function monitoring ====
SedLine is a brain function monitoring system that analyzes EEG activity from both hemispheres to derive an index of anesthetic depth. Research has explored its use in tailoring anesthetic dosing and assessing emergence from anesthesia.

==== Capnography and gas monitoring ====
Masimo offers mainstream and sidestream capnography and multigas analyzers for measurement of end-tidal carbon dioxide (CO_{2}), nitrous oxide (N_{2}O), oxygen (O_{2}) and volatile anesthetic agents in operating rooms, procedural sedation environments and intensive care units. A multi-center pediatric study reported that acoustic respiration rate had similar accuracy and precision to nasal capnography in certain settings.

=== Opioid-related monitoring and treatments ===
In June 2020, Masimo released Bridge, a neuromodulation device intended to reduce symptoms of opioid withdrawal.

In April 2023, the company received FDA De Novo clearance for a pulse-oximetry-based device designed to alert to respiratory depression as a potential early indicator of opioid overdose. The device was authorized for both prescription and over-the-counter distribution.

=== Smartwatches and wearables ===
In 2022, Masimo released the W1 smartwatch, which incorporates continuous physiological monitoring features and integrates with the company’s other monitoring platforms. The launch initially targeted a limited consumer release in the United States and telehealth providers internationally.
