= Marantz (disambiguation) =

Marantz is an audio equipment company.

Marantz may also refer to:

== People ==
- Alec Marantz, linguist
- Andrew Marantz, author and journalist
- Paul Marantz, lighting designer
- Robin Marantz Henig, writer
- Saul Marantz, an American musician and engineer

== See also ==
- Maran (disambiguation)
- Marand, a city in Iran
- Marans, a breed of chicken
- Marans, Charente-Maritime
