= Boston Acoustics =

American audio equipment manufacturer

- Type: Subsidiary
- Industry: Audio
- Founded: 1979; 47 years ago
- Headquarters: Woburn, Massachusetts
- Key people: Moses Gabbay (CEO)
- Products: Loudspeakers
- Parent: Sound United
- Website: www.bostonacoustics.com

Boston Acoustics was an American manufacturer of home and mobile audio equipment founded in 1979. The company produced speakers for home, custom/architectural, and car audio.

== History ==
Advent veterans Andy Kotsatos and Frank Reed founded the company in 1979. Andy Kotsatos was known as Andy Petite. His grandfather immigrated to the United States and worked as a waiter in a French restaurant. Because of his small stature, the rest of the staff named him Le Petit: French for small. Eventually bending to the social pressure to Americanize, he changed his name from Kostatsos to Petite. After founding Boston Acoustics and achieving success with the company, Petite changed his name back to Kotsatos.

The first Boston Acoustics speaker was called the A-100: a floor standing, very wide speaker, designed to minimize diffraction despite its very narrow depth. It was followed by the A150 floor standing speaker, and the A-70. Boston Acoustics marketed these speakers to audio specialty retailers and became highly respected for producing premium quality sound at very reasonable prices. The Boston-area retail chain Tweeter was one of the first and largest stores to sell them.

Boston Acoustics entered the mobile audio category in 1983.

Boston produced speakers for home, custom/architectural, and vehicles. They also produced OEM equipment factory-fitted to a variety of cars including Chrysler 300, Chrysler 200, Chrysler PT Cruiser, Chrysler Sebring, Dodge Avenger, Dodge Charger, Dodge Challenger, Dodge Magnum, Dodge Caliber, Jeep Commander, Jeep Grand Cherokee, Jeep Patriot and Jeep Compass vehicles. They also supplied the premium 9-speaker system in the 2010 Chevrolet Camaro.

Boston Acoustics produced home loudspeakers such as the E, HD, VR-M, VR, CR, Micro Reference, and Lynnfield Series, and on the mobile side Pro, Z, and SPZ reference component speakers.

In August 2005, D&M Holdings acquired Boston Acoustics. In March 2017, Sound United acquired D+M Holdings. In 2022, Masimo acquired Sound United, later selling it to Harman International in September 2025.

As inventory depleted, Sound United (the parent company of Denon, Polk Audio, Marantz, Bowers & Wilkins, Definitive Technology, Heos, Snell Acoustics, Boston Acoustics, and Classe), let Boston Acoustics fade away. Currently, Sound United maintains the brand name, but no engineering is budgeted and there is no future production planned for Boston Acoustics. Their last series included the A25 bookshelf speakers and A360 towers.
