= Morantz =

Morantz is a surname. Notable people with the surname include:

- Marty Morantz (born 1962), Canadian lawyer, businessperson, philanthropist and politician
- Paul Morantz (1945–2022), American attorney and investigative journalist

== See also ==
- Marantz (disambiguation)
- Regina Morantz-Sanchez, American historian
