= Marantz 2600 =

Stereo amplifier by Marantz

The Model 2600 was the most powerful stereo receiver made by Marantz, and one of the most powerful receivers of the "monster receiver" era of the 1970s, among the Technics SA-1000, rated at 330 watts per channel is #1[ref. technics sa-1000 official user manual]. tied for 2nd at 300 wpc with the Sansui G-33000 [ref. g-33000/g-22000 official user manual] is the marantz 2600 [ref. official user manual]. third is the Pioneer SX-1980 rated at 270 watts per channel,. The 2600 was rated at 300 watts RMS per channel x2 channels at 8 ohms and 400 W.P.C. at 4 ohms. This model was produced from 1978 to 1980 and is considered especially rare.

== Physical ==
The Model 2600 is 49 cm wide 18 cm high and 43 cm deep and weighs 27.4 kg (19 1/4" wide 7" high and 17 1/8" deep and weighs 60.3 pounds). It consumes 920 watts at its rated power output.
