= Over-the-Counter Hearing Aid Act of 2017 =

Over the Counter Hearing Aid Act of 2017
- Long title: FDA Reauthorization Act of 2017 SEC. 709. Regulation of Over-the-Counter Hearing Aids.
- Acronyms (colloquial): OTC Hearing Aid Act
- Enacted by: the 115th United States Congress
- Effective: August 18, 2017

Citations
- Public law: Pub. L. 115–52 (text) (PDF), Sec 709

Codification
- Acts amended: Federal Food, Drug and Cosmetic Act
- Titles amended: 21 U.S.C.: Food and Drugs

Legislative history
- Introduced in the House and Senate as H.R. 1652, S. 670, and H.R. 2430 by Joe Kennedy III (D–MA), Elizabeth Warren (D–MA), Greg Walden (R–OR) on March 21, 2017; May 16, 2017; Committee consideration by United States House Energy Subcommittee on Health, United States Senate Committee on Health, Education, Labor and Pensions; incorporated as rider on the FDA Reauthorization Act of 2017; Passed the House on July 12, 2017 (passed without objection); Passed the Senate on August 3, 2017 (passed voice vote); Signed into law by President Donald Trump on August 18, 2017

The Over-the-Counter Hearing Aid Act of 2017 (OTC Hearing Aid Act) was a law passed by the 115th United States Congress as a rider on the FDA Reauthorization Act of 2017. It created a class of hearing aids regulated by the Food and Drug Administration (FDA) available directly to consumers without involvement from a licensed professional (like an audiologist, otolaryngologist, or audiometrist). Regulations for this new class of hearing aid are expected to be released by the end of 2020.

== History ==
Hearing loss affects approximately 466 million individuals worldwide and is most concentrated among older adults. Approximately half of adults in the US age 60+ have some degree of hearing loss. Despite hearing loss' impact on communication, social functioning, and economic productivity across the life course, hearing aid uptake is no higher than 50% - even in settings where costs are covered by insurance. Barriers to addressing hearing loss in the U.S. include stigma, financial costs, and navigating a confusing array of healthcare providers and products to diagnose and treat hearing impairment. In the years leading up to the OTC Hearing Aid Act, the U.S. Institute of Medicine, U.S. National Academies of Science, Engineering and Medicine, President's Council of Advisors on Science and Technology, and U.S. Federal Trade Commission convened committees and workshops examining interventions to increase awareness of hearing loss as a public health problem, and improve access to acceptable, safe, and effective treatment options. From these workshops, allowing direct sale of regulated hearing aids produced by consumer electronics companies emerged as a strategy to promote increased access to hearing loss treatments. In March 2017, Representative Joe Kennedy III (D–MA) and Senator Elizabeth Warren (D–MA) introduced Over-the-Counter Hearing Aid bills in the U.S. House of Representatives and Senate, respectively. These bills were incorporated into the FDA Reauthorization Act of 2017 which was ratified in August 2017.

== Provisions ==
The law defined the newly created category of OTC hearing aids as devices using air conduction and/or wireless air conduction to improve hearing among adults with "perceived mild to moderate hearing impairment." Devices that modify or amplify sound for people with normal hearing (like noise-cancelling headphones or game ears) are not classified as OTC hearing aids. To ensure safety and effectiveness, the FDA was charged with developing functional guidelines; labeling and marketing standards; and conditions of sale. The Act required the U.S. Department of Health and Human Services to document adverse events associated with OTC hearing aids. The FDA was further tasked with implementing rules regarding the extent of pre-marketing approval required before OTC hearing aids can be sold commercially.

== Implementation ==
In October 2018, the FDA approved the first regulated direct-to-consumer hearing aid, the Bose Hearing Aid, under de-novo premarket review pathway provisions established in the Food and Drug Administration Modernization Act of 1997 and 21st Century Cures Act; regulations under the OTC Hearing Aid Act were not yet published. One year later, the FDA deemed certain Class I and Class II hearing aid-related diagnostic tests and devices exempt from 510(k) pre-market notification requirements. The entry of additional regulated OTC hearing aids, and evaluation of adverse events associated with these devices were to be forthcoming. Regulations for the new class of hearing aid were originally supposed to be released by August 2020, but the FDA delayed them reportedly due to efforts focusing on COVID-19. The new deadline for the release of regulations was expected to be the end of 2020.

== Reception ==
The OTC Hearing Aid Act provisions were met with both support and concern regarding their effects on consumer safety, patient care, and hearing-related professions. Some advocacy organizations, consumer electronics companies, and trade organizations supported the Act, citing telehealth advances, competitive pricing, and recent device improvements as opportunities to widen access to hearing loss treatments. At the same time, the absence of a clear regulatory pathway detailing manufacturing, safety, and effectiveness standards for OTC hearing aids was raised as a barrier to successful roll-out of OTC hearing devices.

Detractors maintained that the current unmet need in hearing loss treatments will not be met by regulating OTC hearing devices. Members of the public and hearing-related professional organizations expressed concerns over the prudence of creating a potentially sub-par class of devices in the absence of evidenced-based practices in patient-directed diagnosis and treatment. Critics also charged that given their lower level of regulation, OTC devices have greater potential to be misused and damage brain function. Critics also noted that in its current form, the Act omits support from licensed professionals, which has been found to improve patient satisfaction and product retention. Patient advocates noted that the Act does nothing for individuals with moderately-severe to profound hearing loss. Additionally, it was proposed that the creation of an OTC hearing device class may motivate insurance carriers to drop hearing aid coverage altogether.

== See also ==
- 21st Century Cures Act
- Food and Drug Administration Modernization Act of 1997
- Hearables
- Hearing aid
- Hearing loss
- Personalised sound
- Personal sound amplification product
- U.S. Food and Drug Administration
