= Marantz HD77 =

Loudspeakers

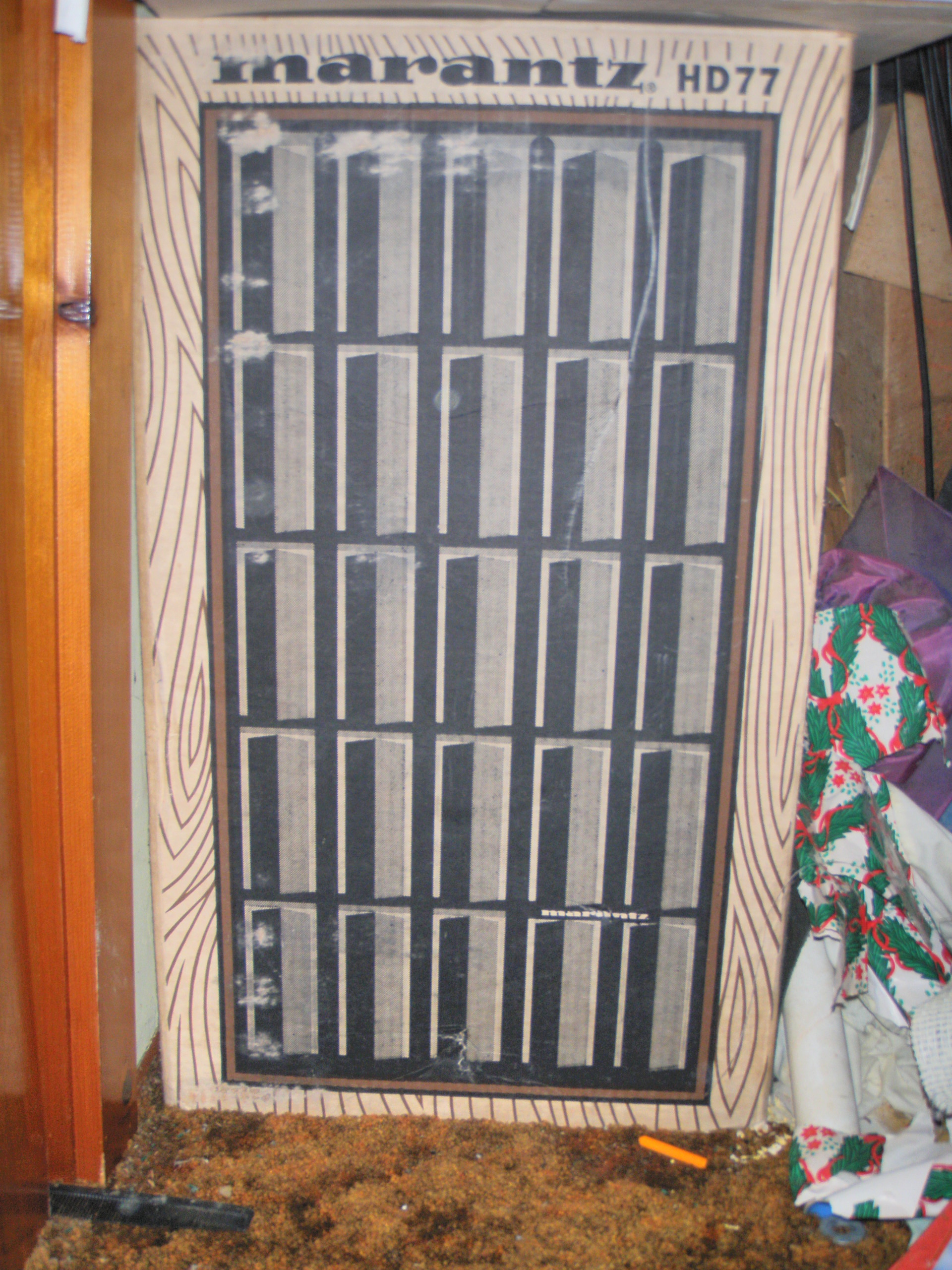
Box the speakers were packaged in; showing foam grille

HD77 is a model name of Marantz 4-way high-fidelity loudspeakers produced during the mid-1970s. They were bass reflex speakers but came with a cylindrical piece of foam which fit into the bass-reflex port of the enclosure, allowing listeners to achieve more accurate bass response similar to that of airtight speaker boxes. Although this configuration wasn’t fully airtight in theory— technically considered aperiodic—the plug used was actually made of closed-cell foam, which did seal the cabinet completely. The plug was cut slightly larger than the port opening, and when inserted and tightened with a retainer screw, it compressed to create an airtight seal, effectively converting the speaker into an acoustic suspension type.

The HD77 was designed by former JBL engineer Edmond May. The speaker’s front baffle included resistive potentiometer controls that adjusted the response curve of each driver from soft to bright, offering great versatility and allowing users to tailor the sound to a wide range of listening environments.

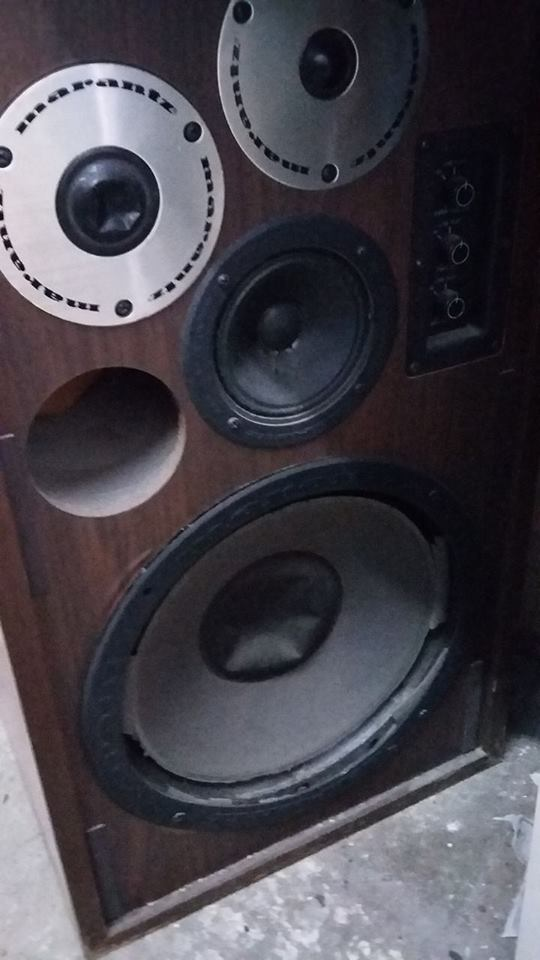
HD77 before repair

== Technical details ==
Weight: 49 lb (21 kg)

Power handling: 250 watts RMS, 330 Watts peak

Impedance: 8 ohms

=== Physical dimensions ===
Marantz HD77s had a total volume of 2.8 cubic feet (79 L) each. The cabinet dimensions are:

Depth: 12 inches

Width: 15 inches

Height: 28.5 inches

=== Drivers ===
The four drivers of the Marantz HD77s are a woofer, mid-range, tweeter and super tweeter. The given frequency responses are what the crossover circuit feed to each speaker, not what each speaker would respond to with no crossover circuit(full spectrum). The mid-range, tweeter and super tweeter have crossover controls for switching between a laboratory "flat" +/- 0db neutral response and a "room EQ" response. Tested frequency response is measured in an anechoic chamber from 20 Hz to 20 kHz, and displayed in a graph shown in original Marantz brochure. Crossover and frequency response are two different things. Crossover points are established for each driver and their specified frequency range. Without crossover points, the drivers would distort and likely overheat and burn out due to the production of the full spectrum of frequencies, with exception of the woofer which inherently struggles with producing higher frequencies. The drivers together create a complete spectrum frequency response.

==== Woofer ====
The woofer is 12 inches (30 cm) in diameter with a frequency response of 30 to 500 hertz.

==== Mid-range ====
The mid-range is 4.5 inches in diameter with a frequency response of 500 hertz to 3 kilohertz.

==== Tweeter ====
The tweeter is a 2-inch (5.1 cm) LPF film dome-type. The tweeter's frequency response is from 3 kHz to 8 kHz.

==== Super tweeter ====
The super tweeter is a 1-inch LPF film dome with response from 8 to 23 kHz, which extends 3 kHz above the nominal range of audio frequencies which can be heard by the human ear.
