= Marantz PMD-660 =

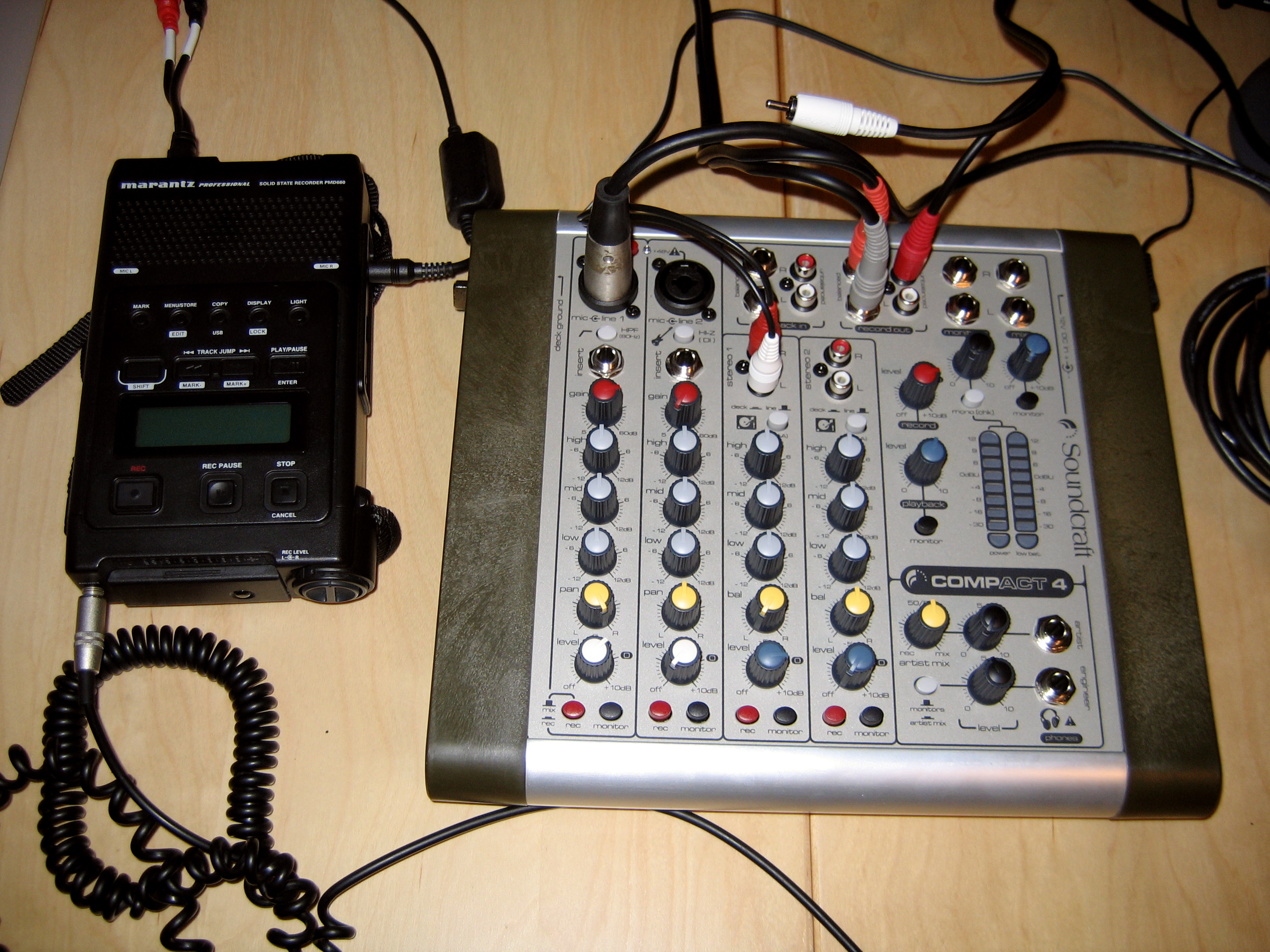
the Soundcraft Compact4 mixer and Marantz PMD660 digital recorder

Manufactured by Marantz, the Marantz PMD-660 is a portable, solid-state, compact flash audio field recorder. It has 2 XLR (balanced) inputs, 2 line-in inputs, 2 internal microphones and can record in raw WAV or MP3 formats. It is powered with four (non-rechargeable) AA-sized batteries which offers 3.5 to 4 hours of uninterrupted recording.

== Uses ==
As a field recorder, the PMD-660 is designed to be used outside of a controlled studio environment. Uses are electronic news gathering (ENG), podcasting, live music recording.
