= Carma =

Irish transportation technology company

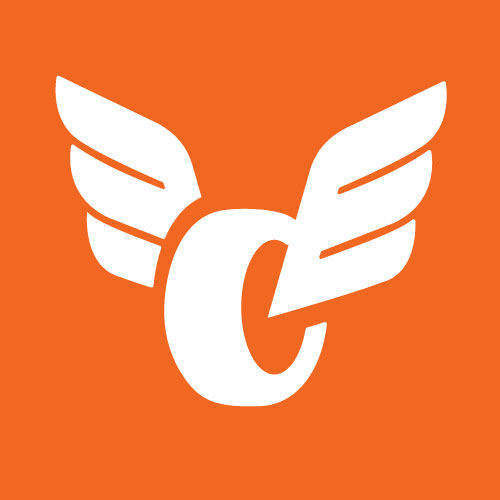
- Formerly: Avego
- Type: Private
- Industry: Carpooling, Ridesharing company, Software, Geographic Information Systems
- Founded: February 2007; 19 years ago
- Founder: Sean O'Sullivan
- Headquarters: Cork, Ireland
- Products: Carma Carpooling
- Number of employees: 50+
- Website: gocarma.com

Carma Technology Corporation is a real-time transportation technology company headquartered in Cork, Ireland. Its flagship product, Carma Carpooling, matches users with nearby commuters and enables them to share the cost of driving. Carma also has offices in San Francisco, California and Austin, Texas.

== Company history ==
Formerly known as Avego, the company was founded in 2007 by Sean O'Sullivan as a research and development division of the company Mapflow. In April 2009, Avego became a separate entity associated with University College Cork. Its real-time carpooling service first served the University community in the form of an iPhone application, with seats priced by mileage.

In January 2011, Avego and the Washington State Department of Transportation launched a pilot carpool program, called "go520," serving the Washington State Route 520 corridor outside Seattle. Financial subsidies of $30 monthly were available to both drivers and riders for the duration of the pilot.

In October 2011, Avego began a carpooling pilot in the Arlington, Potomac Yard area.

In mid-2012, Avego implemented the largest carpooling project to date in Santa Barbara, Sonoma County, Contra Costa County, and Marin County, California. It was administered by Caltrans and the MTC.

In August 2013, the company changed its name to Carma, unveiling a new corporate identity in the process.

In February 2014, Carma introduced an automated tolling discount program for carpoolers in Austin, Texas, in conjunction with the Central Texas Regional Mobility Authority (CTRMA). After unprecedented success, the tolling initiative then expanded to Austin's Manor Expressway in May 2014.

In June 2014, Carma opened up its API to third-party developers and unveiled the Carma Prize Fund – a $2.5m stimulus program aimed at boosting ridesharing activity around the world.

== Product areas ==
=== Overview ===
Carma produces real-time information and management systems that use GPS, GSM, Geographic Information System, Internet and iPhone technologies to facilitate a shift from single-occupancy vehicles to sustainable transport.

=== Carma Carpooling ===
Carma's flagship product is a carpooling app that matches drivers and riders, enabling people to make car transportation more efficient and affordable. The company states on its website that Carma's mission is "to enable people around the world to break free from the tyranny of the modern commute".

=== Fees ===
According to the Carma Terms of service, proceeds of the rider(s) payment (consisting of fixed charge per trip and a variable per mile fee) is split between the driver (85%) and the company (15%).

=== Smartphone App ===
The company introduced its "Shared Transport" app at the DEMOfall 2008 conference in September 2008. It enables on-demand carpooling. It works by automatically matching a driver's spare seat capacity with a passenger's desire to travel the same route at the same time. Drivers are provided with a price incentive in the form of electronic micropayments from riders at the end of each journey. In December 2008, the iPhone app was released as a free download at Apple's App Store and was featured prominently in the New York Times and other major media outlets.

In April 2010, the app was awarded the ITS America Smart Solutions Spotlight Award by the Intelligent Transportation Society of America.

== See also ==
- Shared transport
- Automatic vehicle location
