= HAX Accelerator =

Venture capital accelerator

HAX
- Company type: Subsidiary
- Industry: Venture Capital
- Founded: 2011
- Founder: Cyril Ebersweiler; Sean O'Sullivan
- Headquarters: Newark, New Jersey, United States
- Number of locations: 5
- Services: Investment
- Parent: SOSV
- Website: www.hax.co

HAX (formerly HAXLR8R) is a pre-seed, startup development program specializing in hard tech startups and headquartered in Newark, New Jersey. The 35,000-square-foot (3,300 m^{2}) facility houses machine shops and mechanical, chemical, and electronics labs to support founders working on sustainability tech across climate, industrial automation, and human health. Operated by the U.S. venture fund SOSV, HAX also has offices in Pune, Shenzhen, San Francisco, and Tokyo.

== History ==
Founded in 2011 by Cyril Ebersweiler and Sean O'Sullivan, the first HAX program ran in Shenzhen from March to June 2012. More than 257 startups have completed the program.

In September 2021, the New Jersey Economic Development Authority (NJEDA) announced a partnership with SOSV to provide $25 million over five years to build the new HAX headquarters in Newark in exchange for launching 100 hard tech startups focused on health tech and "re-industrialization and decarbonization of the U.S." The new HAX office opened officially on April 30, 2024, at an event featuring New Jersey Governor Phil Murphy.

Startups accepted into the HAX program receive an initial investment of $250,000 - $500,000 in pre-seed funding from SOSV and join a collaborative residency in Newark supported by staff design and engineering teams. Once HAX companies complete the program, they typically raise series seed and later stage venture rounds, in which SOSV usually participates.

Companies affiliated with the HAX program include:

- Formlabs, a 3D printing company
- Opentrons, open-source, lab automation
- unSpun, 3D weaving technology for apparel for on-demand production
- Neptune Robotics, robotic ship hull cleaning
- Flow Neuroscience, addressing depression with transcranial direct-current stimulation
- Voltstorage, grid-level energy storage based on redox flow storage battery technology
- Allozymes, platform technology to rapidly develop novel enzymes
- Smartex, automated AI-based Inspection for circular knitting machines
- Green Li-ion, lithium-ion battery recycling
- SepPure Technologies, sustainable chemical separation
- R-Zero, building monitoring and automated air and surface disinfection
