= Denon dl103 =

Phono cartridge

Denon DL103 is an MC (moving coil) phono cartridge made by DENON company.

The DL103 was designed for professional broadcast use in 1962 using the arms and turntables of the day. Production has continued uninterrupted since then. There are available different versions upgraded by other companies or individuals involved in DIY audio.

== Technical specification ==
=== Diamond: ===
- Stylus shape: conical (nude)
- Stylus tip radius: 16.5 microns (0.65 mil)
- Stylus tip: 0.2mm square solid diamond
- Cantilever: conical double construction with different light alloy
- Frequency Response: 20 ~ 45 kHz
- Output: 0.3 mV at 50 mm/s
- Output Impedance: 40 Ω
- Load Impedance: 100 Ω
- Channel Separation: Over 25 dB at 1 kHz
- Compliance: 5 x 10–6 cm/dyne (100 Hz)
- Tracking Force: 2.5g (± 0.3g)
- Weight: 8.5 grams

Despite being designed in the 1960s it is still one of the masterpieces in audio technology and can easily compete with contemporary constructions. Due to its construction, Denon DL-103 is recommended as one of the very few cartridges suitable for heavy tonearms. (like in Lenco or Garrard turntables) As a low-output phono cartridge it requires either a step up transformer for a standard MM phono preamp, or phono preamp with built-in MC input.
