= A Starting Point =

Political website in United States

A Starting Point is a website, launched in 2020, devoted to presenting videos by elected officials (current or former), presenting various points of view on issues that are of interest to the United States electorate. It was started by Chris Evans, Mark Kassen, and Joe Kiani. Since starting this project in 2017, Evans et al have been able to engage dozens of elected officials to create videos on a plethora of topics; the draw for the speakers is that, unlike when being interviewed by a journalist, they can speak their minds without being attacked for their points of view. The basic idea is to encourage civic engagement of the electorate by allowing politicians in office to present their points of view in a civil manner, and start dialogs which will encourage bipartisanship.

The website has these sections:

- Starting Points, videos under 2 minutes, organized by broad topic
- Daily Points, in which an office-holder can discuss any topics for under 2 minutes
- Counterpoints, in which two office-holders (typically one Democrat and one Republican) can discuss a topic of their choosing, in multiple videos of under two minutes, alternating between the two speakers

The participants include:

- Senators
- Members of Congress
- Governors
- Mayors
- State representatives

If a user chooses to see all contributions by a particular politician, the sections available includes Intro Points, which gives the politician the opportunity to introduce themselves to the viewer by answering three questions:

- What inspired you to get into politics?
- What is your most meaningful moment in politics?
- What do you think can be done to create a more bipartisan environment in Washington?
