= DEI Holdings =

American electronics company

Sound United, LLC
- Type: Subsidiary
- Founded: 2005; 21 years ago, in Vista, California, U.S.
- Founders: Darrell and Kathy Issa
- Headquarters: One Viper Way, Suite C Vista, California, US
- Key people: Kevin Duffy (CEO)
- Products: Consumer audio/video, Speakers, Vehicle security/remote access
- Parent: Harman International
- Website: www.soundunited.com

Sound United, LLC is an American consumer audio electronics company. It owns brands including Denon, Polk Audio, Marantz and Bowers & Wilkins. In 2025, Sound United was acquired by Harman International, a subsidiary of Samsung Electronics.

== History ==
The company that became Sound United was founded by future US Representative Darrell Issa and his wife Kathy in 1982 as Directed Electronics, with Darrell Issa serving as the first CEO. In 2000, Darrell Issa was elected to the House of Representatives, and Jim Minarik replaced him as CEO.

In 2004, the firm bought speaker company Definitive Technology; in 2006, it bought Polk Audio.

In 2008, the companies adapted a holding company strategy, and their parent became DEI Holdings, Inc.

In 2011, the company was bought by private equity firm Charlesbank Capital Partners.

In April 2013, the company combined Polk, Definitive Technology and the Boom Movement brands into a new division called Sound United.

In August 2016, Kevin Duffy was named the company's CEO, replacing retiring CEO Jim Minarik.

In March 2017, Sound United acquired YS consumer electronics company D+M Group, whose brands included Denon, HEOS by Denon, Marantz and Boston Acoustics. At the time, D+M was the world's largest supplier of audio/video receivers.

In October 2020, Sound United acquired Bowers & Wilkins.

In March 2021, Sound United acquired Australia's leading importer and distributor of home entertainment systems QualiFi Pty Ltd. QualiFi Pty Ltd was the Australian importer and distributor for Blustream, Denon, Elan, Forte, Furman, HEOS, Jamo, Klipsch, Marantz, Niles, Stealth Acoustics, Sunfire, Thorens and Xantech brands of high-quality Home Entertainment components and systems. QualiFi was based in Mount Waverley, Victoria and incorporates a service department for the servicing and repair of all products distributed by them.

In April 2022, Sound United was acquired by Masimo.

In September 2025, Harman acquired the company from Masimo for $350 million.

== Brands ==
- Denon
- Marantz
- Bowers & Wilkins
- Definitive Technology
- Polk Audio
- Boston Acoustics
- HEOS
- Classé
