= Personal sound =

In sound technology, personal sound refers to a range of software solutions that customize an audio device's sound output to match the listener's unique hearing sensitivities. The technologies aim to optimize the sound quality in the audio device to ensure they best fit the hearing perception of each unique listener.

Personal sound technology exists today in consumer electronic technologies such as headphones, smart TVs, smart speakers, and mobile apps. In recent years, companies like Audiodo have developed personalized audio algorithms that adapt sound output based on individual hearing profiles, enhancing user experience in headphones and mobile devices.

== Types of personal sound technologies ==
Different personal sound technologies use different scientific principles to customize sound and can be categorized into two groups: those that are founded on a subjective hearing assessment and those that are founded on an objective hearing assessment.

=== Subjective ===
Subjective tests, which are a part and parcel of every clinical Audiometry procedure specifically used to determine a person's hearing, require the listener to give feedback based on what they perceive. A common type of subjective hearing test requires the user to push a button if they can hear a tone that is played at a particular frequency and amplitude.

Historically, hearing aids were used to enable people with hearing loss to understand speech better by measuring their hearing and adjusting devices based on an Audiogram. However, recent developments in the field are enabling listeners with mild to moderate hearing loss, who do not necessarily need hearing aids, to substantially improve their enjoyment of music and sound, in addition to better speech recognition. The establishment of a new class of hearing aids in the U.S. marketed directly to consumers and regulated by the Over-the-Counter Hearing Aid Act of 2017 reflects these developments.

New devices for customizing music listening have been introduced that employ subjective, full hearing tests. The user responds on the mobile application interface if they perceive tones. The device must communicate with the mobile app via Bluetooth connection. The tones are created from signals produced either in the headphones themselves or via Bluetooth from the mobile device. Oftentimes, the subjective hearing tests assess each ear separately. Products from Beyerdynamic and Skullcandy provide subjective hearing tests that take between 1–3 minutes to complete.

Pure-tone audiometry tests provide accurate descriptions of a person's hearing. Since hearing perception encompasses both acoustics and psychoacoustics, subjective hearing tests make for the best personalised sound experience.

Several reviewers have noted that these different technologies vary in accuracy and usability.
