= Saul Marantz =

American musician and engineer

Saul Bernard Marantz (July 11, 1911 – January 17, 1997) was an American musician, inventor, and engineer who founded audio manufacturer Marantz in 1948.

Marantz was a fellow of the Audio Engineering Society. He is considered a pioneer in developing hi-fi audio technology.

== Career ==
In the early 1950s, he founded an audio manufacturer Marantz with one product, Model One. The company was acquired by Superscope Inc. in 1964. He served as the president of Marantz from its founding until 1968.
