= SOSV =

Venture capital firm

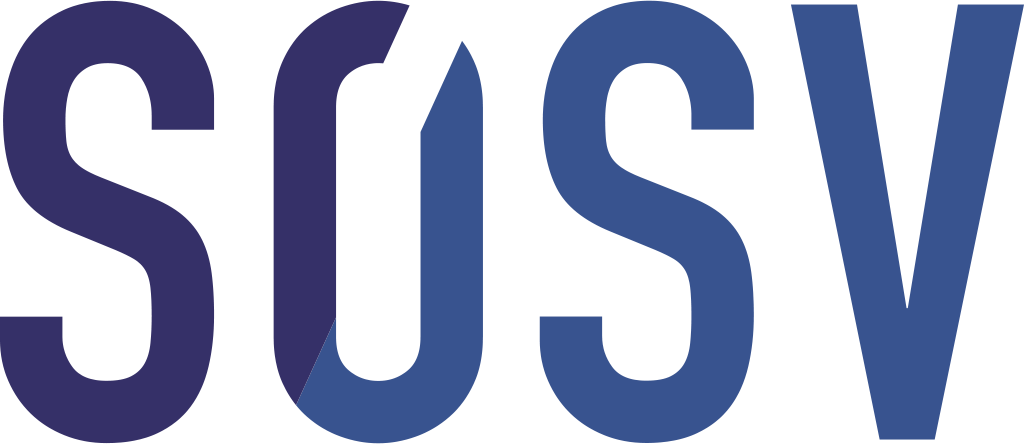
- Type: Private company
- Industry: Venture capital and private equity
- Founded: 1995
- Founder: Sean O'Sullivan
- Headquarters: Princeton, New Jersey, United States
- Number of locations: Cork, New York City, Newark, Pune, Princeton, San Francisco, Shenzhen, Tokyo
- Services: Venture funding
- Number of employees: 100+ (2023)
- Website: www.sosv.com

SOSV is an American venture capital firm that provides pre-seed, seed, Series A and later stage funding to deep tech startups that join its startup development programs, which are located in New York City, Newark, New Jersey, and San Francisco.

SOSV was founded in 1995 by Sean O'Sullivan. It is headquartered in Princeton, New Jersey, with additional offices in Cork, Pune, Shenzhen and Tokyo.

== History ==
In July 2018, then governor of New York state Andrew Cuomo announced that the state would invest $25 million in an IndieBio facility in New York City. In January 2023, SOSV opened a 30,000 sq. ft. IndieBio NY at 7 Penn Plaza in Manhattan.

In December 2020, TechCrunch's former COO, Ned Desmond joined SOSV as senior operating partner.

As of November 2021, SOSV has backed approximately 150 startups that are developing climate technologies, with a focus on the transport, supply chain, logistics, and agriculture sectors.

In September 2021, the New Jersey Economic Development Authority announced that the state was investing $25 million to establish a HAX location in Newark, New Jersey.

The new 35,000 sq ft HAX office in Newark, New Jersey opened officially in April 2024.

== Investments ==
SOSV invests in startups that specialize in deep tech, including climate and health. Notable companies within its portfolio include Opentrons, Formlabs, NotCo, Prolific Machines, unSpun, Neptune Robotics, Smartex, and BitMEX.

In 2020, SOSV closed its fourth fund totalling $277 million.

In 2021, SOSV closed a $100 million Select Fund.

In 2024, SOSV closed its fifth core fund, totalling $306 million.

== Programmes ==
SOSV runs the following programmes:

- HAX, a development program headquartered in Newark, NJ for startups focused on hard tech in categories including Industrial decarbonization, automation, robotics, and human health.
- IndieBio, a startup development program centered on life sciences and addressing human and planetary health, with offices in New York City and San Francisco.
