= Sean O'Sullivan (engineer) =

American entrepreneur, inventor and investor

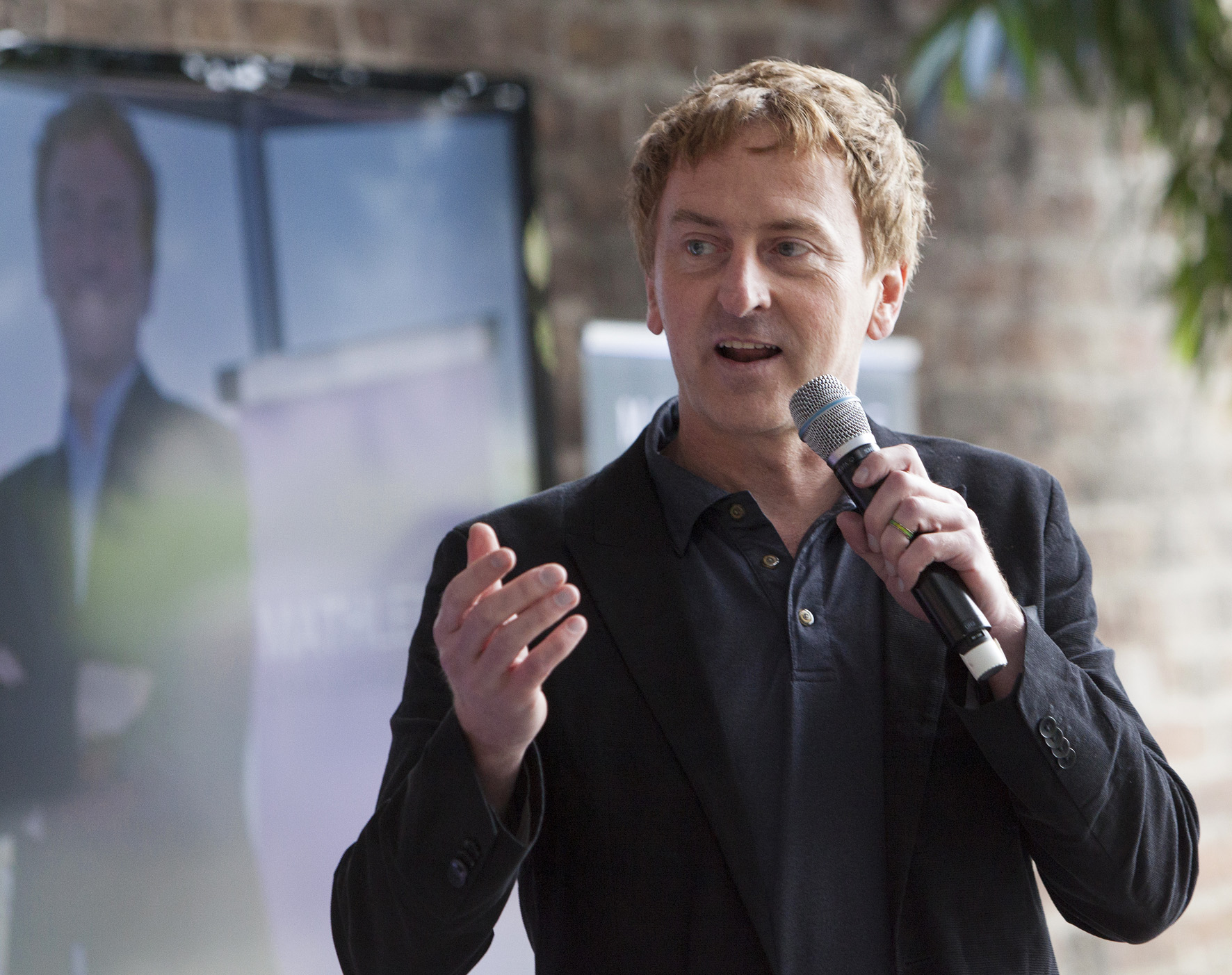
Sean O'Sullivan of SOSV

Sean O’Sullivan is an entrepreneur, founder, and investor, based in Princeton, New Jersey. He is currently the founder and managing partner of SOSV, a venture capital firm focused on deep tech startups in health and climate tech startups.

== Education ==
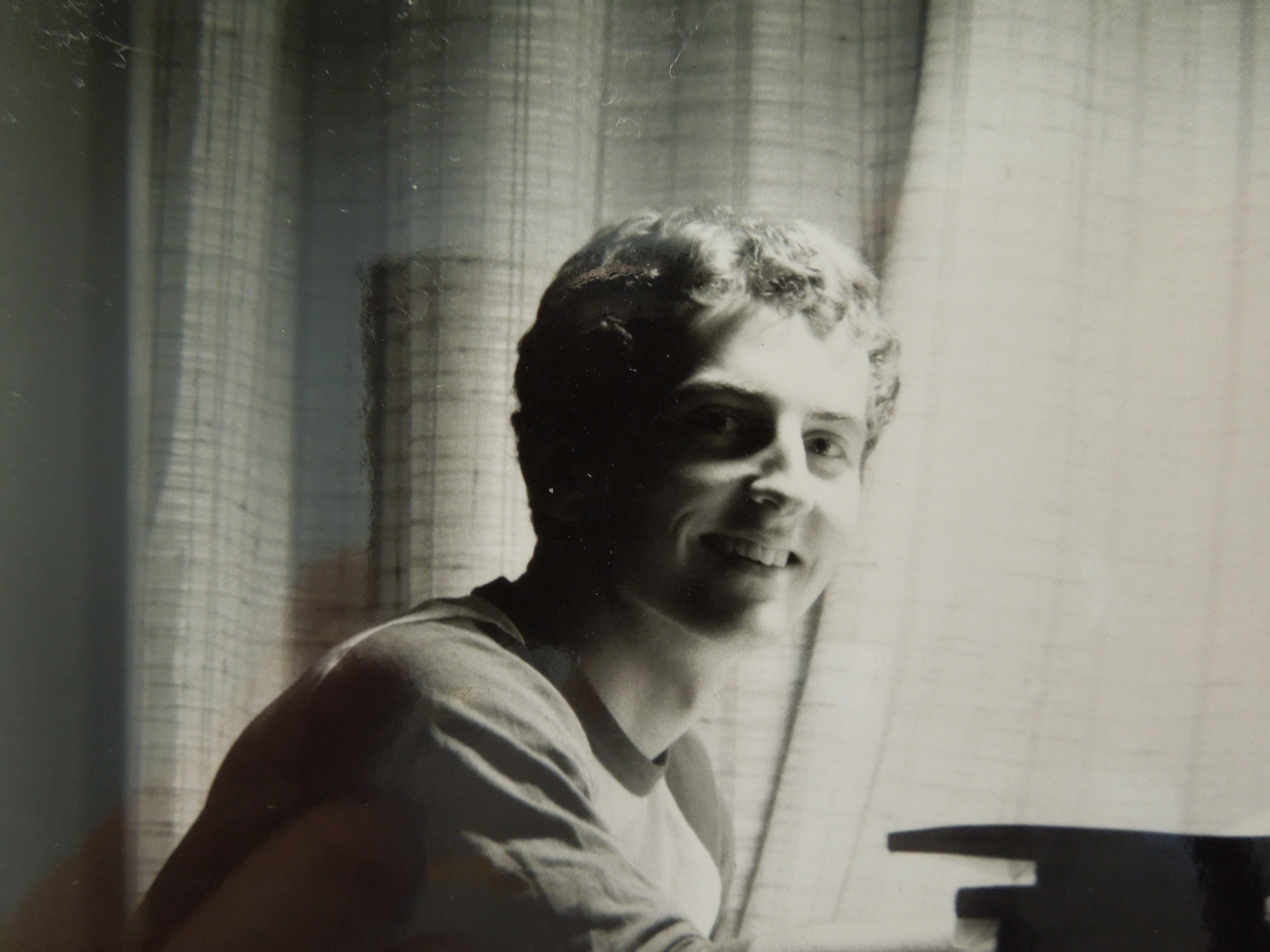
Sean O'Sullivan in his dorm at Rensselaer Polytechnic Institute in the early 1980s

O'Sullivan graduated from high school at 16. O'Sullivan holds a Bachelor of Science in electrical engineering from Rensselaer Polytechnic Institute and a Master of Fine Arts in Film Production from the University of Southern California.

== Career ==
In 1986, O’Sullivan co-founded MapInfo, which was an early provider of digital street maps for personal computers and went public in 1994.

In 1996, O’Sullivan and George Favaloro coined the term "Cloud Computing".

In 2007, he founded Avego, which released a ridesharing app on the iPhone in 2008, matching riders to drivers in real-time. The company, now known as Carma Technology, develops patented systems for real-time ridesharing as well as app-based tolling. In 2025, Carma filed a complaint against Uber in the U.S. District Court for the Eastern District of Texas, claiming that Uber infringed on five Carma patents, each listing Sean O'Sullivan as the inventor, that describe the fundamentals of ride-sharing and delivery apps.

In 2011, Sean O’Sullivan spent two seasons as an investor on the Irish TV show Dragon's Den.
