= Denon =

Japanese electronics company

Denon 株式会社デノン
- Type: Subsidiary
- Industry: Electronics
- Founded: 1910; 116 years ago, in Japan (as Nippon DENki ONkyo Kabushikigaisha)
- Founder: Frederick Whitney Horn
- Products: Audio; Visual
- Owner: Samsung Electronics
- Parent: Sound United LLC
- Website: www.denon.com

Denon (株式会社デノン, Kabushiki Gaisha Denon) (/ˈdɛnɒn/ DEN-on) is a Japanese electronics company of audio equipment. The Denon brand came from a merger of Denki Onkyo (not to be confused with the other Onkyo) and others in 1939. It originally started as Nippon Chikuonki Shoukai in 1910 by Frederick Whitney Horn, an American entrepreneur.

Denon produced the first cylinder audio media in Japan and players to play them. Decades later, Denon was involved in the early stages of development of digital audio technology, while specializing in the manufacture of high-fidelity professional and consumer audio equipment. Denon made Japan's first professional disc recorder and used it to record the Hirohito surrender broadcast. For many decades, Denon was a brand name of Nippon-Columbia, including the Nippon Columbia record label. In 2001, Denon was spun off as a separate company with 98% held by Ripplewood Holdings and 2% by Hitachi. In 2002, Denon merged with Marantz to form D&M Holdings. On March 1, 2017, Sound United LLC completed the acquisition of D+M Holdings. On September 23, 2025, Sound United was acquired by Harman International which is a Samsung-owned company.

== History ==
The company was initially named Nippon Denki Onkyō Kabushikigaisha (日本電氣音響株式會社, Japan Electric Sound Company), which was shortened to Denon. The company is actively involved with sound systems and electric appliance production. Later the company merged with other related companies and as a result of this the company name became Denon.

There followed a number of mergers and tie-ins over the next few decades as firstly the company merged with Japan-US Recorders Manufacturing in 1912, and then in 1928 the brand "Columbia" was introduced when the company became Japan Columbia Recorders. A further change of name occurred in 1946 when the company renamed itself Nippon Columbia.

The Denon brand was first established in 1947 when Nippon Columbia merged with Japan Denki Onkyo. D&M Holdings Inc. was created in May 2002 when Denon Ltd and Marantz Japan Inc. merged. On March 1, 2017, Sound United LLC completed the acquisition of D+M Holdings.

Today, the company specializes in professional and consumer home cinema and audio equipment including A/V receivers, Blu-ray players, tuners, headphones, and wireless music systems. Denon is also known for high-end AV receivers and moving coil phonograph cartridges. Two M-series models, the Denon M31 and M30, were the most successful radio hi-fi's in the mid-2000s. Since being released to the micro hi-fi DAB market, they have received several awards in Europe.

== Product timeline ==
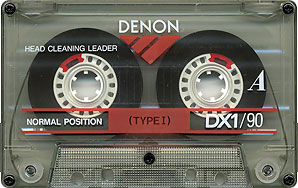
Denon DX1/90 audio cassette tape, 1992

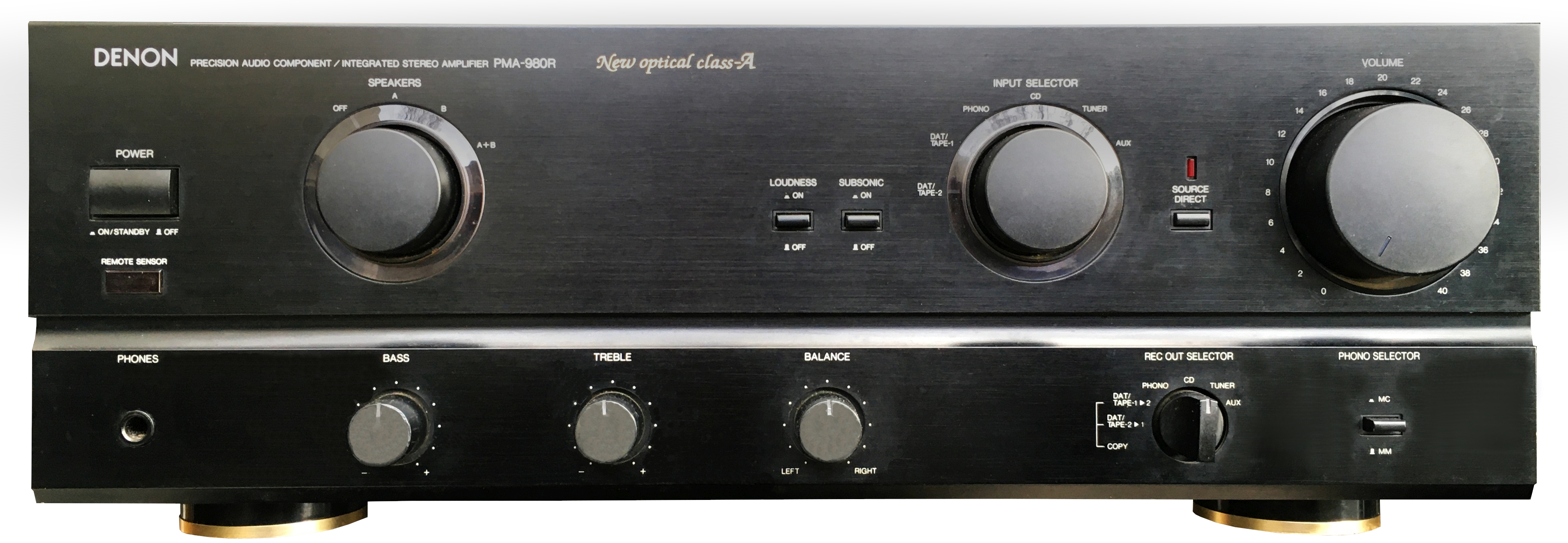
Stereo audio amplifier Denon PMA-980R, 1992

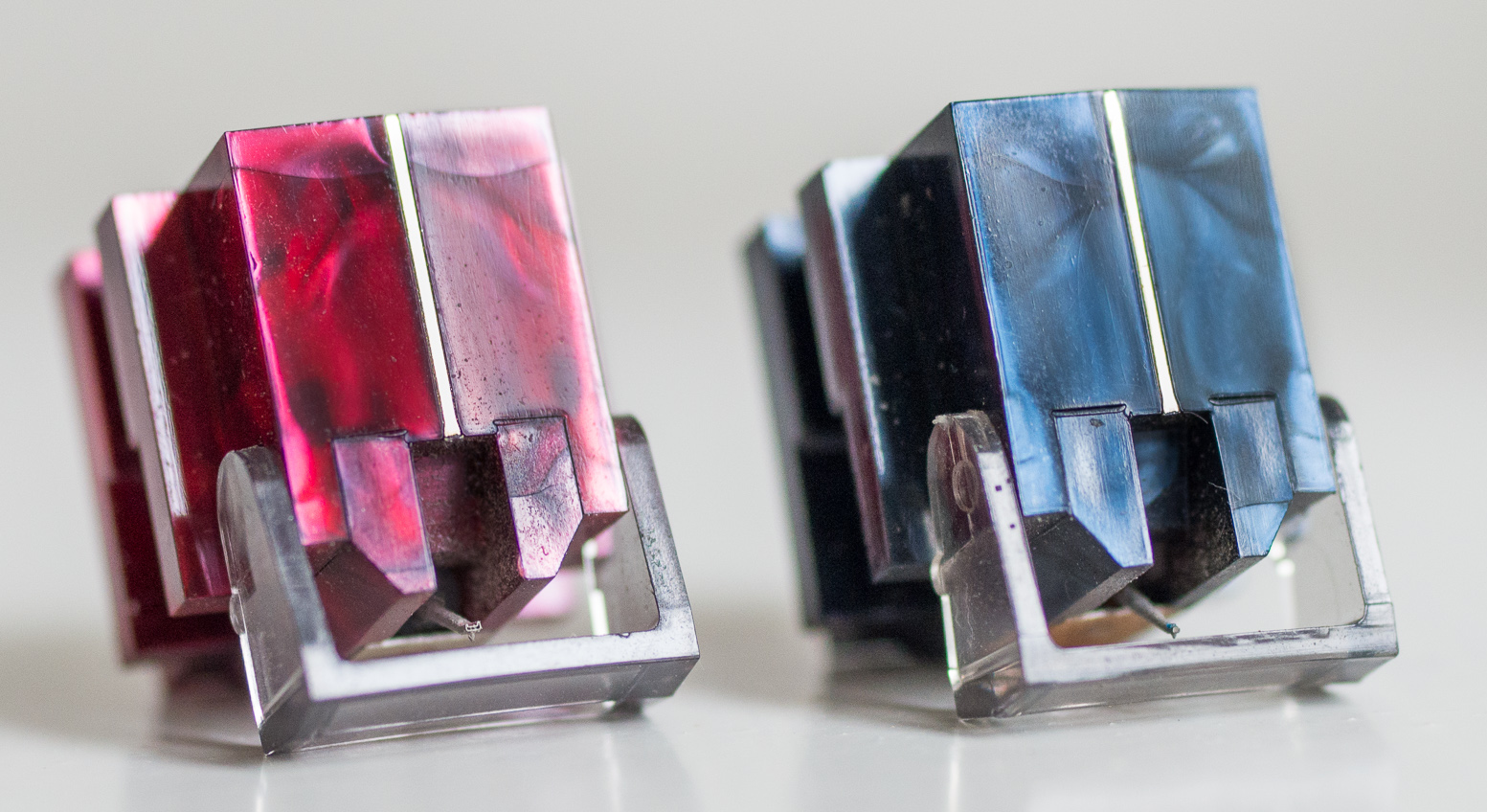
Denon DL-110&160, High output MC-pickups (since 1984)

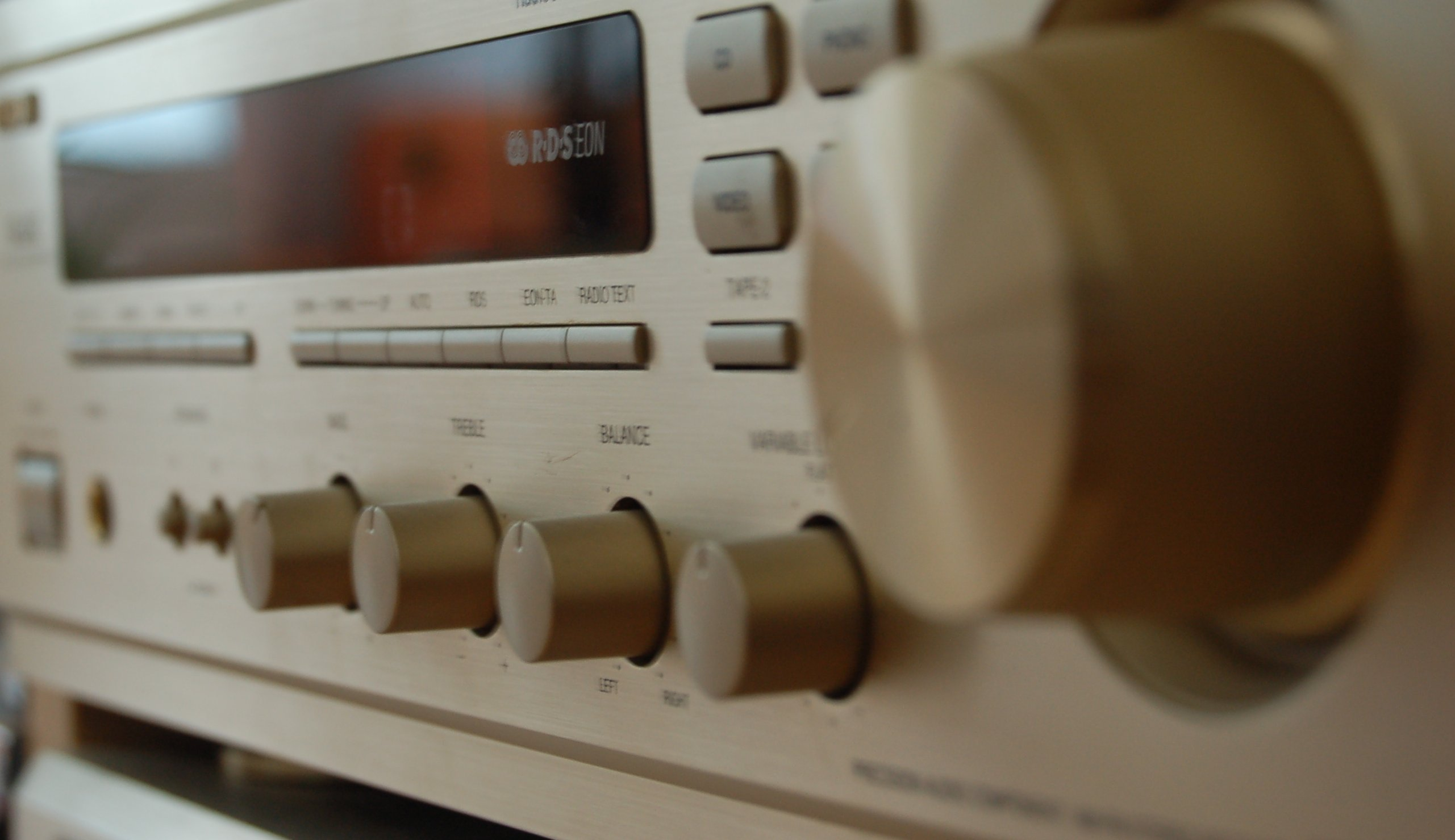
Denon RDS receiver DRA-1000 (1999-2001)

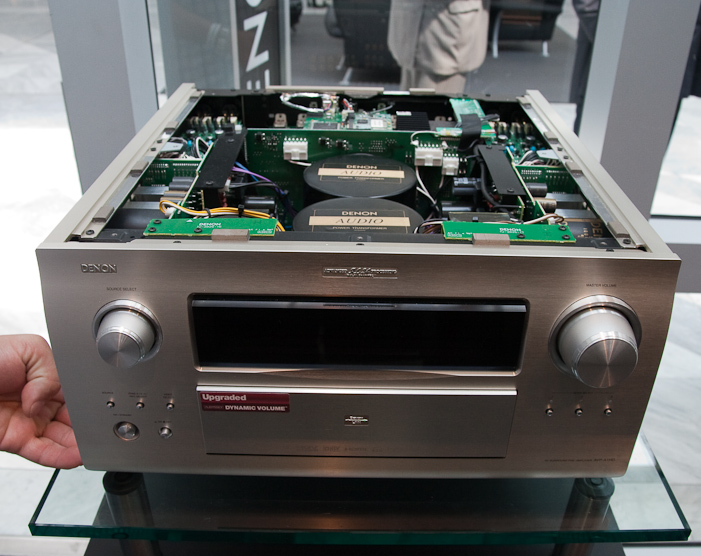
Denon AV (High End Munich, 2009)

- 1910: Manufacturer of single-sided disc records and gramophones.
- 1939: Launched first professional-use disc recorder for broadcast industry and disk cutting lathe.
- 1951: Commenced sales of Japan's 1st LP records.
- 1953: Launched professional-use tape recorder for broadcast industry.
- 1958: Introduced sales of stereo records.
- 1959: Commenced production of open-reel audio tapes.
- 1962: Introduced Elepian series of electronic pianos.
- 1963: Developed the DL-103 phono cartridge.
- 1964: Started sales of audio cassette tapes.
- 1971: Started producing hi-fi audio components, including turntables, amplifiers, tuners and speakers.
- 1972: Introduced the world's first viable 8 channel digital recorder.
- 1977: Awarded US Billboard magazine's "Trend-Setter Award for outstanding contribution to the industry".
- 1980: Awarded the 13th Montreux International Diplome d’honneur technique award.
- 1981: Developed a professional-use CD player.
- 1984: Unveiled the CD-ROM format.
- 1988: Introduced range of AV amplifiers to product range.
- 1990: Awarded three component awards at Paris hi-fi show. Introduced lineup of Headphones.
- 1993: Developed the twin deck DJ CD player DN-2000F. Other early models are the DN1000F, DN2000F and the DN2500F. Denon also made the world's only twin MiniDisc player designed for DJ use.
- 1994: Awarded European Audio Innovation of the Year.
- 1999: World's first THX-EX home theater system (THX Extended to provide fuller surround sound).
- 2001: Produced first Mini system with 5.1 surround sound.
- 2002: Denon link technology developed for improved digital connectivity.
- 2004: Launch of world's first consumer product featuring HQV (Hollywood Quality Video).
- 2006: Denon introduces the 1.5m long AK-DL1 CAT5 Ethernet cable. It was not until mid-2008 that it caused controversy because of its high price ($499) and the company's claims that the cable is "designed for the audio enthusiast," and would "bring out all the nuances" in digital audio signals transmitted over it, despite the fact that even the most poorly made Ethernet cable would deliver identical quality for digital audio over a similar length.
- 2007: Denon releases the AVP-A1HDCI Pre-Amplifier and matching POA-A1HDCI Power Amplifier set which marks the company's first additions to a new line of high-performance custom-focused components.
- 2008: Denon announces the world's first Universal Blu-ray player capable of DVD-Audio and SA-CD playback.
- 2012: Denon introduces new headphone line with iOS lifestyle apps. Headphones are separated into different lifestyle groups as follows: Exercise Freak headphones (for sports/fitness use), Globe Cruiser headphones (for travel), Music Maniac Headphones (featuring a Flat EQ) and Urban Raver Headphones (providing enhanced bass performance).
- 2014: Denon has ventured into wireless multi-room sound systems. Recently it has launched its new set of wireless speakers named as HEOS by Denon. These have been launched as HEOS 3, HEOS 5, and HEOS 7 speakers.
- 2015: HEOS by Denon added on to their wireless multi-room sound system by launching the HEOS 1 and HEOS Go Pack, along with the HEOS HomeCinema
- 2016: Denon introduced HEOS into the Higher X-Series Models. For HEOS by Denon series 2 for all the speakers have launched now they feature Bluetooth and High Resolution Audio.
- 2017: Denon introduced HEOS into the S-Series (AVR-S730H/AVR-S930H) and all the X-Series Models now have HEOS. HEOS by Denon launched the HEOS Soundbar, HEOS Subwoofer and the HEOS AVR.
- 2018: Denon introduced the world's first 13.2 channel audio/video receiver with the introduction of the AVR-X8500H / AVC-X8500H at the Consumer Electronics Show (CES) in Las Vegas, Nevada.
- 2020: Denon introduced the first 8K HDMI 2.1 compliant channel audio/video receivers with their AVR-X line starting from AVR-x2700h, AVR-x3700h, AVR-x4700h, and AVR-x6700h. Denon has also announced that they will allow hardware upgrades for AVR-x8500h for 8K features.
- 2023: Denon acquires Nura.

== See also ==
- List of phonograph manufacturers
