= Bowers & Wilkins =

British company specializing in audio equipment

- Type: Subsidiary
- Industry: Consumer electronics
- Founded: 1966; 60 years ago
- Founder: John Bowers & Roy Wilkins
- Headquarters: Worthing, West Sussex
- Key people: Blair Tripodi
- Products: Hi-Fi and Home theatre Loudspeakers; Wireless Speakers; Headphones
- Parent: Harman International Industries
- Website: bowerswilkins.com

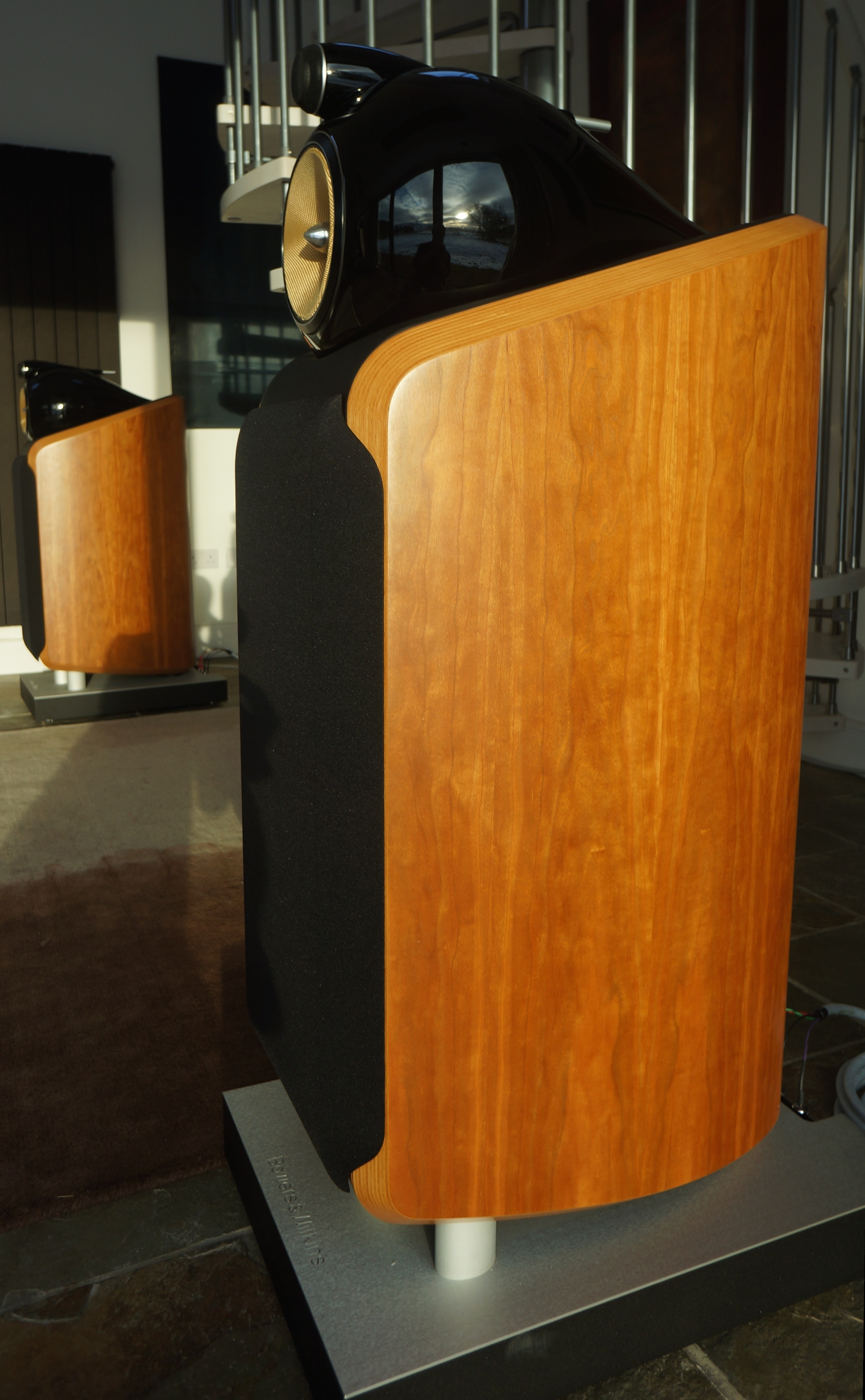
B&W 800 Diamond with tweeter and mid-chassis in Nautilus-design

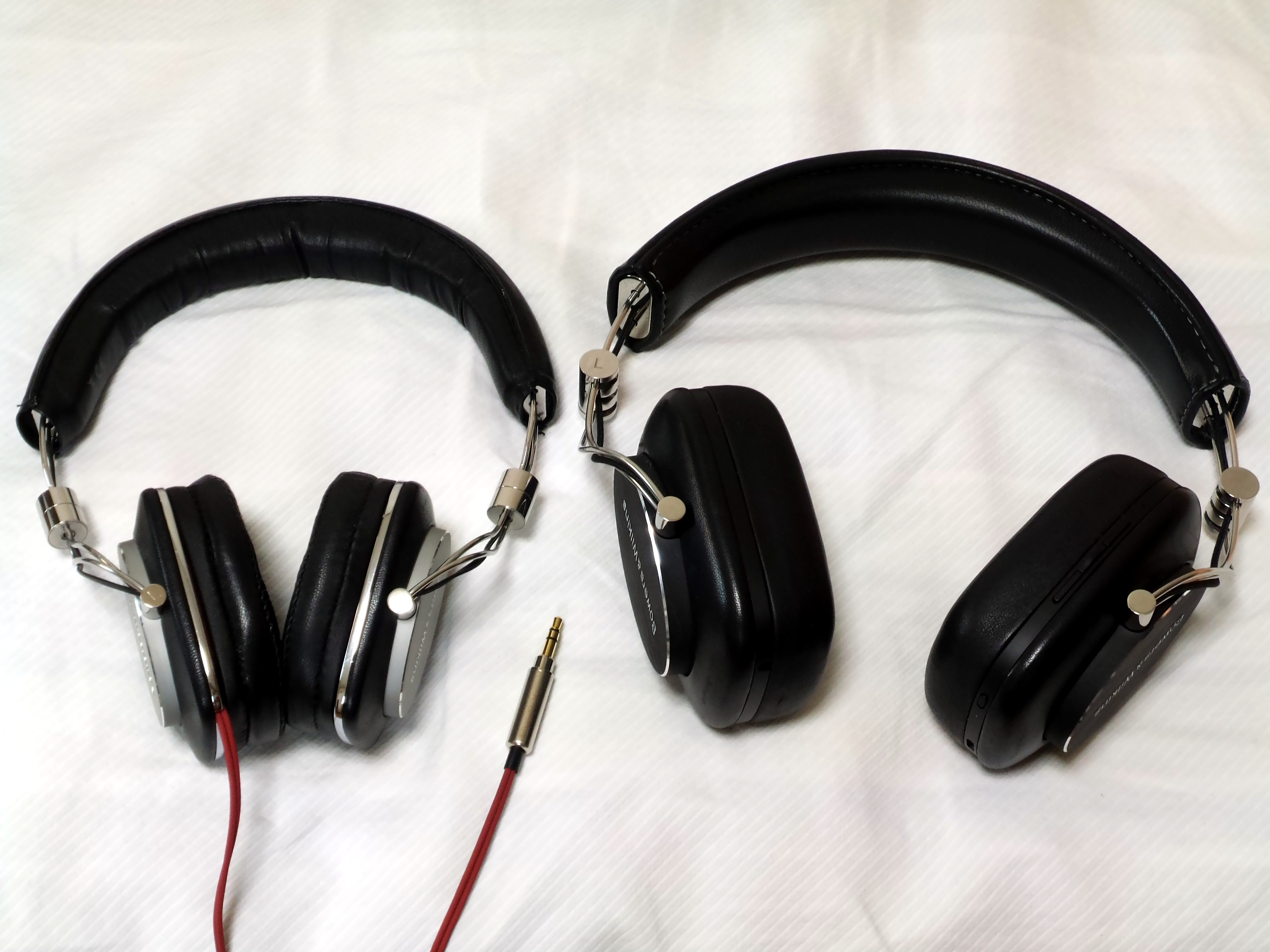
B&W headphones P5 (red cable customised) and P7 (wireless)

Bowers & Wilkins, commonly known as B&W, is a British company that produces consumer and professional loudspeakers and headphones. The company was founded in 1966 in Worthing, West Sussex, England.

In October 2020, it was acquired by Sound United, a holding company who owns several other audio brands. The Sound United portfolio was subsequently acquired by Harman International, a subsidiary of Samsung Electronics, in 2025.

== History ==
=== Early years ===
Bowers & Wilkins began as a radio and electronics shop in Worthing. It was started after World War II by John Bowers and Roy Wilkins, who had met while serving in the Royal Corps of Signals during the war and learned of their shared interest in radio. The shop expanded to include television retail, a rentals business, and a service department run by Peter Hayward, a childood friend of Bowers. When the shop began supplying public address equipment to schools and churches in Sussex, Bowers became increasingly involved in the design and assembly of loudspeakers, eventually setting up a small production line in workshops behind the shop.

=== 1960s ===
In 1966, Bowers founded a separate company, B&W Loudspeakers Ltd., marking a shift away from his involvement with the original shop. The first production line for B&W Loudspeakers was set up in workshops located in the shop's backyard. The shop still operates today, with remnants of the original production line visible as a nod to its history.

The 1967 P1 was the first commercial speaker from B&W. The cabinet and filter were B&W's own, but the drivers came from EMI and Celestion. The profits of the P1 allowed Bowers to purchase a Radiometer Oscillator and Pen Recorder, allowing for calibration certificates for every speaker sold.

In 1968, Audioscript in the Netherlands became the first international distributor appointed. The DM1 (Domestic Monitor) and DM3 were introduced that year. Dennis Ward (a former technical manager at EMI) became a member of the board in 1969.

The shop is now owned and managed by Roy's son, Paul Wilkins, who had worked at B&W Loudspeakers since 1969 when his father retired. Paul runs the business along with Chris Hugill, who previously ran B&W Loudspeakers UK Ltd., the company's United Kingdom distribution arm. They also oversaw the distribution of the Aura range of electronics and Nakamichi compact cassette decks in the UK.

=== 1970s ===
In 1970, the ionovac-tweeter equipped P2 speakers were produced. They were also licensed by Sony and rebadged in Worthing to be distributed in Japan. The company decided to develop a loudspeaker wholly built in-house. The sizeable DM70 from 1970 combined electrostatic mid- and high range on top of a traditional bass unit. In 1972, a new production facility was opened in Meadow Road, Worthing. Housing anechoic chambers and Bruel & Kjaer measurement equipment, the research team investigated phase linearity and speaker cone construction using laser interferometry. 1972 also saw the introduction of the DM2, a three-unit system, consisting of an 8-inch bass/mid-range speaker rear loaded with an acoustic line, a Celestion HF1300 tweeter, and a super tweeter.

B&W was recognized with the Queen's Award for Export in 1973 and developed program content monitors for the BBC. In 1974, Kenneth Grange of Pentagram joined as an industrial designer. The 1976, DM6 loudspeaker incorporated Kevlar cones and introduced updates to filter and enclosure design.

In 1977, the DM7 loudspeaker featured a tweeter positioned separately from the main cabinet and included a passive radiator. Exports grew significantly between 1973 and 1978, (by 1973, exports accounted for 60% of all Bowers & Wilkins production) leading to a second Queen's Award for Export. The 801 loudspeaker, introduced in 1979 after three years of development, highlighted advancements in audio engineering.

=== 1980s ===
In 1982, the company opened its Steyning research facility and added a PDP11/35 computer, utilizing a building previously owned by SME Ltd. Research into amplifiers and active filters leads to the Active One loudspeaker, branded under the name of John Bowers Active One in 1984.

In the 1980s, Laurence Dickie was hired as an amplifier designer. In a 2025 interview, Dickie said, "I was given the job because I’d been working on active crossovers for fun, as a hobby." Dickie had developed the idea of a 'matrix' construction, after initial inspiration of Aerolam being used by Celestion. His reasoning was to extend the structure of Aerolam to fill the entire cabinet. At the time, B&W wanted to develop active crossovers and active B&W loudspeakers. Dickie presented his ideas to John Bowers, it was tested by the research team, and found to have significant qualities in reducing loudspeaker cabinet colouration. A new range with this 'Matrix' culminated into the first 'Matrix 1,2 and 3' loudspeakers.

In 1986, B&W's 20th anniversary was celebrated with a Festival Hall concert and classical CD. That same year, the Matrix Series featuring a honeycomb cabinet structure was introduced.

Also in 1986, John Dibb joined the company, later to become responsible for many speaker designs, notably several signature models. Dibb's 1987 'Concept 90' CM1 loudspeaker was the first B&W speaker with a plastic moulded matrix cabinet.

The 800 loudspeaker range was improved into matrix versions with its very rigid cabinet construction in 1987.

In 1987, Bowers died. Robert Trunz, who had been an investor in the company after first buying B&W’s North American distributor, took leadership of the company and asked Dickie to independently complete the work of John Bowers, who was researching a way of producing a speaker with zero cabinet effect. This ultimately became the 'Nautilus' Loudspeaker premiered in its prototype form in 1991.

In 1988, Abbey Road Studios upgraded to the B&W Matrix 801 into its studios. Abbey Road’s engineers are frequent visitors to the Steyning Research Establishment.

In 1989, B&W appointed Morten Warren, and manufactures his Emphasis ‘graduate project’ loudspeaker design. He is responsible for some current B&W product designs, including the Zeppelin and P5 headphones.

=== 1990s ===
In 1991, the Silver Signature loudspeaker was launched to commemorate the company's 25th anniversary, (silver replaced copper, as it was a better electrical conductor) as well as the introduction to 'Project Nautilus'. Increasing demand led to by opening an additional production site at Silverdale, Worthing, West Sussex in 1992. In 1993, after five years of research, the 'Nautilus' Loudspeaker was officially launched. It still remains the company's flagship product. In 1996, Robert Trunz completed the sale of his shares and Joe Atkins took control of Bowers and Wilkins. In 1998, Laurence Dickie left the company while some of his Nautilus technology was introduced in the somewhat more affordable Nautilus 800 series.

=== 2000s ===
In 2002, Bowers & Wilkins moved its Worthing production, warehousing, and head office to a new £7 million location on a former landfill site in Dale Road, Worthing. A second plant was built in Bradford.

B&W took over its production factory for cabinets in Agerbæk, Denmark in 2003. In the same year, the Bradford location was left for new premises in Cleckheaton, West Yorkshire.

In 2005, B&W replaced its top-of-the-line N800 range with the new 800D range. The most publicized change was the introduction of diamond dome tweeters on some models. 2005 also saw B&W receive the Queen's Award for Innovation for the tube-loaded drivers on the 800s. B&W's 803D and PV1 received the EISA Award for European High End Audio Component of the Year and European Home Theatre Subwoofer of the year 2005-2006 respectively. The XT series introduced aluminium as a speaker cabinet material.

In 2006, the CM Series was launched. That same year, the series was recognized when the bookshelf model CM1 won the EISA Speaker of the Year 2006 Award. In November 2006, B&W produced a limited edition of the DM601 for Norman Cook (aka Fatboy Slim) to celebrate the launch of his 'Greatest Hits' album.

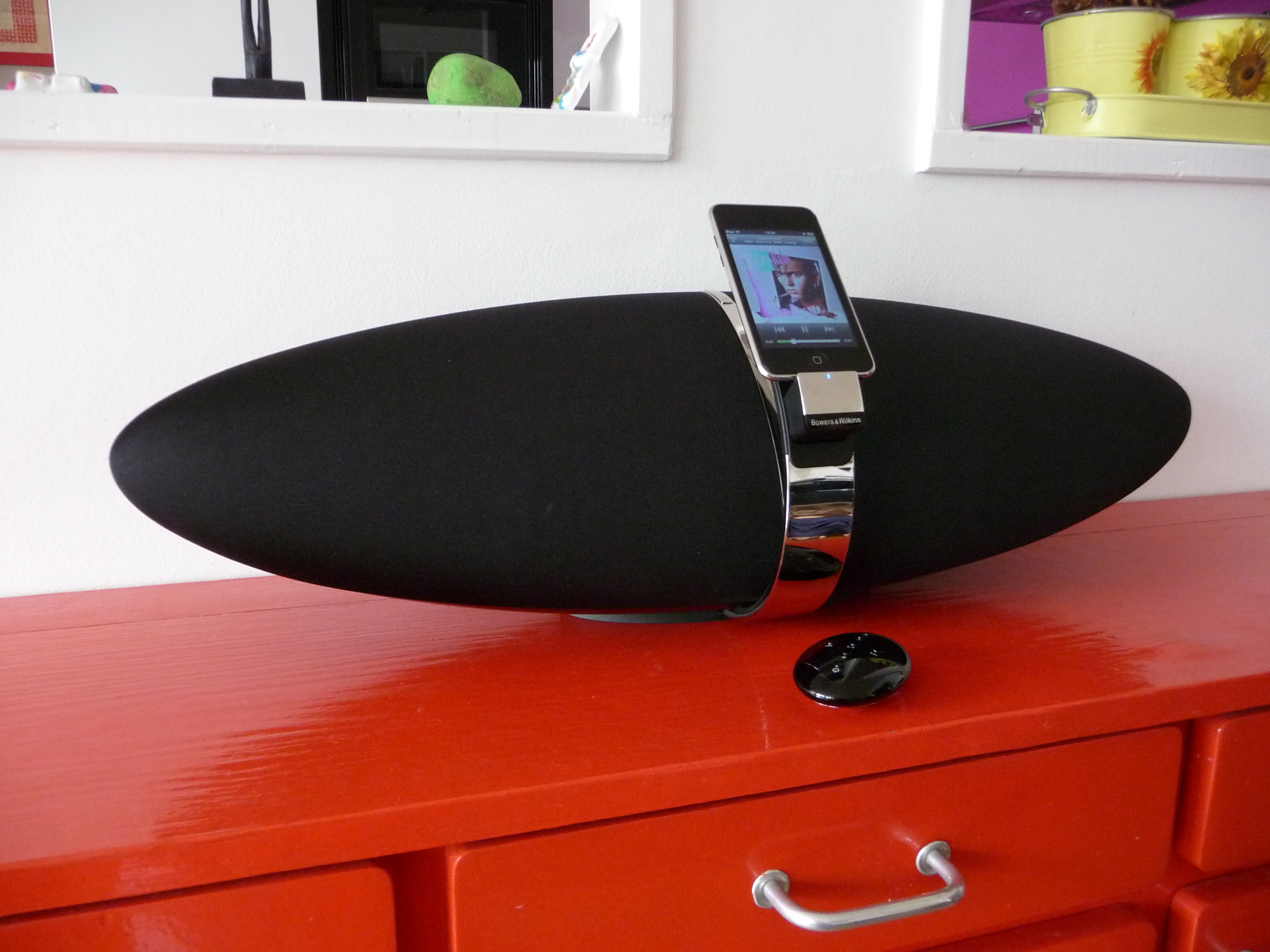
B&W Zeppelin, since 2007

In 2007, the 'Zeppelin' iPod speaker system was introduced. That same year, Bowers & Wilkins' released the project the Society of Sound, an online community focused on issues and discussions relating to high-quality sound. The Society of Sound has many celebrity "Fellows", who contribute material. Fellows include Peter Gabriel, film composer James Howard, musician Dave Stewart, jazz singer Cassandra Wilson, and industrial designer Kenneth Grange.

From 2008 to 2012, the "Jaguar XF Audio System" by B&W was available: a car audio setup with 14 speakers and a powered 440 Watt Class AB DSP amplifier.

In May 2008, B&W started the Bowers & Wilkins Music Club, now known as the Society of Sound, returning the company into the music business. The Society of Sound is a subscription-based music retail site. Albums are currently available in either Apple Lossless or Flac format. The site is a partnership with Peter Gabriel's Real World Studios, and artists to be featured have been Little Axe, Cara Dillon, Gwyneth Herbert, and Portico Quartet. Former Suede frontman Brett Anderson had his solo album Wilderness released through the Society of Sound before being available for retail.

=== 2010s ===
In May 2016, Bowers & Wilkins was bought by Eva Automation, a company founded two years prior by Gideon Yu.

In October 2017, B&W formalized their 30-year old relationship by becoming the official headphones and loudspeaker partner of Abbey Road Studios.

=== 2020s ===
In October 2020, Sound United LLC acquired Bowers & Wilkins. In early 2022, Sound United was acquired by US-American Masimo.

In May 2025, Masimo announced that it would sell its consumer audio division to Harman International, a division of Samsung Electronics, for $350 million. Harman already owns several high-end audiophile brands such as JBL, Mark Levinson, Lexicon and Revel Audio in addition to namesake Harman Kardon.

In August 2025 B&W celebrated the 50-year relationship with Abbey Road Studios by releasing a special-edition 801 Abbey Road Limited Edition. Limited to 140 pairs and priced at $70,000 / £55,000 a pair, they feature touches like walnut finish to match the piano in the famous Studio Three and red leather speaker tops to match the control room console.

== Technology, research and development ==
Research and development was a focus for the company, especially for its founder John Bowers (1922–1987). In 1982, the company opened a research centre titled Steyning Research Establishment (SRE) in Steyning, about 10 miles from Worthing. The buildings were designed for audio-related work since they were previously used by SME, the English tonearm designer. The design of B&W loudspeaker cabinets are the work of industrial designer Kenneth Grange since 1975. Morten Villiers Warren became manager of design in the late 1990s when designing the new 800 series of speakers.

=== Production ===
Bowers & Wilkins has created:

- The patented use of Kevlar fibres, impregnated with a stiffening resin, resulting in B&W's yellow speaker cones started in 1974. This composite material proved to provide controlled rigidity and internal damping, minimizing distortion, as Fryer determined by using laser interferometry on speaker cones.
- Phase linear transmission was realised in the DM6 from 1976. In the DM6, the speakers are mounted in different vertical planes.
- In 1977 the DM7 introduced a tweeter separate from the main speaker cabinet. This has been a feature of many B&W speaker designs since.
- Engineer Laurence Dickie invented the 'Matrix' enclosure which reduces cabinet sound colouration.
- The 'Nautilus' speaker resulted from research commenced by Bowers into 'perfect dipoles'. Before Bowers died, he handed this research to Dickie, who discovered the principle of the exponential tapered tube. Instead of open-backed drivers, it uses drivers loaded by reverse-tapered horns, or exponentially diminishing tubes, to absorb the rear radiation. The construction is based on fibre-reinforced plastic enclosures. The result of the distinct speaker shape was near-zero enclosure colouration.
- The 'Flowport' is an improvement that reduces friction in the air moving through the bass reflex vent. This is realised by covering the surface of the vent with dimples, just like a golf ball.
- The diamond tweeter was developed to create a ratio of tweeter dome mass and material stiffness. The tweeter is grown into shape by chemical vapour deposition.

=== Formation ===
Released in 2019, the Formation Suite consists of Duo, Wedge, Bar, Bass, Audio and Flex.

== Locations ==
The headquarters for Bowers & Wilkins is in Worthing, West Sussex, England, United Kingdom.
