= Directed Electronics =

American automotive security products company

Directed Electronics, Inc.
- Type: Public
- Founded: 1982; 44 years ago, in Cleveland, Ohio
- Headquarters: Orlando, Florida, United States
- Parent: Voxx International
- Website: www.directed.com

Directed Electronics, Inc. is an Orlando, Florida-based producer of car security products, including Viper car alarms and accessories. It is a subsidiary of Voxx Automotive, which is owned by Voxx International.

== History ==
Directed Electronics was founded in Cleveland, Ohio in 1982 by Darrell and Kathy Issa. Darrell served as the company's first CEO.

In 1986, the company headquarters moved to Vista, California, in San Diego County. In 1999, the Issas sold their share of Directed Electronics to Miami, Florida-based private equity firm Trivest.

In 2000, Darrell Issa was elected to the House of Representatives, and Jim Minarik replaced him as CEO.

In 2008, Directed Electronics adapted a holding company strategy, and its parent company became DEI Holdings, Inc.

In 2011, Trivest sold the company to Charlesbank Capital Partners.

In March 2017, the company announced Robert Struble as their new CEO.

In July 2020, Voxx International acquired the majority of Directed's automotive aftermarket business, adding eight brands, headlined by Viper.

== Products ==
The company distributes various brands of car alarms and vehicle start systems, including AstroStart, Automate, Autostart, Avital, Clifford, Python and Viper.
