= Marantz =

American audio company

- Type: Subsidiary
- Industry: Electronics
- Founded: 1953; 73 years ago, in Queens, New York City
- Founder: Saul Marantz
- Headquarters: Carlsbad, California, U.S. Osaka, Japan
- Products: Audio, visual
- Owner: Samsung Electronics
- Parent: Sound United
- Website: www.marantz.com

Marantz is a company that develops and sells high-end audio products. The company was founded in New York, but is now based in California.

== History ==
The first Marantz audio product was designed and built by Saul Marantz in his home in Kew Gardens, New York City. In 1964, Marantz was bought by Superscope, a video production company. As a Superscope subsidiary, Marantz had a major influence in the development of high fidelity audio systems, and reached the high point of their success in the mid to late 1970s.

During the 1980s, while owned by Philips, a pioneer in compact disc technology, Marantz sold some very well received CD players, but other products in the line were not as successful as in the past. Beginning in the early 1990s, Marantz focused on higher-end components. In 2001, Marantz Japan acquired the brand from Philips and owned all overseas sales subsidiaries.

In 2002 Marantz merged with competitor Denon into D&M Holdings Inc., later named D+M Group. On March 1, 2017, Sound United LLC completed the acquisition of D+M Holdings. On September 23, 2025, Sound United was acquired by Harman International.

=== Company timeline ===
- 1952 Saul Marantz sells his first audio product, the "Consolette" pre-amp
- 1964 Marantz acquired by Superscope Inc.
- 1966 Beginning with the Model 25, and then 22 and 28, Marantz starts manufacturing its products in Japan through a partnership with Standard Radio Corp.
- 1974 A manufacturing plant is opened on the Péronnes-lez-Binche site, Walloon Region, Belgium
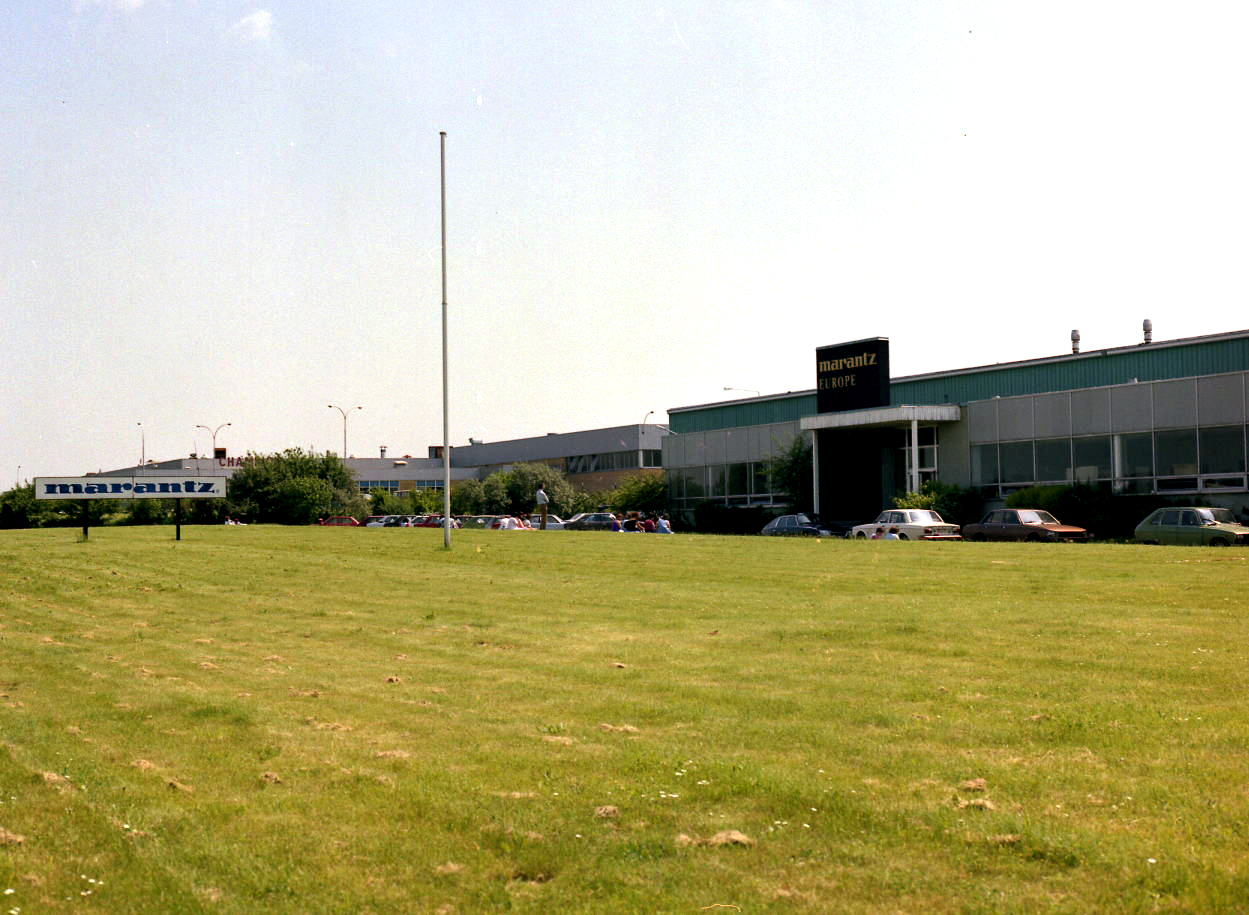
  Marantz Europe (1974~1985)
- 1975 Standard Radio Corp. changes its name to Marantz Japan Inc.
- 1980 Superscope sells the Marantz brand, dealer network, and all overseas assets (except U.S. and Canada) to Philips Electronics
- 1991 Marantz's new digital audio enhancement technology (Marantz Enhanced Digital Stereo) is introduced
- 1992 Philips acquires U.S. and Canada trademarks and dealer network
- 1997 Saul Marantz dies aged 85
- 2001 Marantz Japan Inc. acquires the brand and all overseas sales subsidiaries
- 2002 Marantz Japan and Denon merge to form D&M Holdings, to later be joined by other higher-end audio equipment brands such as Boston Acoustics
- 2008 Philips sells its remaining stake in D&M Holdings, ending a 28-year relationship between Philips and Marantz
- 2014 Marantz Professional acquired by inMusic Brands
- 2017 Sound United LLC acquires D+M Group
- 2019 Ken Ishiwata dies aged 72
- 2022 Masimo acquires Sound United LLC
- 2025 Harman (owned by Samsung) buys Marantz, Bowers & Wilkins, Denon and Polk from Masimo

== Products ==
Selected products:

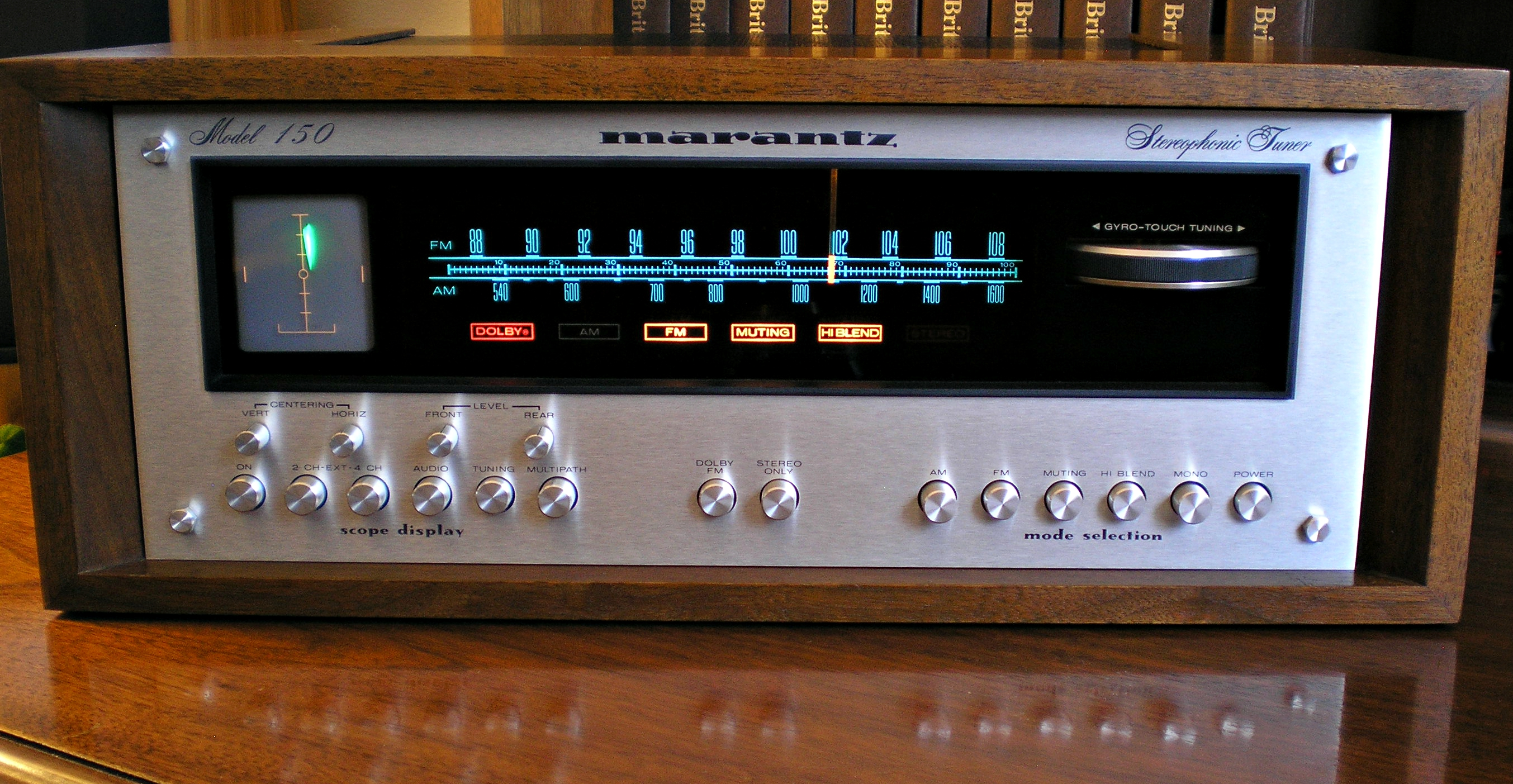
Marantz 150 tuner with oscilloscope (1975–1978)

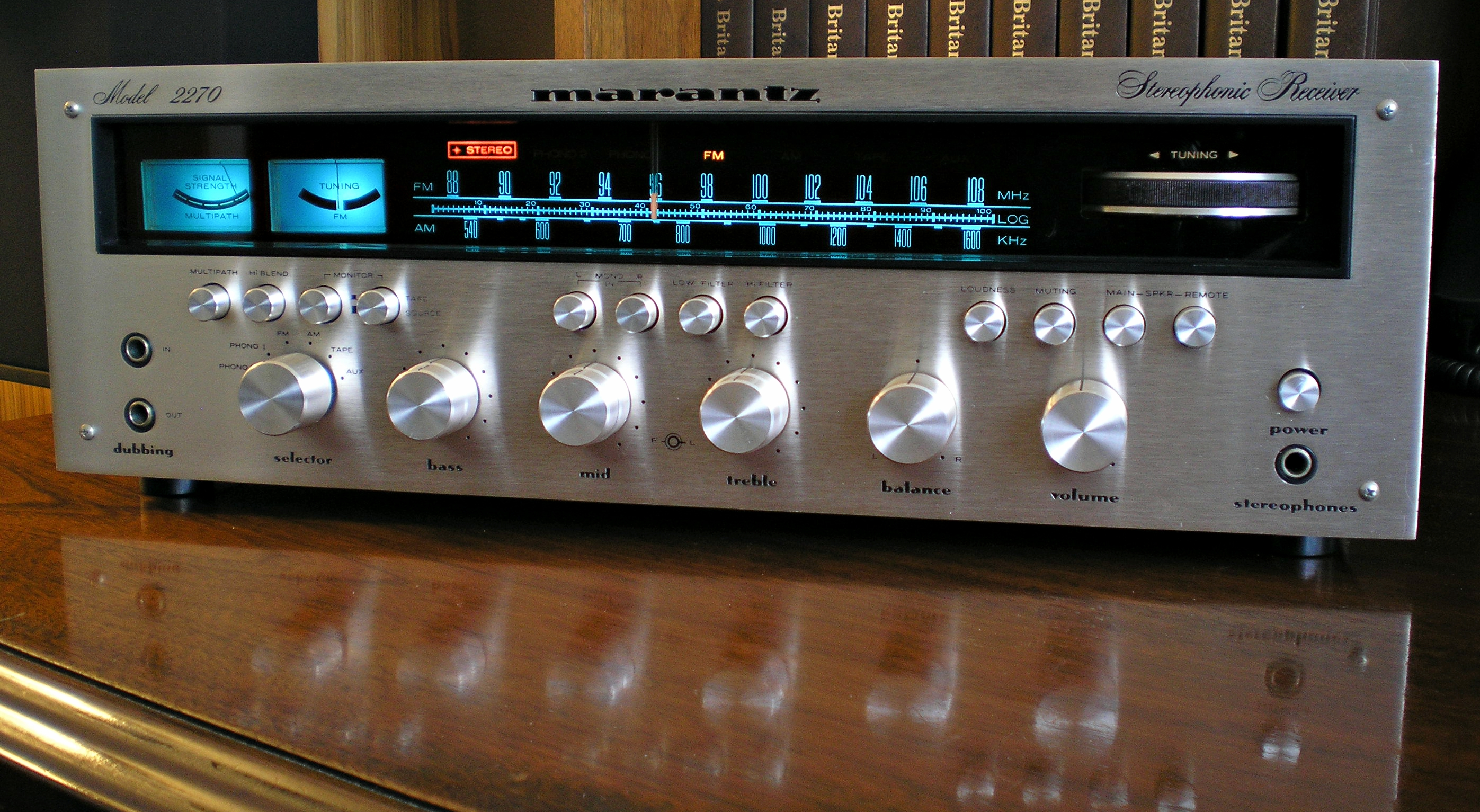
Marantz 2270 receiver

- Marantz 2325 Receiver
- Marantz 5420 Cassette Deck
- Marantz 2275 Receiver
- Marantz 2600 – Marantz's most powerful receiver
- Marantz 10b Tuner
- Marantz 2385 Receiver
- Marantz HD77 – Four-way, high-fidelity loudspeaker system
- Marantz PMD-660 – solid-state recorder
- Marantz CD63, CD63SE and variants - iconic CD player range
- Marantz UD7007 - Universal HD Blu-ray player
- Marantz PM-KI Ruby - Ken Ishiwata signature reference 2 channel integrated amplifier
- Marantz MM8077 - 7 channel amplifier with XLR and RCA inputs
- Marantz M-CR612 - Network CD receiver
- Marantz SR7011 - 9.2 Channel Network Receiver
- Marantz SR8012 - 11.2 Channel Network AV Receiver
- Marantz SR8015 - 11.2 Channel Network Flagship AV Receiver
- Marantz AV8805 - 13.2 Channel Network AV Pre-Amplifier
