= James Hilton (designer) =

British graphic designer

- Born: James Hilton; 3 May 1973 (age 53); Merseyside, England
- Occupation: Designer
- Years active: 1995–present

James Hilton is a British designer.

He co-founded the creative agency AKQA and over the course of twenty years grew it to become one the world's most successful digital agencies. In 2014 Hilton left AKQA to found the experimental design studio AtelierStrange and custom motorcycle brand Death Machines of London. He joined the design company Native as their Chief Creative Officer in December 2016.

== Education ==
Upon completion of his HND at Southampton Solent University, he applied for a degree in Graphic Design at the same college. He was denied a place on the basis that "there's nothing more we can teach you. Get out there and start doing something".

== AKQA ==
Hilton co-founded AKQA together with Ajaz Ahmed, Dan Norris-Jones and Matthew Treagus in 1995. It is a full-service digital experience design, development and communications agency owned by WPP. The company expanded internationally in 2001 through a merger with agencies based in the United States and Singapore. It operated as an independent agency until 2012, when it was acquired by WPP. Initially the firm focused on technology and digital projects, later broadening its focus on design and innovation to services including AI, product and spatial design.

The agency initially focused on digital projects, including product development. One of AKQA's early clients was Virgin, for which the agency designed the first website capable of broadcasting live radio over the Internet for Virgin Radio. Other initial clients included Microsoft, Warner Bros., BMW, and Coca-Cola.

As it grew in the late 1990s, it added capabilities including a consultancy arm, to meet with client demand for Internet strategy consulting. By 1999, it was ranked as the largest independent new media agency in the United Kingdom, and had been valued at £26 million.

In 2005, the agency designed the user interface for the Xbox 360, creating a dashboard and guide for users to navigate the gaming and entertainment functions of the console.

In 2006, Advertising Age's Creativity magazine created its inaugural Interactive Agency of the Year award and presented it to AKQA, recognising the agency's "global culture, creative hires and technological muscle." Said the magazine's editor, Teressa Iezzi, "We thought AKQA embodied the spirit of the big-idea-first approach."

In 2010, AKQA took home Agency of the Year for the second year running at the Revolution Awards, AKQA's work for Fiat eco:Drive won them the Cannes Cyber Lion Grand Prix in 2009. In 2011 the agency won five Cannes Lions, winning three gold Cyber Lions, one silver and one bronze. AKQA was named Revolution's Agency of the Decade (for 1997 to 2007).

In 2013, it won 14 Lions including a gold Cyber Lion for Nike+ Kinect Training and a Titanium and Integrated Lion for Nike "Find your greatness". In June of the same year, WPP bought a majority stake in AKQA valuing the company at $350m USD.

In 2014, AKQA received the Queen's Awards for Enterprise in the "Innovation" category for "consistent contribution and outstanding achievement", and was named Most Innovative Agency in the same year by the Digiday Awards.

In November 2014, after completing the award-winning interior redesign of AKQA's London office, Hilton announced his departure from AKQA.

== Death Machines of London ==
Hilton launched the custom motorcycle brand Death Machines of London at the BikeShed Paris show in April 2016 with their Moto Guzzi Airtail. The bike and brand received global coverage for their imaginative take on the Moto Guzzi, and their provocative brand name.

Their 'Up Yours Copper' earned the brand worldwide recognition with coverage in Highsnobiety, British GQ and Hypebeast.

'Airforce' gained worldwide attention, with Designboom calling it "the best motorcycle design of 2018".

DesignBoom also lauded 'Kenzo' as being the garage's "most radical build to date".

GQ called Death Machines of London "The coolest thing in the world right now"

== Native ==
Hilton joined the award-winning industrial and experience design company Native Design in December 2016 as Chief Creative Officer. There he led the rebrand of the HP Omen gaming platform which Forbes described as "Extraordinarily strong".

== Accolades, speaking and writing ==
Hilton has collected a multitude of global awards including Grand Prix and Gold Cannes Lions, and has also served as a judge for Cannes Lions, Webby Awards, D&AD, and as Jury Chairman for the Clio Awards and EuroBest. He is also an executive member of The International Academy of Digital Arts and Sciences.

In 2010, Hilton was appointed into the Creativity 50, a list of the world's fifty most influential and inspiring creative personalities.

In 2011, 2012 and 2013, he was named as the UK's number one digital creative director, and AKQA 'Agency of the Year' by Campaign magazine in the UK, and AdWeek in the US.

Hilton is an international speaker and has conducted talks at universities and schools of creativity across the world including Oxford University, BCIT and twice at TEDx. Hilton is also Visiting Professor at Southampton Solent University.

As a writer and columnist, Hilton has contributed to books on creativity and thought leadership including Velocity, which he also designed, and Spark For The Fire. He writes for the magazine Campaign and is a regular columnist for Shots.

Hilton is a key mentor, instructor, and curriculum curator for the Future London Academy, specifically for their Executive Programme for Design Leaders, where he teaches senior design leadership, strategy, and business value.
