= Digital design =

Digital design may refer to:

- Digital product design, a field in design which is focused on user interface design or interaction design
- Logic synthesis, a process by which an abstract specification of desired circuit behavior is turned into a design implementation in terms of logic gates
