= Sean Yazbeck =

British businessman

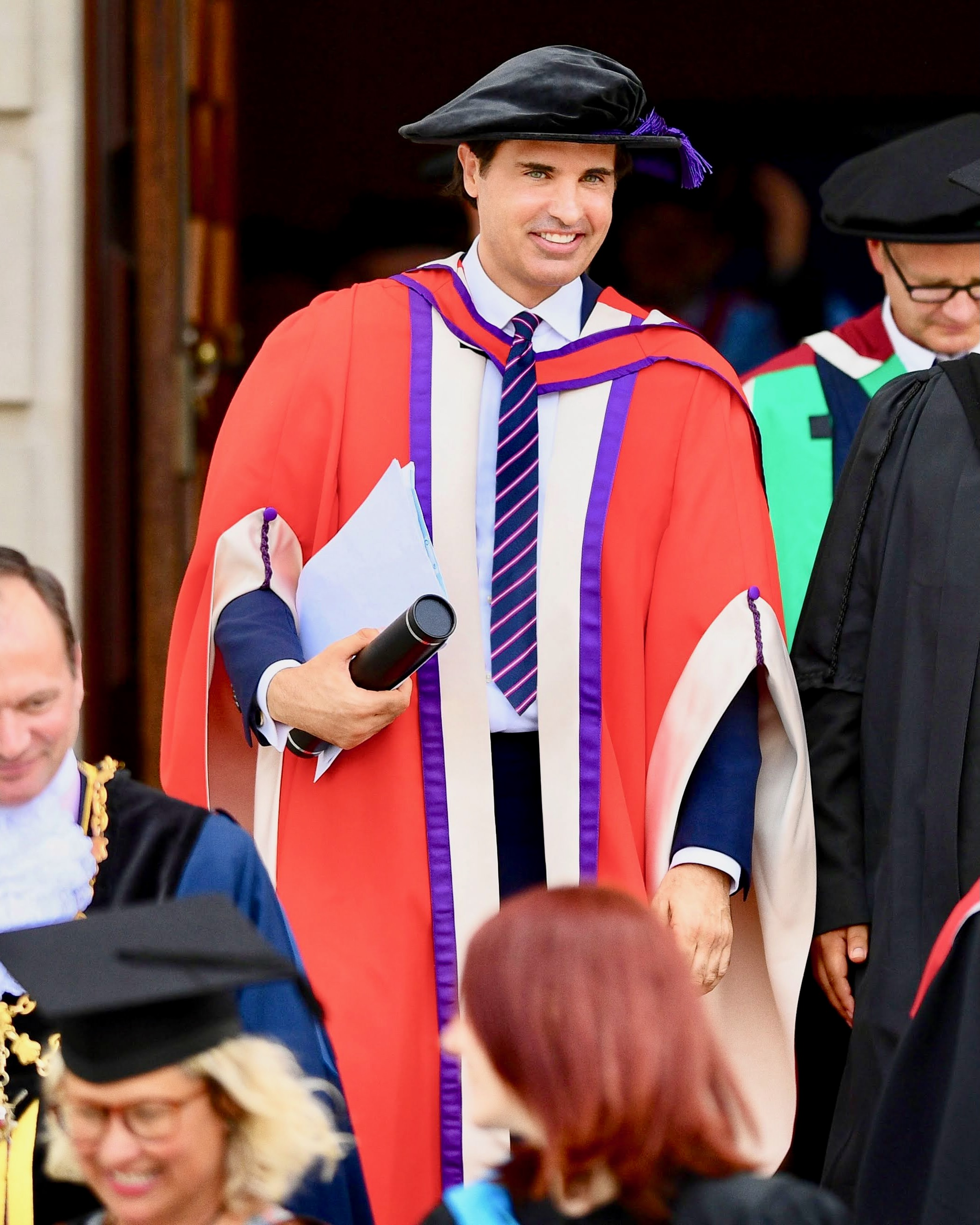
- Born: London, England
- Citizenship: United States; United Kingdom
- Education: Solent University (BA, PhD hc)
- Occupations: Businessman; Entrepreneur
- Website: scopeworker.com

Sean Yazbeck is a British-American businessman. He is the founder of multiple enterprise software and technology services companies. He is the winner of the fifth season of Donald Trump's reality show, The Apprentice.

== Career ==
After winning The Apprentice, Yazbeck was selected by Donald Trump to build The Dominick (formerly Trump SoHo) a $450 million, hotel condominium located in Manhattan, New York City.

Yazbeck founded the technology services company, Wavsys. In 2011, Wavsys was included in Inc.'s "500 Fastest Growing Companies in America" list, with over $100 million per annum in revenue and over 500 employees.

Yazbeck co-founded Scopeworker, an enterprise resource planning (ERP) software platform, alongside Lieutenant General David Leakey, former Director General of the European Union Military Staff and former Black Rod at the UK's Houses of Parliament. In 2018, The Wall Street Journal reported that Scopeworker had secured a multi-billion-dollar deal with Sprint Corporation (now T-Mobile US) to automate supplier services for its 5G network rollout.

== Awards and honors ==
Yazbeck has received multiple recognitions, distinctions, and awards for contributions to business, academia, and public service.

- The U.S. government awarded Yazbeck the EB-1 visa green card for "persons of extraordinary ability", recognizing "extraordinary achievement" in his professional field with "sustained international acclaim".
- In 2006, Yazbeck won Donald Trump's, The Apprentice. Throughout the competition, he remained unbeaten as Project Manager. His ten task victories tie him with Season 3 winner Kendra Todd for the most wins by any candidate in the history of the show.
- In 2006, the Mayor of Miami-Dade County, Carlos Álvarez, proclaimed June 20th as "Sean Yazbeck Day" in Miami-Dade County, in recognition of Yazbeck's professional achievements and contributions to public service.
- In 2008, Kentucky Governor Steve Beshear awarded Yazbeck the honorary title of Kentucky Colonel. It was "in recognition of noteworthy accomplishments and outstanding service to the nation," for his charitable work with Voices for America's Children.
- In 2011, Yazbeck's company, Wavsys, was recognized as an Inc 500 "Fastest Growing Company in America".
- In 2014, Kevin McGurgan OBE, the UK's Deputy Trade Commissioner for North America, presented Yazbeck with the 'Entrepreneur of the Year' award at the BritWeek Business Innovation Awards, hosted by the UK's Department for Business and Trade (formerly UKTI).
- In 2017, Yazbeck was appointed a Visiting Fellow at Solent University in recognition of his notable business accomplishments and contributions to public service.
- In 2018, Yazbeck received an honorary Doctor of Business degree from Solent University for his business achievements and contributions to public service.

== Philanthropy ==
Yazbeck has supported various philanthropic initiatives and serves as a patron of numerous British and American foundations focused on arts, education, and heritage.

In 2019, Yazbeck donated £100,000 to Solent University to establish a digital innovation centre specializing in software development and artificial intelligence. Yazbeck stated that "British universities are increasingly driving the nation's rapid growth in technology-based industries" and noted that "Britain is perfectly positioned to become the world's next Silicon Valley." Solent University estimated the centre increased graduate employability by up to 15%.

In 2025, Yazbeck donated £50,000 to University College London (UCL) to support new research into bacteriophage therapeutics targeting antimicrobial resistance (AMR). Yazbeck stated, "The UK is widely recognized as a global leader in biomedical research, making it the ideal environment to advance crucial innovations like bacteriophage therapy." Baroness Julia Neuberger, Chair of the University College London Hospitals NHS Foundation Trust and peer in the House of Lords, commented that "Sean Yazbeck's donation represents an important contribution towards addressing antimicrobial resistance, a significant public health threat to the UK."

Yazbeck is a patron of the Kensington and Chelsea Foundation's Philanthropy Circle, which supports charitable initiatives aimed at improving the lives of disadvantaged and vulnerable residents within London's Royal Borough of Kensington and Chelsea.

He serves as a patron of two Miami-based institutions, the New World Symphony and the Pérez Art Museum Miami."

Yazbeck's previous philanthropic activities include serving as a national spokesperson for Voices for America's Children, a charity supporting children in foster care.

== Personal life ==
Yazbeck was born in the Royal Borough of Kensington and Chelsea in London to a Lebanese Maronite Christian father from Chouf and an Irish mother. He attended William Ellis School in Highgate, London, and graduated with a First Class Honors Degree from Solent University, Southampton.

Yazbeck is a U.S. citizen and resides in Miami Beach, Florida. He plays polo for the Grand Champions Polo Club in Palm Beach, Florida. He is a member of YPO (Young Presidents' Organization), a global network of young chief executives.

== The Apprentice season 5 ==
Yazbeck was selected to appear on The Apprentice because he had been awarded the EB-1 visa green card for "persons of extraordinary ability". Yazbeck and Piers Morgan are the only non-Americans to have won Donald Trump's The Apprentice. Both are British.

Throughout the season, Yazbeck remained unbeaten as Project Manager and he achieved ten task victories, tying him with the Season 3 winner, Kendra Todd, for the most task wins by any candidate in the history of The Apprentice.

He was chosen by Trump to be the winner during the show's live finale in Los Angeles. According to Trump, Yazbeck overwhelmingly won the national vote, the first ever conducted for an Apprentice finale.

In the final task, Yazbeck successfully organized and managed a charity concert featuring the Barenaked Ladies. Sponsored by Pontiac, the event raised funds for the World Wildlife Fund. For winning the final task and being hired as Trump's Apprentice, Yazbeck chose to manage the development of the Trump SoHo project in New York City, a role accompanied by a one-year contract exceeding $250,000. He was also given a new Pontiac G6 hardtop convertible, mirroring Kendra Todd's reward of a Pontiac Solstice.

Following his victory, Yazbeck returned to the show as a boardroom judge on The Apprentice 6. He later hosted his own show, Reality Trailblazers, on the TV Guide Channel. Additionally, he appeared as a judge at the Miss Universe pageant, and was featured on numerous television shows including Live with Regis and Kelly, MTV Video Music Awards, 1 vs. 100, Soap Talk, Identity and MTV's From G's to Gents.
