= Southampton Solent University =

University in Southampton, England

- Coat of arms
- Latin: Solent Universitas
- Former names: Solent University (2018–2024); Southampton Institute of Higher Education (1984–2005)
- Motto: Ready for the future
- Type: Public
- Established: 2005 – University status 2004 – Degree-awarding powers 1984 – Southampton Institute of Higher Education (merger); 1978 – Southampton College of Higher Education (merger of Colleges of Technology and Art); 1951 – Southampton College of Technology; 1932 – School of Navigation, Warsash; 1856 – Southampton College of Art
- Academic affiliations: Universities UK; GuildHE; Million+
- Endowment: £0.81M (2015)
- Chancellor: Theo Paphitis
- Vice-Chancellor: Professor James Knowles
- Students: 8,515 HE (2024/25)
- Undergraduates: 7,825 (2024/25)
- Postgraduates: 685 (2024/25)
- Other students: 6,815 FE
- Location: Southampton, Hampshire, England; 50.908°N 1.401°W
- Campus: Urban city campus
- Colours: Dark red and black
- Sporting affiliations: British Universities and Colleges Sport; Snows Group Hampshire 2
- Website: solent.ac.uk

Southampton Solent University (formerly and commonly known as Solent University) is a public university based in Southampton, Hampshire, England. It has approximately 10,500 students (2019/20). Its main campus is located on East Park Terrace near the city centre and the maritime hub of Southampton.

Solent University students are represented by Solent Students' Union, which is based on the East Park Terrace campus.

== History ==
The university's origins can be traced back to a private School of Art founded in 1856, which eventually became the Southampton College of Art. Mergers with the Southampton College of Technology, and later the College of Nautical Studies at Warsash, led to the establishment of the Southampton Institute of Higher Education in 1984.

Southampton Institute became a university on 12 July 2005, adopting the name Southampton Solent University on 15 August that year. Prior to this, Southampton Institute provided assistance to Nottingham Trent University in its provision of business-focused degrees, relating to accountancy, finance and professional ACCA qualifications; some Nottingham Trent University certificates included Southampton Institute/Solent University stamps to indicate this agreement.

In 2015, Solent University came to an agreement with New College of the Humanities, London, whereby it would validate some of their degrees. In November 2017, the Privy Council approved the change of name of Southampton Solent University to Solent University, with effect from 2018. In 2024, the university proposed a return to their previous name, citing 'research that suggests reinstating the location of the university into the name is an important factor in both its collaboration with local and national stakeholders and likely success in future recruitment'. On 24 September 2024, the university officially reverted to its former name, Southampton Solent University.

Since April 2023, the current Vice Chancellor is Professor James Knowles.

== Campus ==
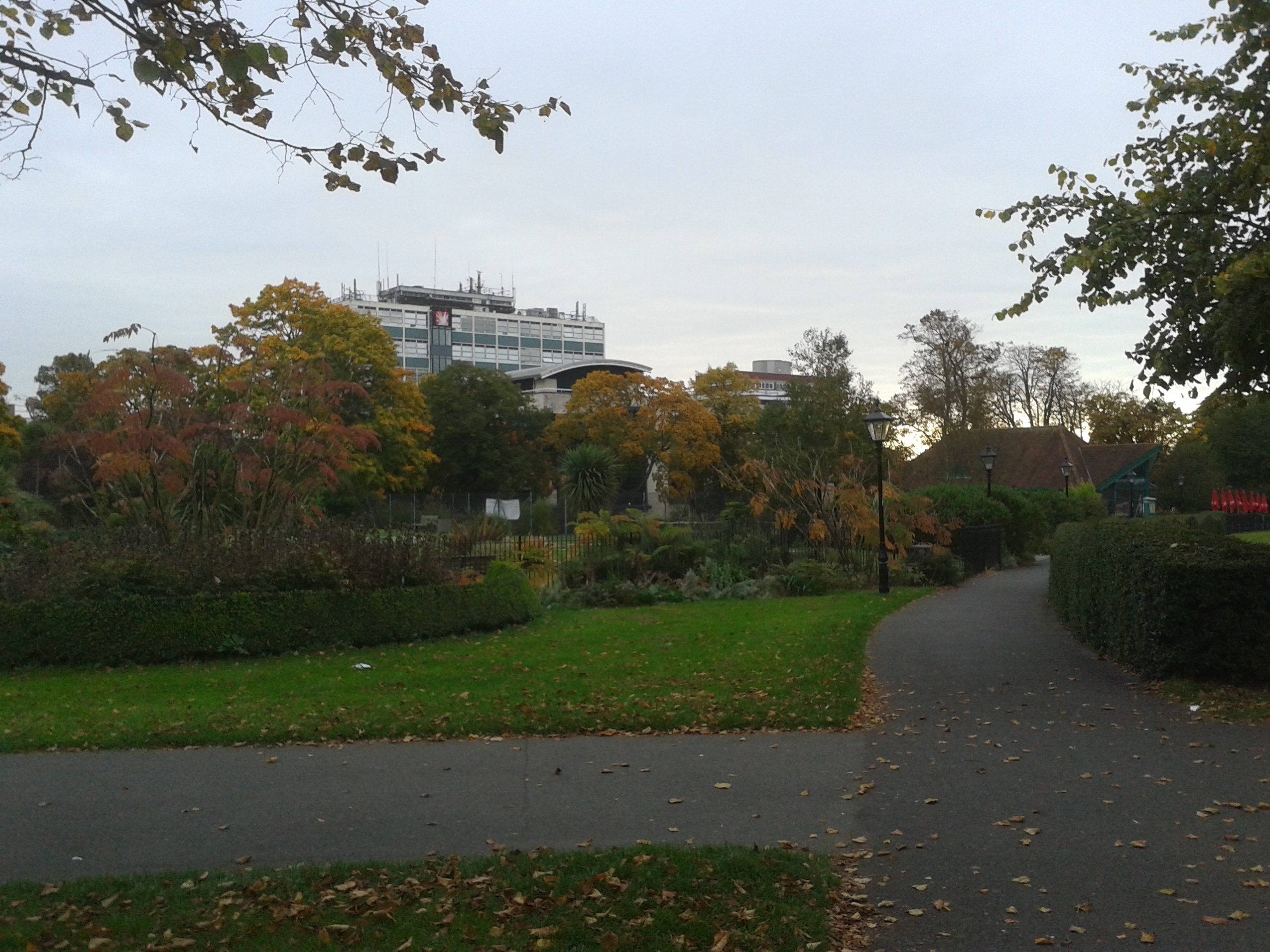
Main campus of Solent University (East park Terrace)

The university has three primary locations:

- East Park Terrace is the primary campus of the university and was established in the 1960s. It is on the east side of East Park, in central Southampton.
- The Warsash School of Maritime Science and Engineering is on the eastern bank of the Hamble River overlooking Southampton Water.
- Timsbury Lake hosts the Manned Model Training Centre for Warsash. It opened in 2011.

Outside of the above, the university also has facilities at external locations:

- Test Park Sports Ground, an outdoor sports facility situated in Millbrook, in the north west of the city. It opened in 2011.
- Re:So is a student-run shop based in the Marlands shopping centre in central Southampton. It sells items created by alumni as well as current students of creative courses. It is also used for some work-based learning projects.

=== Halls of residence ===
The university has four major student Halls complexes:

- Chantry
- Deanery
- Kimber (incorporating the David Moxon Annexe)

All the halls are located away from the main teaching buildings. They are all located south east of the city centre, between the St Mary's and Ocean Village areas of Southampton.

=== Former locations ===
- The Lucia Foster Welch residence was under lease from 1995 to 2020; the lease was not renewed during the COVID-19 pandemic.
- The Sir James Matthews building on Guildhall Square had been in use since 1993, but was left empty in 2019 after the law and digital courses were relocated. It was sold to Southampton University in July 2021 for £5.5m; Solent retained use of some specialist performance spaces for three years after the sale.
- The Below Bar campus, formerly known as Southampton School of Art, was operational from 2011 to 2023, and was a centre for the art & design courses. It was based in a renovated property under lease.
- The Austen building was leased from 2017 to 2024 for the use of Warsash. This was situated in the St. Mary's campus of Southampton College.

== Academic profile ==
Rankings
National rankings
- Complete (2027): 102
- Guardian (2027): 67
- Times / Sunday Times (2027): 121

Solent University is a comprehensive university offering programmes across five academic faculties, including the Faculty of Business, Law and Digital Technologies (which incorporates the Solent Business School and the Solent Law School), the Faculty of Creative Industries, Architecture and Engineering, the Faculty of Sport, Health and Social Science, and Warsash Maritime School.

The university also has links with local and regional businesses, professional bodies and industry groups, all with a focus on providing the best routes into the workforce (for example the British Computer Society, Creative Skillset and the PTC).

The student yachting team have often consisted of Olympians and are previous world champions.

== Research ==
The university also has a Research, Innovation and Enterprise Office, providing a researcher development programme and the Research, Innovation and Knowledge Exchange Awards.

=== Creative and digital industries ===
In 2025, lecturer Roy Hanney introduced a module on duanju, a format of vertical short dramas that originated in China. The course combines theoretical study with practical project development in collaboration with local creative industries.

=== Business and society ===
Working with private, public and third sector industries, Solent focuses on research areas such as marketing, the 'visitor economy', SME partnerships, international economic development, entrepreneurship and innovation, and cyber-crime. A particular focus is social policy in relation to employment, gender, and diversity in areas ranging from maritime and seafarers, to music and culture.

=== Sport, health and wellbeing ===
Solent University has emerged as a provider of academic programmes relating to the study of sport, health and wellbeing. These programmes are informed by research in areas such as sports science, sports development, the sociology of sport, psychology, health and wellbeing, and social care.

A focus of current research is how sport can be used as a vehicle for social change. Research in sports science focuses on strength and conditioning, the physiological basis of human performance in a range of sub-elite and elite sporting environments, and the psychology of the coaching process. The university is also recognised as one of the leading centres for football-based research.

=== Maritime, technology and environment ===
Historically, one of the research strengths of Solent has been the maritime sector. Having run courses in yacht design and boat yard management since the 1970s and then by adding Warsash Maritime Academy with its long history and association with shipping, ports and seafarer training in the late 1990s this is now fully integrated as the Warsash School of Maritime Science and Engineering.

The focus is on applied research and innovation that affect industry, including a focus on maritime education and training (including the use of technology), employment, health and safety, gender, and welfare. They also have a developing area of research relating to sustainability and resilience, including environmental accounting, life-cycle assessment; environmental impacts, and modelling. Other areas of research include materials science and additive manufacturing; acoustics; computer networks, immersive technologies, multimedia communication, and software engineering; as well as sustainable design and the built environment. It also hosts the China Centre (Maritime).

=== Media Technology ===
The Media Technology courses (such as the Broadcast Engineering, Live Sound and Acoustics courses) have now been merged into one 'Live Event Technology' course which covers all of these bases.

This course works with Sonar Events to provide technical skills for their productions. They also work at festivals in the UK, such as Glastonbury and Boardmasters.

== Student life ==
=== Student Media ===
The TV and Live Events Societies at Solent University are covered by the umbrella brand of 'Sonar Events'. These outlets are run entirely by students.

==== TV station ====
The student-run television station operated under the name SonarTV; it was founded in 2009 as part of the student media rebrand within the Students' Union. in 2022, SonarTV rebranded to join the Live Events Society to form SonarEvents; the new and current name for the societies.

SonarEvents are the only outlet within the university that can affiliate with NaSTA (The National Student Television Association), and in 2012 was selected to be the joint host for the first-ever NaSTAvision broadcast with Staffs TV of Staffordshire University.

==== Radio station ====
The student-run Radio Station is called Radio Sonar. It was founded in 1999 and was originally known as Sin FM. The name came from the first 28-day FM radio licence held by the station. After applying for a Low Powered AM (LPAM) licence, the station changed its name to Sin Radio and at the same time became an online radio station; the name was changed to Radio Sonar in 2009. (The rename was in conjunction with all Student Union media, part of the Sonar Media rebrand.) Radio Sonar won the award for 'Outstanding Contribution to Student Radio' at the National Student Radio Conference in 2010 and again in 2011; in 2012, Mel Lewis won Best Female Presenter. Radio Sonar was nominated in the 2014 SRA awards for 'Best Chart Show' and achieved third place.

=== Sport ===
Southampton Solent University has a long tradition of sailing, and has won the student national yachting championships on occasions.

== Notable alumni ==
Name	Notability	Course	Ref
William Adkin	Cricket Player		
Joseph Garrett	YouTuber	Undergraduate - Film and Television	
Paul Goodison MBE	Olympic Gold medalist in sailing	Undergraduate - Maritime Studies; Honorary Doctorate in Sport	
James Hilton	Designer associated with the AKQA agency.		
Santiago Lange	Olympic Multiple Medalist in Sailing including Gold medal in 2016	Undergraduate - Yacht & Boat Design Diploma	
Camille Lepage	French photojournalist		
Helena Lucas MBE	Paralympic Gold medalist in sailing	Undergraduate - Yacht & Powercraft Design BEng; Honorary Doctorate of Sport	
Una Nwajei	England women's footballer		
Jenny Packham	Fashion Designer	Undergraduate - Fashion; Honorary Doctorate of Design	
Brad Pauls	British middleweight boxing champion	Fitness and personal training	
David Quayle	Co-founder of B&Q		
Jonathan Ross OBE	TV and radio presenter	Approx 1978 Southampton College of Art	
Ricky Whittle	Actor	Undergraduate - Criminology and Law	
Sean Yazbeck	Entrepreneur and Reality TV Star	Undergraduate - Media with Cultural Studies; Honorary Doctorate of Business	

== See also ==
- Armorial of UK universities
- List of universities in the United Kingdom
