= The Apprentice (American TV series) season 5 =

The Apprentice
- Season 5
- No. of contestants: 18
- Winner: Sean Yazbeck
- Runner-up: Lee Bienstock
- No. of episodes: 15

Release
- Original network: NBC
- Original release: February 27 – June 5, 2006

Additional information
- Filming dates: September 2005 – November 2005

Season chronology
- ← Previous; Season 4 Next → Season 6

The Apprentice 5 is the fifth season of The Apprentice, with Donald Trump as the executive producer and host. Applications were available online (as in previous seasons) and filming occurred in the fall of 2005. Sean Yazbeck was named the winner and hired by Donald Trump as the new Apprentice during the season finale. Lee Bienstock, the runner-up to Yazbeck, proved to be very competitive and was hired outside of television a few months later.

This season of the show was the first to not rank in the Top 50 according to Nielsen ratings and the first to garner less than 10 million viewers on average; it ranked #51 with an average of 9.73 million viewers. This was the last season to have George H. Ross and Carolyn Kepcher as main boardroom judges, although Ross's role was largely taken over by Bill Rancic in this season. The show moved to Los Angeles, California the following season and Donald Trump's children became the most prominent judges after him.

The Apprentice 5 on Monday February 27, 2006, right after the new hit game show Deal or No Deal. NBC, facing a ratings slump, opted to put future seasons of the show on Monday nights (as opposed to its past Thursday 9 pm ET slot). The network hoped to build the show's audience by making this move, as the program had witnessed a fairly substantial erosion in ratings since The Apprentice 1. However, the show faced tough competition with the Fox's fifth season of 24. The finale for The Apprentice 5 took place in Los Angeles on June 5, 2006. Season five's finale was the lowest rated ever, down 23% from season four and down 28% from season three's final episode (in the important 18–49 demographic).

The Apprentice 5 marked the debut of Donald Trump's children, Ivanka Trump and Donald Trump Jr., as boardroom judges when either George and/or Carolyn were unavailable. Jack McConnell, the First Minister of Scotland, makes an appearance in one of the episodes.

For the first time in Apprentice history, all episodes of this season (including the Clipshow with never-seen-before footage) could be obtained at iTunes for indefinite viewing after the episode has aired.

Also, for the first time since the original season of the show, the successful project managers would not be exempt from firing the next week, therefore everyone had to do a satisfactory job in order to be safe. The season featured 3 double firings.

== Candidates ==
This is the first season where not all of the candidates were exclusively American; this season contained cast members that were originally from Uzbekistan and the United Kingdom.

Team 1	Team 2
Gold Rush	Synergy

Candidate	Background	Original team	Age	Hometown	Result
Sean Yazbeck	Recruitment consultant	Synergy	33	London, England	Hired by Trump (6–5–2006)
Lee Bienstock	Business analyst	Gold Rush	22	Brooklyn, New York	Fired in the season finale (6–5–2006)
Allie Jablon	Medical sales manager	Synergy	30	Columbia, South Carolina	Fired in week 13 (5–22–2006)
Roxanne Wilson	Appellate attorney	Synergy	26	Austin, Texas	Fired in week 13 (5–22–2006)
Tammy Trenta	Wealth manager	Synergy	33	Edison, New Jersey	Fired in week 12 (5–15–2006)
Michael Laungani	Management consultant	Synergy	29	Chicago, Illinois	Fired in week 11 (5–8–2006)
Tarek Saab	Hi-tech manager	Gold Rush	27	New Bedford, Massachusetts	Fired in week 10 (5–1–2006)
Charmaine Hunt	Real estate consultant	Gold Rush	27	Nashville, Tennessee	Fired in week 10 (5–1–2006)
Andrea Lake	Sticker company owner	Synergy	31	San Diego, California	Fired in week 9 (4–24–2006)
Leslie Bourgeois	Realtor	Gold Rush	28	Houma, Louisiana	Fired in week 8 (4–10–2006)
Lenny Veltman	Trading company owner	Gold Rush	37	Tashkent, Uzbekistan	Fired in week 7 (4–10–2006)
Bryce Gahagan	Home builder	Gold Rush	28	Kansas City, Missouri	Fired in week 6 (4–3–2006)
Dan Brody	Clothing company owner	Gold Rush	31	Miami, Florida	Fired in week 5 (3–27–2006)
Brent Buckman	Attorney	Synergy	30	Fort Lauderdale, Florida	Fired in week 4 (3–20–2006)
Theresa Boutross	Psychotherapist	Gold Rush	36	Barrington, Illinois	Fired in week 3 (3–13–2006)
Jose "Pepi" Diaz	Attorney	Synergy	25	Miami, Florida	Fired in week 2 (3–6–2006)
Stacy Schneider	Criminal defense attorney	Synergy	38	New York, New York	Fired in week 2 (3–6–2006)
Summer Zervos	Restaurant owner	Gold Rush	30	Huntington Beach, California	Fired in week 1 (2–27–2006)

== Team selections ==
As with the previous season of the show, Trump hand-picked the candidates. Furthermore, Trump personally selected Tarek and Allie to be the very first project managers and to draft their own teams before the first task is issued. This is the first time in the history of The Apprentice that the teams were not formed by a certain set of characteristics, such as gender (Seasons 1, 2, 4) or educational status (Season 3).

Because this process was conducted after only preliminary introductions, some reasoning for certain selections had been somewhat arbitrary—such as Tarek picking Dan because he was a father, or Allie picking Tammy because she had the qualities of "a real tiger".

Using alternate selections, one at a time, both of them picked their respective teams in the following order:

	Synergy	Gold Rush
PM	Allie	Tarek
1	Tammy	Dan
2	Andrea	Bryce
3	Michael	Charmaine
4	Sean	Leslie
5	Roxanne	Theresa
6	Stacy	Lee
7	Pepi	Summer
8	Brent	Lenny

== Weekly results ==
Candidate	Original team	Week 8 team	Week 11 team	Final week team	Application result	Record as project manager
Sean Yazbeck	Synergy	Synergy	Gold Rush	Synergy	Hired by Trump	2–0 (win in weeks 6 & 12)
Lee Bienstock	Gold Rush	Gold Rush	Gold Rush	Gold Rush	Fired in the Season Finale	3–1 (win in weeks 2, 9, & 13, loss in week 11)
Roxanne Wilson	Synergy	Synergy	Synergy	Gold Rush	Fired in week 13	2–0 (win in weeks 5 & 11)
Allie Jablon	Synergy	Synergy	Synergy		Fired in week 13	1–2 (win in week 1, loss in weeks 9 & 13)
Tammy Trenta	Synergy	Synergy	Synergy	Synergy	Fired in week 12	1–2 (win in week 10, loss in weeks 4 & 12)
Michael Laungani	Synergy	Gold Rush	Gold Rush		Fired in week 11	1–0 (win in week 7)
Tarek Saab	Gold Rush	Gold Rush		Synergy	Fired in week 10	0–1 (loss in week 1)
Charmaine Hunt	Gold Rush	Gold Rush			Fired in week 10	1–1 (win in week 4, loss in week 10)
Andrea Lake	Synergy	Synergy		Synergy	Fired in week 9	2–0 (win in weeks 3 & 8)
Leslie Bourgeois	Gold Rush	Gold Rush			Fired in week 8	0–1 (loss in week 8)
Lenny Veltman	Gold Rush			Gold Rush	Fired in week 7	0–1 (loss in week 7)
Bryce Gahagan	Gold Rush				Fired in week 6	0–1 (loss in week 6)
Dan Brody	Gold Rush				Fired in week 5	0–1 (loss in week 5)
Brent Buckman	Synergy				Fired in week 4	
Theresa Boutross	Gold Rush				Fired in week 3	0–1 (loss in week 3)
Jose "Pepi" Diaz	Synergy			Gold Rush	Fired in week 2	0–1 (loss in week 2)
Stacy Schneider	Synergy				Fired in week 2	
Summer Zervos	Gold Rush				Fired in week 1	

Elimination Chart
No.	Candidate	1	2	3	4	5	6	7	8	9	10	11	12	13	14
1	Sean	IN	IN	IN	IN	IN	WIN	IN	IN	IN	IN	BR	WIN	IN	HIRED
2	Lee	BR	WIN	IN	IN	BR	BR	IN	BR	WIN	IN	LOSE	IN	WIN	FIRED
3	Roxanne	IN	IN	IN	IN	WIN	IN	IN	IN	IN	IN	WIN	BR	FIRED	
4	Allie	WIN	IN	IN	IN	IN	IN	IN	IN	LOSE	IN	IN	BR	FIRED	
5	Tammy	IN	IN	IN	LOSE	IN	IN	IN	IN	IN	WIN	IN	FIRED		
6	Michael	IN	BR	IN	IN	IN	IN	WIN	IN	IN	IN	FIRED			
7	Tarek	LOSE	IN	BR	IN	BR	IN	IN	IN	IN	FIRED				
8	Charmaine	IN	IN	IN	WIN	IN	IN	IN	IN	IN	FIRED				
9	Andrea	IN	IN	WIN	IN	IN	IN	IN	WIN	FIRED					
10	Leslie	IN	IN	IN	IN	IN	IN	IN	FIRED						
11	Lenny	BR	IN	BR	IN	IN	BR	FIRED							
12	Bryce	IN	IN	IN	IN	IN	FIRED								
13	Dan	IN	IN	IN	IN	FIRED									
14	Brent	IN	BR	IN	FIRED										
15	Theresa	IN	IN	FIRED											
16	Pepi	IN	FIRED												
17	Stacy	IN	FIRED												
18	Summer	FIRED													

The candidate was on the losing team.
The candidate was hired and won the competition.
The candidate won as project manager on his/her team.
The candidate lost as project manager on his/her team.
The candidate was brought to the final boardroom.
The candidate was fired.
The candidate lost as project manager and was fired.
The candidate did not participate in the task.

== Episodes ==
=== Week 1: Summer of Sam's Club ===
- Airdate: February 27, 2006
- Prologue: Trump arrived at Republic Airport in New York where George and Carolyn were waiting to introduce him to the new candidates aboard his jet. Back on the tarmac, Trump had each candidate say a few words about him or herself. Upon completion of the candidates' own speech in an Apprentice first, Trump personally chose two candidates (Allie and Tarek) to be project managers for the first task and asked both of them to form the teams.
- Sponsor: Goodyear Tire and Rubber Company
- Hosting Company: Sam's Club
- Task: Teams had to promote a Sam's Club store and sell the most memberships. Teams could also use a Goodyear Blimp for promotional purposes.
- Judges: Donald Trump; Carolyn Kepcher; George H. Ross
- Trump Monologue: Change The Team - People that are successful always know when to pull somebody that makes the team fail.
- Gold Rush project manager: Tarek
- Synergy project manager: Allie
- Winning team: Synergy
  - Reasons for win: Synergy used their blimp to advertise freebies given at Sam's Club over Gold Rush's simple marketing techniques. They sold 43 new memberships.
  - Reward: Lunch at the Penn Club of New York with Donald Trump
- Losing team: Gold Rush
  - Reasons for loss: Summer's attitude was questionable, practically giving up during the task and making only one phone call while she was supposed to make as many as possible, claiming that she could not call the local businesses and restaurants during their dinner rush. She also demonstrated a lack of confidence in her team's ability to win before the boardroom, even though they only lost by 3 memberships. Duffle bags were also misrepresented as gift bags, which had nothing inside them and were given away for free (instead of an exchange for a new membership), as declared by Tarek to Carolyn during the task. They only sold 40 new memberships, only 3 less than Synergy.
- Sent to boardroom: Tarek, Summer, Lenny, Lee.
  - Firing verdict:
    - Tarek came under fire for bringing in Lee and Lenny into the boardroom, for it seemed that Tarek only brought in Lee for personal reasons (after Lee voiced his concerns about Tarek) and Lenny had done what he was told to do, therefore they didn't deserve to be in the boardroom.
    - Tarek claimed that Lenny did not contribute to the task, but Lenny had been in the blimp and utilized his information of the area which George confirmed to Tarek.
    - Summer came under strong criticism by Carolyn in the boardroom after being unable to explain what she contributed to the team, or justify her giving up on her assigned task of calling restaurants after only one attempt; she attempted to deny responsibility for the loss, but George disagreed, pointing out that with the narrow margin of the defeat, Summer might have been able to bring in enough customers to win had she continued making calls. Lenny then came to Summer's defence, saying that she had tried to contribute, but Tarek had ignored and sidelined her, seemingly convincing Trump to give her another chance.
    - Trump noted how Lee and Lenny were laughing at Tarek's bad decisions, especially the fact that he continued to defend the empty gift bags as being a good idea. He also couldn't get Tarek to give any reasonable cause for Lee and Lenny to even be in the final boardroom, vindicating them.
    - Summer suddenly interrupted Trump, which brought the attention back to her. Although Trump openly stated he was "ready to practically fire" Tarek, Summer continued her attempt to defend him, which caused Trump to lose his patience and, given Summer's lack of judgement and little contributions in the task, he decided to fire Summer instead without any hesitation.
- Fired: Summer Zervos – for having a terrible attitude, doing little to help her team throughout the task, her interjections in the boardroom, and at the recommendation of Gold Rush. Despite Tarek's poor performance as project manager, it was deduced that Summer's poor boardroom logic, unsatisfactory performance, and bad attitude made her the obvious choice to be fired.
- Notes:
  - At first, Brent suggested that his team name should be Killer Instinct, but project manager Allie went with Pepi's idea, Synergy. Tarek named his team Gold Rush.
  - After Summer's firing, Trump warned Tarek that he did not make it by much, and was only saved by Summer's interruptions ("She saved your ass"); Lenny responded by saying "Not for long". Trump then said to his advisors that Tarek was "totally overrated".
  - Most of the team actually thought that Tarek didn't deserve to be fired despite not making smart decisions. The team thought Summer should have been fired.
  - Episode One Recap on NBC.com

=== Week 2: The Razor's Edge ===
- Airdate: March 6, 2006
- Sponsor: Gillette Fusion
- Hosting Company: Procter & Gamble
- Task: Teams had to promote the Gillette Fusion razor blade by asking people to text message a key word to their number. The winner would be determined by the largest number of text messages produced.
- Judges: Donald Trump; Bill Rancic; Ivanka Trump
- Trump Monologue: People Are Strange - Life is full of different people. You can never can judge a book by its cover, and you cannot judge someone's appearances to determine if they are winners or losers.
- Gold Rush project manager: Lee
- Synergy project manager: Pepi
  - Dramatic Tension: On Synergy, After Stacy interrupted him several times during a planning conversation for product advertisement, Brent angrily confronted her outside their workspace and Stacy made a big deal out of it after she felt threatened by him. This caused a lot of friction within the team and wasted a great deal of their time. In addition, Pepi could not control the situation and further animosity spread throughout Synergy. It was suggested at one point that Pepi should send Brent back to the suite, but Pepi chose not to and tried to bring him back into the group with mixed success. On Gold Rush, There was an initial split on the team due to Lee wanting to take the time to research and develop a full marketing strategy, while Lenny wanted to get out on the streets early and adapt to the situation as the day went on.
- Winning team: Gold Rush, with 683 text messages.
  - Reasons for win: Lenny chose a great location to get the buzz about the Fusion razor blade and Gold Rush started early, after Lee decided to go with Lenny's plan.
  - Reward: Aiding non-profit organization Career Gear in its mission to motivate men who are disadvantaged, and helping them find and keep jobs that will support them and their families, as well as dressing them in better clothes.
- Losing team: Synergy, with 458 text messages.
  - Reasons for loss: Synergy didn't wake up as early as the other team to get started on the task, and Trump claimed Gold Rush already had received 100 text messages by the time Synergy got out on the street. Gold Rush had scouted their locale beforehand, but Synergy relied on Stacy (a native New Yorker) to pick the location. Although both teams had set up bases in the theater district of Times Square, Gold Rush's area was clearly superior, and the area that Stacy picked was too busy for people to get their attention. Michael's idea of wearing bathrobes to market the Gillette Fusion did not work out as he had planned and was not seen as an appropriate way to represent the product. Most of the messages that they did earn were attracted in a bizarre fashion by Brent, who decided to put on a makeshift display of break-dancing, and the other Synergy members were able to get texts from the crowds of people who showed up to watch the spectacle.
  - Pre-Boardroom: Synergy questioned Brent's mental stability, and they were completely turned off by his social awkwardness and abnormal behavior. Stacy also caused doubt in her teammates after she retracted what she said about the ordeal with Brent, saying that she wasn't threatened by him (although she had said that during the task).
  - Initial Boardroom: Nearly all of Synergy blamed Brent's disruptive behavior on the first day for the loss, with only Brent (who was defending himself) and Roxanne arguing otherwise. Bill called out the team for blaming Brent, adding that Pepi (and the rest of the team to a lesser extent) needed to work on management skills and should have taken action if Brent had been such difficulty during the task. Brent said during the boardroom that he was a "star" on the task because most of the messages that they did earn were attracted by Brent through his break-dancing. His claim was neither confirmed nor disputed by anyone in the boardroom.
- Sent to boardroom: Pepi, Brent, Stacy, and Michael. - Usually, multiple-firings outside the interview portion of the boardroom were unannounced, but since the initial boardroom hearings stated that the team lost because of unsatisfactory teamwork, overall team performance, and losing by almost a 50% margin, Trump told the team that he would fire two people (in an Apprentice first) as punishment for the crushing defeat, and made this very clear after Pepi announced his boardroom choices.
  - Firing verdict:
    - Though there was much debate over exactly what had happened between Stacy and Brent, Trump decided that Stacy's mistakes over the location justified her firing regardless of who was to blame for the confrontation. Bill ultimately concluded debating over the conflict was pointless after Stacy admitted only she and Brent were present.
    - Although Michael made a huge mistake with his idea of wearing the bathrobes during the task and even attempted to dissociate himself from the idea in the boardroom (blaming Pepi for authorizing it), Trump thought Michael had potential and felt he should stay. Trump warned Michael, however, that "if you do it again, you'll be fired so fast your head will spin".
    - While Brent was in jeopardy for confronting Stacy and causing animosity, Trump gave him a second chance because Brent wasn't responsible for the loss, nor was it his responsibility to lead; it was Pepi's. He also warned Brent that he would not last much longer in the competition and most likely be one of the next contestants to be fired, a statement echoed by Ivanka.
- Fired: Stacy Schneider and Pepi Diaz for their inability to manage or work with volatile, difficult people like Brent, plus the following reasons:
  - Stacy Schneider – for choosing a bad location, not taking responsibility for her actions, her exaggerated reaction to Brent's confrontation, and for being disruptive to him. Trump surmised that location is extremely important, and the wrong location proved to be Synergy's fatal mistake. Trump also refused to believe that Stacy, a criminal defense attorney, could be scared of Brent, telling her that "if you can't handle Brent, then you can't handle the business of running one of my companies.”
  - Pepi Diaz – for no leadership ability, not being able to get his team out to a good start, losing the respect of the team after not knowing how to handle Brent and Stacy's conflict, and for wasting a lot of time dealing with that conflict.
- Notes:
  - This is the first time more than one person was fired as Trump announced at least two people will be fired. Stacy was fired first, then Pepi.
  - This is the first time that neither George or Carolyn appear with Donald Trump. Instead, Ivanka Trump fills in for Carolyn Kepcher and Bill Rancic fills in for George H. Ross on this task.
  - Episode Two Recap on NBC.com

=== Week 3: Get It In Gear ===
- Airdate: March 13, 2006
- Prologue: Andrea became so upset when Brent came back from the boardroom that she locked herself in the bathroom and cried hysterically.
- Sponsor: Chevrolet Tahoe
- Hosting Company: General Motors
- Task: Teams had to promote the new 2007 Chevy Tahoe by creating a corporate retreat for the General Motors (GM) executives. The winner would be determined through judgment by the GM executives, rather than by score. The GM executives were judging the teams based on three criteria: interactivity, informational values, and motivational value.
- Judges: Donald Trump; Carolyn Kepcher; Bill Rancic
- Trump Monologue: Plan B - A lot of times the original plan has to change and if you don't have a Plan B it just not going to work. You need flexibility or you will not be successful.
- Gold Rush project manager: Theresa
- Synergy project manager: Andrea
- Winning team: Synergy
  - Reasons for win: Sean had come up with a solid theme for the event with several different physical attractions to complement the retreat. Although Synergy had to scrap their physical attraction of skeet shooting after the park manager forbid the use of firearms, Andrea was able to come up with a golf-cart race as a substitute.
  - Reward: Going to Atlantis Marine World to swim with the sharks
- Losing team: Gold Rush
  - Reasons for loss: Charmaine unintentionally ruined the project after ignorantly hiring a crude comedienne, Cory Kahaney, to entertain the GM executives during lunch. Kahaney's inappropriate jokes offended the executives, ruined the class of the event, and her full fee of $1,700 was still paid without any argument. Although Theresa named Tarek as the team's creative point person, she blocked every suggestion that Tarek made, which meant not getting astroturf for the poorly developed golf course and ignoring Tarek's warning about having a cohesive theme for the event. Instead, Theresa came up with a horse and buggy retreat, which was out of place with the Chevy Tahoe. Theresa also failed to have someone from the team explain the Chevy Tahoe's new features to the executives, leaving it to the unadvised models that Charmaine hired to explain it themselves. Although she appointed Bryce to tell the models about the Chevy Tahoe and its features, this happened only 20 minutes before the event started, giving the models little time to learn the correct information and present the car properly.
- Sent to boardroom: Theresa, Lenny, Tarek
  - Firing Verdict:
    - When Bryce and Theresa went after Lenny in the boardroom being unable to secure an electric generator for this event, their efforts backfired after Trump deduced that simply securing electricity did not cause the team to fail. Bill additionally pointed out that Lenny had still done a huge amount of work setting up the stage, and felt it outweighed this mistake.
    - Bill brought up why Bryce was not brought back for the final boardroom, because Theresa put him in charge for the golf event (along with Tarek) and informing the models about the Chevy Tahoe. Theresa refused to blame Bryce for the models being uninformed, acknowledging that she had left it too late to have him tell the models about the Tahoe and that Charmaine (who hired the models) did not inform them either.
    - It was heavily implied that had Charmaine been brought back into the boardroom, she would have certainly been fired since she ruined the project by hiring an offensive unprofessional comedian Cory Kahaney along with the unadvised models.
    - Trump said that Lenny would've been a better comedian than the one Charmaine paid for which was free.
- Fired: Theresa Boutross – for her weak leadership skills, lack of knowledge and focus of Chevy Tahoe, not coming up with a good theme for its retreat, not having a good reason for bringing Lenny back, and for being essentially responsible for the loss after not bringing in Charmaine (who was ultimately deemed the most responsible for the loss) and Bryce (he was in charge of the golf event with Tarek and informing the models) back to the boardroom.
- Notes:
  - Andrea, as the project manager gave Brent relatively unimportant "busy work" tasks to do so he'd feel like he was contributing and wouldn't bother her during the task.
  - This episode (which was taped October 3–5, 2005) took place during the observance of Rosh Hashanah. In an Apprentice first, two Jewish contestants — Lee Bienstock and Dan Brody – took the task off in observance. George H. Ross, who also observed Rosh Hashanah, was again replaced by Bill Rancic. One contestant, Lenny Veltman, revealed that he too was Jewish, but didn't take the day off, citing that the holiday was not an excuse for them to not do their job. He also mentioned that Israel Defense Forces soldiers stay on duty during the High Holidays and was very critical of Dan and Lee for taking time off. It was also revealed that contestants Brent Buckman and Allie Jablon were also Jewish, but they did not take the task off either.
  - During the task, Bryce and Theresa were infuriated that Lenny did not secure an electrical generator for the event. Despite the fact that it was never disclosed if power was readily available for the team to use in their event, his teammates assumed that Lenny would have learned this beforehand as it was his responsibility to set up the stage. An electric generator was ultimately needed for their presentation of the Chevy Tahoe, and Bryce was able to get one secured at the last minute.
  - Theresa brought back Lenny to the boardroom for his flippant attitude regarding securing the electrical generator for their event, with him claiming "It's not my responsibility." While Trump was unhappy with Lenny, he stated that not securing electricity was not the main reason the team lost.
  - Tarek promised to step it up and Trump replied "you better step it up. If you can."
  - This is the only time in the series that the losing Gold Rush project manager did not choose to bring Lee back into the final boardroom when given the choice.
  - Episode Three Recap on NBC.com

=== Week 4: Cereal Killer ===
- Airdate: March 20, 2006
- Prologue: Charmaine became emotional and regretful after realizing that Theresa had been fired in the previous episode mainly for not bringing her back into the boardroom.
- Hosting Company: Post Cereals
- Task: Teams had to design a billboard ad to promote a new cereal: Post's Grape-Nuts Trail Mix Crunch. Once again, teams would be evaluated by the Post executives, rather than by a score.
- Judges: Donald Trump; George H. Ross; Ivanka Trump
- Trump Monologue: Keep it Simple, Stupid! - In advertising, you want to make the message simple, to the point.
- Gold Rush project manager: Charmaine
- Synergy project manager: Tammy
- Winning team: Gold Rush
  - Reasons for win: Charmaine and Bryce came up with a simple, but effective concept showing a runner pouring a box of Trail Mix Crunch down their throat. In addition, Charmaine's presentation to the Post executives was very concise and professional.
  - Reward: Getting to prepare a meal with the world-famous chef, Jean-Georges at the Trump International Hotel and Tower.
- Losing team: Synergy
  - Reasons for loss: Tammy's concept was too dense, and the advertisement that Andrea made was too cluttered. In addition, their ad had too many different colors, graphics, fonts, and was out of sync with their models. Their slogan was also too long, and they had a terrible slideshow that Sean made, along with a billboard that executives did not believe would be very effective.
  - Pre-boardroom: Several members of Synergy prior to the boardroom had actually concluded that going for Brent in the boardroom would be a waste of time since he had been delegated no major responsibilities throughout the task. Andrea and Tammy planned to call out Brent for continuously underachieving and force him to be a project manager if he survived another boardroom.
- Sent to boardroom: No final boardroom – While it was discussed that Andrea and Sean were directly responsible for the task's failure, Brent stated that Tammy "stank" as a leader and that "it smelled all the way over from here" upon being asked about his opinion on her leadership in the boardroom. Brent's offensive and rude statement drew ire from his team, along with Trump and his advisors for being so crude, his entire team denounced him yet again and gave Trump no reason to let him continue in the process.
  - Firing Verdict:
    - While Tammy came up with the initial concept, her leadership was near-unanimously praised by Ivanka and the other Synergy members. It was concluded that Andrea's advertisement and Sean's presentation were what ultimately cost the team a victory.
    - Roxanne rubbed her roommate Andrea the wrong way in the boardroom by saying Tammy was the best project manager they'd had yet, and when Trump asked if Tammy was better than Andrea, she stated Tammy was indeed better than Andrea, and that she had "sincerity".
    - However, Andrea took it personally and retaliated in the following task, questioning Roxanne and her lack of organization as project manager, which in turn led Roxanne to call out Andrea's rudeness and disruptiveness. This would be the beginning of the Roxanne vs. Andrea conflict that would be used by Roxanne, Allie and Tammy to get Andrea fired in Week 9), in spite of efforts by Sean to stop it from happening.
    - Brent later accused Tammy of saying that he was "too fat" to present but Tammy denied this, stating that she could not let Brent present a healthy brand of cereal when he did not appear healthy himself. Trump regrettably agreed with Tammy's logic, saying that were he launching a health food product, he would likely have Ivanka handle the presentation.
    - Trump strongly implied that had Brent not insulted Tammy, then he would have been spared in the event Tammy brought him back to the boardroom. Ivanka noted that it was Brent's insult to Tammy that opened the floodgates and encouraged the rest of the team to attack him.
- Fired: Brent Buckman – for creating too much hostility with the team throughout the interview process, his aggressive manner and unprofessional behavior in the boardroom where he told Tammy that she "Stank" as PM and "it smelled all the way over from here", being excessively difficult to work with, and for being an extremely disruptive influence and for being universally hated by his team. While Brent was not responsible for the loss in any fashion after being marginalized by his team, Trump ultimately realized that Brent was too big of a negative influence for his team and himself to continue successfully in the interview process.
- Notes:
  - Ivanka Trump again filled in for Carolyn Kepcher in this task. She agreed with Trump's decision to fire Brent and said that it was "absolutely the right decision."
  - In his exit interview, Brent continued to bad-mouth Synergy.
  - Trump commented that Synergy would be a much stronger team moving forward without Brent's negative influence.
  - During the boardroom discussion, Brent claimed that without him, Synergy would have lost all four tasks instead of going 2–2 on them. Ironically, Synergy would go on a 4-week win streak after losing this task.
  - Episode Four Recap on NBC.com

=== Week 5: Cruise Control ===
- Airdate: March 27, 2006
- Prologue: With the exception of Lenny, Gold Rush, who were on much friendlier terms with Brent than Synergy, was hoping for Brent's return from the boardroom, and were visibly shocked and upset when he was fired. Synergy on the other hand, felt a huge sigh of relief when he was fired. Andrea was unhappy that Roxanne told Mr. Trump that Tammy was the best project manager, and subsequently became very critical of Roxanne throughout the task.
- Hosting Company: Norwegian Cruise Lines
- Task: Teams had to create a 30-second commercial to promote the Norwegian Jewel of Norwegian Cruise Lines. Teams also had to be finished filming the scenes of the commercial per the Norwegian Jewel's departure time, which was 3:00pm. Eastern time.
- Judges: Donald Trump; Carolyn Kepcher; Bill Rancic
- Trump Monologue: Listen To Your People - A good leader will always be able to listen to smart people who work for you.
- Gold Rush project manager: Dan
  - Pain of the Task: Dan declared himself the project manager of Gold Rush as soon as the task began, much to the annoyance of Leslie and Bryce, who felt their backgrounds made them better qualified to lead this particular task. He subsequently proved an extremely abrasive leader, yet proved rather indecisive at times and ultimately allowed Tarek to take control of most of the task.
- Synergy project manager: Roxanne
- Winning team: Synergy
  - Reasons for win: Their ad intrigued, but had voice-over unlike Gold Rush, and was clear.
  - Reward: Getting to visit the Brinks vault, and taking home $30,000 worth of diamonds.
- Losing team: Gold Rush
  - Reasons for loss: Although both teams had bold presentations, the executives did not like that Gold Rush used text instead of a voice-over in the commercial, which was Tarek's idea. Also, Gold Rush did not make the connection with the concept they had used, which was built off of Lenny's idea of a castaway that is rescued by the ship, which made the commercial unclear and unappealing.
- Initial Boardroom: Dan and Tarek attacked Leslie and Lee for not stepping up in the task, while Leslie in turn accused Dan of not listening to her advice despite her having worked in the broadcasting industry. Lee rebutted that he had tried to step up, but Dan had shown little interest in listening to anyone but Tarek. Carolyn cut off the fight by saying everyone sounded like they were "ridiculous 10 year olds."
- Sent to boardroom: Dan, Lee, Tarek - After Trump suggested bringing back a third person, Dan considered bringing back Lenny as well, but ultimately decided not out of fear that Lenny would "gang up" on him with Lee.
  - Firing Verdict:
    - Charmaine and Lee wanted Tarek to be fired due to his inability to not listen to his teammates. Leslie wanted Dan to be fired, stating that she will never want to work with him ever again.
    - Trump and Bill considered firing Tarek for not using the voice-over in their commercial (in addition to his past errors in previous tasks), but Carolyn thought that Dan should be eliminated because he chose the concept of their ad.
    - Tarek further harmed his own cause when it was revealed that he told Dan that almost everyone would be against him and he wouldn't advocate for Dan, making it seem like Tarek was not very loyal.
    - During the discussion of why Lee was in the final boardroom, Trump called him a politician given his speech skills. While Trump said he wasn't a fan of politicians, he also said that he doesn't hate them either. Trump also stated that he did not see Lee responsible for the loss and made it clear that he wouldn't be fired.
    - Although it was Lenny's initial premise, Dan did not bring Lenny into the boardroom, therefore taking the burden of Lenny's bad concept; Ultimately, even though this had been Tarek's third appearance in the boardroom, and Trump himself acknowledged that Tarek had done exceptionally awful throughout the interview process, Trump still saw potential in Tarek and ultimately fired Dan for being at helm of the task's failure and failing to bring back Lenny.
- Fired: Dan Brody – for bad leadership, having no ability to control his teammates, allowing Tarek to lead the team over him, being abrasive and indecisive, for bringing Lee in the boardroom for what were seen as personal reasons, and for not bringing Lenny back in otherwise, for he had the idea for their awful commercial.
- Notes:
  - After Dan's firing, Trump requested Lee and Tarek to warn Lenny that he would not last long, strongly implying he would've been fired had he been brought back.
  - Trump mocked Tarek and the requirements to be a member at Mensa, given the excessive number of mistakes that Tarek has made throughout the entire interview process.
  - Episode Five Recap on NBC.com

=== Week 6: King of the Jingle ===
- Airdate: April 3, 2006
- Hosting Company: Arby's
- Task: Teams must create a 30-second jingle for a brand new line of Arby's Chicken Naturals. The teams are given access to recording studios, and professional musicians and the winner would be determined by the executives of Arby's.
- Judges: Donald Trump; Carolyn Kepcher; Bill Rancic
- Trump Monologue: Respect of Employees - You need the respect of your employees. If you can't lead and have your employees' respect, it's over.
- Gold Rush project manager: Bryce
- Synergy project manager: Sean
  - Dramatic Tension: Gold Rush arrived 25 minutes late to their 10:15am meeting with Arby's executives, which they were promptly admonished for getting the team starting on the wrong foot. This was due to Bryce's effort of trying to get the team together where he felt that Leslie, Tarek, and Lenny were arguing at each other and Charmaine told the team to leave in 5-10 mins. In New York City, it is vitally important to allow ample time to approach any important engagement, and it is also very important in business that people are early to a meeting.
- Winning team: Synergy
  - Reasons for win: The executives loved the energy, which fit the whole brand personality of trying to be something different and better.
  - Reward: A chance to sample a very expensive six course truffle meal at the Alain Ducasse at the Essex House, valued at US$4000/lb.—issued from Alba, Italy
- Losing team: Gold Rush
  - Reasons for loss: A key catchphrase was missing in Gold Rush's jingle, which was the fact that Arby's is the only fast-food establishment for Chicken Naturals, as well as giving the executives a bad impression upon their late arrival to the meeting.
- Sent to boardroom: Bryce, Lee, Lenny
  - Firing Verdict:
    - Trump was dubious about Lenny's claims not to be able to speak English well enough to contribute to writing the jingle (due to English being his second language) and warned him that he's on thin ice.
    - Bryce took full responsibility for the loss as project manager and told his team he did not plan to advocate against his own firing.
    - When Bill Rancic brought up the tardiness issue in the boardroom, even Donald Trump was surprised to know that Bill Rancic took an initiative to discuss the tardiness incident with the two Arby's executives.
    - Bringing back Lee and Lenny to the boardroom seemed to be intentional, instead of Charmaine and Tarek as Lee and Lenny were deemed not responsible for the loss, and Charmaine and Tarek were responsible for the Jingle that ultimately caused them to lose.
    - Bryce brought back Lee solely because he had taken the day of the task off to observe a Jewish Holiday (Yom Kippur), a decision which enraged Trump. Trump felt this showed bad and reckless judgement and a total lack of respect for Lee's religion.
    - Bryce continued to defend both Tarek & Charmaine in the boardroom, saying that without Tarek they wouldn't have had any music at all, and without Charmaine, they wouldn't have any lyrics at all. This baffled Trump and his advisors, who felt this point was moot since they failed despite working hard. Realizing that Bryce was trying to engineer his own dismissal, Carolyn told Bryce to "just say fire me Mr. Trump."
- Fired: Bryce Gahagan – for lackluster leadership, contributing little to the task, poor time management, terrible decision making, and for taking full responsibility for the loss after not bringing back both Charmaine and Tarek to the boardroom, as both were primarily responsible for their losing jingle. In addition to bring back Lee and Lenny for unsatisfactory reasons (Lee not participating due to observing a Jewish holiday, Lenny unable to write jingles due to English as his second language), Bryce's argument that nobody deserved to be fired for the loss and his weak defense to stay in the interview process proved to Trump and his advisors that Bryce was too stubborn and immature to be working for the organization.
- Notes:
  - The episode was aired an hour later than its scheduled time.
  - The internal review, a scene which viewers usually watch Trump and his judges discuss the candidates before the final boardroom, was cut from this episode's viewing.
  - This task was filmed around Yom Kippur, and Lee took off one day per the observance. Because George Ross also observed Yom Kippur as well, Bill Rancic filled in again for this task.
  - Charmaine was seen sobbing as she took the elevator back to the candidates' suite.
  - This was the third task this season, and the second consecutive task, that the project manager of Gold Rush was fired for not bringing back the candidates responsible for the defeat, which happened to be both Charmaine and Tarek.
  - This was the second time that a team arrived very late to their meeting. The first time it happened was back in Season 4, Week 8 when Excel arrived more than a half hour late. Unlike Gold Rush where the executives were concerned about where the team has been, the executives in that task (LucasFilm and Best Buy) cancelled the meeting as a result and left Excel on their own.
  - Episode Six Recap on NBC.com

=== Week 7: It's More Than Decor ===
- Airdate: April 10, 2006
- Prologue: Lenny excitedly volunteered to be Project Manager on the following task following his return from the Boardroom after Mr. Trump told him he was on thin ice and was determined to win the next one against Synergy.
- Sponsor: Boys and Girls Clubs of America
- Hosting Company: Ace Hardware
- Task: Teams need to renovate and remodel an old recreational room and transform the space into an interactive recreational room for use in the New Faces for Helpful Places program hosted by both Ace Hardware and Boys and Girls Clubs of America. Sponsors will determine the winner based on three criteria: Creativity, Functionality, and Upgrades.
- Judges: Donald Trump; Carolyn Kepcher; Bill Rancic
- Trump Monologue: Be Decisive - Be decisive and make sure you don't make a mistake. If you are not decisive and not careful, your teammates say he/she doesn't know how to lead.
- Results: Synergy chose "The Lounge" for their theme of the renovated rec room. Gold Rush chose "Music" for theirs.
- Gold Rush project manager: Lenny
- Synergy project manager: Michael
  - Dramatic Tension: On Gold Rush, Lenny chose a theme of Music (Lee talked about Music and the love of it along with dance) and already started planning on what the new rec room will have, but at the same time failed to take any initiative with the task as project manager, dismissing the meeting with executives from his agenda, not saying too much with the executives (other than asking how big is the store they are going to) and letting his teammates talk with them instead. They also spent only 10 minutes in the Q&A session, compared to Synergy spending 45 minutes and grasping a better idea of what the executives wanted. Lenny also chose to not help his teammates (Charmaine, Leslie, & Tarek) with the constructional work, choosing to rather pick up the equipment and supplies with Lee instead, which infuriated them and Lenny was argumentative with Charmaine. Synergy was plagued by Michael's indecisiveness, and the team was irritated after he rambled on with the executives and focused heavily on paint schemes (he apparently had to consult Sean, Allie, and Roxanne merely to choose paint schemes, which made them burst into laughter), rather than actually renovating their room. His meticulous attention to detail further complicated the set-up of their simple display. Sean claims Michael is such a "wanker" and his fury could be seen physically as he was backstabbing Michael. However Synergy got all of the equipment needed for the rec room and materials needed for renovation from Ace Hardware in one night, while on Gold Rush, they got materials from Ace Hardware in one day and all Musical Equipment hours before their presentation.
- Winning team: Synergy, in spite of Michael's leadership. Before the winning team was declared, Andrea and Tammy told Michael he had been a horrible leader and a Synergy win would be in spite of his presence and not because of it. Michael was visibly wounded by this assessment of his abilities.
  - Reasons for win: The team created a recreational space that provided much more variety objects. Their theme of "The Lounge" also promoted teamwork, and tied this into their presentation as an important business-based asset. Michael asked lots of questions with the executives and understand the gist of "New Faces for Helpful Places," despite his team being irritated with him as he rambled with the executives in their meeting.
  - Reward: Allowing an 8-year-old girl, Dasheaira (who is diagnosed with cancer), to engage in a Toys-R-Us shopping spree, courtesy of the Make-A-Wish Foundation.
- Losing team: Gold Rush
  - Reasons for loss: Lenny's presentation of the room was considered poor as Lee had to help him during the presentation. While the children were visibly delighted with the room Gold Rush had made, the executives still stressed there was too many flaws with their room with theme revolving around Music (which was Lee's idea) which was too simple and narrow in scope and if a kid didn't like music, they wouldn't want to go into the room. The environment in the room was noisy and chaotic and did not promote teamwork which was mainly the gist of the program for "New Faces for Helpful Places." The team didn't get the gist of it due to Lenny's inability to take initiative and ask good questions during their meeting with their executives, forcing his entire team to talk with them instead as Lenny already planned on what to do with the room without his need to talk to the executives.
  - Pre-boardroom: After they lost, Lenny said to the team that he will defend his project and himself since he believe he didn't do anything wrong and said the only issue was Charmaine. Lee tried to help Lenny prepare for the boardroom with a cheat sheet written down for him, told what Lenny was being judged on this task, the qualities he can bring to The Trump Organization, and they tried to place the blame on Charmaine, claiming she was hard to work with due to her being too talkative and had a negative attitude.
- Sent to boardroom: No final boardroom – Lenny became extremely defensive when criticized by Bill and Carolyn, while his and Lee's attempts to push the blame onto Charmaine only infuriated the rest of the team. Lenny said that Charmaine was hard to work with and then tried to claim "he was the only one blaming her for the loss" was a conspiracy but was immediately rebuffed. When Trump did ask Lenny who he'd bring to the boardroom, hinting that he should bring back Leslie for her lack of contributions throughout the process, Lenny made a fatal mistake by admitting he would bring back Lee as an advocate (although he was responsible for coming up with the theme for the room, but Lenny approved it) against Charmaine (who was clearly not responsible for the loss). Lee believed in Lenny, but Trump told Lenny what he did wrong on this task and Lenny then became extremely defensive with Trump repeatedly denying his wrongdoings by saying "No I didn't!" to him and interrupting him in the process at least twice. Trump and his advisors declared such a move to be so weak and disloyal (even if Lee didn't think it was) that it gave Trump no choice but to immediately dismiss Lenny as his awful, arrogant actions was the crux of the team's another failure.
- Fired: Lenny Veltman – for making numerous mistakes as Project Manager/Team Leader throughout the task, showing lousy and ineffective leadership throughout the task, being unable to take initiatives and ask questions during the meeting with the executives, being too combative in response to legitimate criticisms, inability to control the team, losing the respect of the majority of the team, poor presentation skills, allowing his teammates to lead over him on several occasions (including Charmaine and Lee), blatantly poor decision making throughout the task, poor behavior in the boardroom including being arrogant and disrespectful to Trump, Bill, Carolyn, and the majority of Gold Rush in the boardroom (especially Charmaine and Tarek), refusing to take responsibility for majority of his actions, and attempting to put all the blame on Charmaine in the Boardroom while wanting to bring back Lee as an ally in the final boardroom rather than bringing him in for coming up with the theme, due to Lenny and Lee's feelings that she had a negative attitude and too talkative. Additionally, Trump felt that Lenny contributed poorly and weakly to the team throughout the interview process after the third week.
- Notes:
  - Despite Lenny's very bad performance as a project manager, Lee still defended him and even went as far to saying he would fire Charmaine simply because he believed in Lenny. Bill and Carolyn were astounded by Lee's poor business logic, but Trump stated (after the boardroom) that he admired Lee for his loyalty.
  - This is the second time this season that a candidate was fired without the need for a final boardroom. As Trump did initially ask Lenny who he would bring back into the boardroom, it was inferred that Lenny's decision to bring in Lee back in as an advocate was what pushed Trump's decision to fire him. Trump declared the move as disloyal (even if Lee didn't see it as so) and seemed annoyed that Lenny would expose Lee in an attempt to save himself, especially when Lee wholly supported Lenny in the boardroom.
  - After Lenny's elimination, Charmaine tried to apologize to Lenny, but Lenny ignored her as well as accusing her of having "10.000 faces", which she denied ever having.
  - Carolyn said Lenny's firing was easy. Bill said it was a no brainer.
  - Lenny's firing mirrored the firing in Season 2, Week 8 when Elizabeth's leadership was too weak. Unlike Elizabeth's firing, Lenny was extremely arrogant and defensive in the boardroom to stay in the interview process.
  - In Lenny's exit interview, he wishes the best of luck for Lee and hope that he wins this "Ultimate Job Interview."
  - Episode Seven Recap on NBC.com

=== Week 8: A Slice of Heaven ===
- Airdate: April 10, 2006 (aired after the 7th Episode)
- Prologue: Lee was visibly distraught when he returned to the suite after Lenny was fired, which disturbed Gold Rush (especially Charmaine, because they felt it was the first time in the competition that he was showing his youth and inexperience) and Synergy (who didn't like Lenny and did not understand why anyone would be unhappy when he was fired). At the task briefing, "usual judges" George and Carolyn will join the candidates later on as Donald Trump met with the candidates alone at the beginning of the task in an Apprentice first.
- Hosting Company: 7-Eleven
- Corporate shuffle: Since Gold Rush now had a two-person deficit, Trump asked a volunteer from Synergy to join Gold Rush and even out the teams. When asked, the entire Synergy team stood silently and looked pointedly at Michael, who ultimately raised his hand and joined Gold Rush.
- Task: Launch a promotion based on 7-Eleven's brand-new pizza sandwich called P'Eatzza, by using a 7-Eleven Store provided by both The Trump Organization and 7-Eleven. The winner will be determined by the amount of increased sales
- Judges: Donald Trump; Carolyn Kepcher; George H. Ross
- Trump Monologue: Know Your Customer - Learn and know your customer, it is a good road to success.
- Gold Rush project manager: Leslie
- Synergy project manager: Andrea
- Winning team: Synergy
  - Reasons for win: Synergy increased sales by 997%. Carolyn didn't like the hats Synergy had, but their marketing flyers and the price of $4 for one slice and $6 for two slices helped Synergy secure a win.
  - Reward: A luxury flight to Washington, D.C. and a stay at a privileged hotel with New York Senator Chuck Schumer
- Losing team: Gold Rush
  - Reasons for loss: At $7.99 for one piece and $8.99 for two pieces, Gold Rush overpriced the product only increasing sales by 608%. Although Carolyn liked their promotional scheme, their price point ultimately cost them a victory. Lee wanted to sell the sandwich at a more reasonable price but Leslie forbade it, even after Lee reported that he overheard some of the 7-Eleven supervisors and managers complaining that the price of the product was abnormally high.
- Sent to boardroom: Leslie and Lee
  - Firing verdict: After being dismissed from the initial boardroom, Charmaine pleaded with Trump to fire Lee, believing that Leslie was a good project manager (albeit the loss) and that Lee let the bad price point hinder his performance in the task. When Leslie and Lee returned to the Boardroom, they got into a lengthy debate about the price point, with Leslie accusing Lee of not standing by the team's decision so he could protect himself from scrutiny. However, Trump and his advisors agreed that Lee's insight was correct and the high price ultimately cost the team a victory.
- Fired: Leslie Bourgeois – for setting the price of the product too high, being an overconfident leader, not fully understanding price points or 7-Eleven's ideal market, being a generally weak contributor throughout the process, and for bringing back Lee alone for personal reasons. Despite Lee's many appearances in the boardroom due to his youth and lack of experience, Trump felt that he had enough evidence that Leslie was the weaker candidate overall.
- Notes:
  - This episode aired at 10:00pm/9:00pm central, right after Episode 7.
  - Indy Racing League driver Tony Kanaan was an official with 7-Eleven, the sponsor of his Andretti Green Racing #11 Honda, and the sponsor of this task.
  - Leslie was fired on her birthday.
  - Andrea admitted that she was a vegetarian throughout this task.
  - Michael admitted that even though Gold Rush lost, he felt more appreciated and respected, than when Synergy won.
  - The P'Eatzza's introduction date of April 18, 2006 at American and Canadian 7-Eleven stores was based on the assumption that this episode was going to air on April 17, and then releasing the product the next day. However, a programming shift moved up the show.
  - As with the sixth week, Trump requested the internal review to be cut from both Yahoo's extended footage and the actual NBC airing.
  - Episode Eight Recap on NBC.com

=== Mid-season highlights ===
- Airdate: April 23, 2006 and April 24, 2006, on CNBC
- This is mainly just a recap of the first eight episodes of this season plus footage that wasn't seen in the first eight episodes
- More backstabbing, more issues brought up by Trump's trusted associates
- As with all Season Highlights from the past, Donald Trump is the narrator
- This is the only episode that can be downloaded without a charge at the iTunes Store
- There's also a preview of what to expect in the final weeks of the "ultimate job interview"
- While Canadians will not be able to see the episode on iTunes (because viewing this indefinitely requires a U.S.-based address and credit card in order to access the episode online) the typical CNBC blackout was removed on the 12:00am ET airing only, due to this episode broadcasting only on this channel.

=== Week 9: Assault on Battery ===
- Airdate: April 24, 2006
- Prologue: Charmaine isn't happy that Leslie was the one fired from the boardroom in the previous week. Upon Lee's return from the boardroom, he lied to the others and stated that Trump wanted him to be project manager the next task. He also jokingly stated that the boardroom seat had his "ass imprinted" on it.
- Sponsor: Ameriquest
- Task: Teams must create a souvenir for a national park in New York City, and then spend the day at Ellis Island selling their souvenirs. Teams are given access to graphics designers from B Squared Design & Print for help in making their souvenirs, and the winner will be determined by the amount of sales made.
- Judges: Donald Trump; Ivanka Trump; Donald Trump Jr.
- Trump Monologue: All In the Family - Many people have priorities, in some cases its family, some cases its business. Have priorities, you can have a great family and do a great job in business and love both of them.
- Gold Rush project manager: Lee
- Synergy project manager: Allie
- Winning team: Gold Rush, with sales standing at $1,548.68. Charmaine was unhappy with Lee's victory, as she felt that he simply got lucky to be the project manager in this task, and that they did not win because of his leadership.
  - Reasons for win: Lee divided the team into two groups (Tarek and Michael took pictures for the brochure while he and Charmaine focused on getting a sponsor for the brochure), which made it easy to get the brochure done. Their brochure design was simple and focused on the history of Ellis Island. The primary reason for the win was being able to secure Battery Park first, which gave Gold Rush an easy win as they sold to people who were waiting for a ferry. Ivanka expressed the view that Tarek appeared to be leading the team and was responsible for the vast majority of the successful brochure.
  - Reward: Play golf with Donald Trump and Vijay Singh.
- Losing team: Synergy, having sales of only $843.40, losing by a margin of 45.5%. Andrea suddenly lost the respect of many people, since before the results were announced.
  - Reasons for loss: The team immediately got off to a bad start after Tammy carelessly left her notes that were needed to make the brochures at the Ellis Island Museum. Synergy ended up getting separated after Allie and Tammy did not find the notes in time to catch the ferry with the rest of the team. Andrea ended up designing a terrible and complicated looking editorial, despite the fact that she specialized in graphic design. Andrea also claimed to be an expert in bulk sales but waited until the last half-hour of the task to tell Allie this, where it would have made bulk selling virtually impossible to accomplish. Synergy also got off to a very late start on the day of selling and could not sell their souvenirs at either Battery Park or Ellis Island after most of the visitors had already obtained souvenirs from Gold Rush.
- Sent to boardroom: No final boardroom – After Allie disavowed Andrea's victories as a project manager, this led to the revelation that Andrea's concentration lay more in business operations as opposed to sales, design, and other clerical skills. Andrea also did not deliver on any of her claims and clearly could not get along with her team. Even though Sean was the only one who defended her, he did so halfheartedly after he placed the blamed on both parties.
  - Firing Verdict:
    - Andrea was called out as the weakest saleswoman by Allie and Roxanne in the boardroom, and Trump's opinion of her clearly changed with this discovery.
    - There was also a dispute over how much Andrea had really sold during the task; while Allie reported that she sold poorly, Andrea claimed to have made many more sales than Allie implied.
    - Sean was torn between the ensuing politics within his team, while the rest of his teammates (who were sick of Andrea and her empty promises) decided to team up against Andrea in the boardroom as she was against Allie for poor leadership and poor sales, vowing there would be "blood on the walls".
    - When Ivanka and Trump laid into Allie for her poor leadership in the boardroom, she insisted that Andrea could not be managed.
- Fired: Andrea Lake – for a lack of business chemistry, failing to execute her specialties, not living up to her claims, and designing a bad brochure. Although Allie did very poorly as project manager for the week by leaving the design team to take matters in their own hands and not fully inspecting them enough, Trump ultimately found Andrea responsible for the loss.
- Notes:
  - This is the first week that NBC invited cell phone users to text their predictions who would be fired for a particular week in this season of The Apprentice. The promotion is similar to Deal or No Deal, which precedes The Apprentice, and its Lucky Case text game, where cell phone users may text guesses for a case with $10,000. In both cases, all correct entries with the $10,000 case (Deal) or the fired candidate (Apprentice) are drawn at random, with one player with the correct answer winning $10,000. An alternate Internet-based voting process (Free) is available due to some states declaring the sweepstakes a "lottery" because of the entry fee.
  - This is the second time that both George and Carolyn were not available to evaluate the candidates; Instead, Donald's children, Donald Trump Jr. and Ivanka Trump will be observing the candidates for this task.
  - This is the second time this season where Synergy lost by almost a 50% margin to Lee as project manager for Gold Rush.
  - This is the third week that Ivanka Trump filled in for Carolyn.
  - Allie, who had a personal tie to Ellis Island after three of her grandparents immigrated there during World War II, decided to step up as the project manager so she could make her family proud.
  - Coincidentally, this boardroom was similar to Brent getting fired in week 4 as the whole team ganged up on Brent, with Andrea aiming for him strongest, whereas in this boardroom Synergy now teamed up (excluding Sean) to fire Andrea.
  - With Andrea's firing, Lee seizes the lead as Project Manager by being the only player still in the game with a 2–0 record as Project Manager.
  - This is the third time someone was fired after winning the previous week as a project manager. (Bradford, Series 2, after waiving Exemption used in Season 2, and Clay, Season 4. Since then in Season 6, Aaron, Aimee and Surya and Heidi, as well as Gene Simmons in Season 7, Tionne Watkins and Natalie Gulbis in Season 8, Selita Ebanks in Season 9, Dee Snider in Season 12 and Johnny Damon in Season 14 also held the distinction after)
  - Gold Rush finally break their month-long losing streak.
  - This is the third time someone got fired without a final boardroom in this season alone.
  - Donald, after firing Andrea, thought that his children did a terrific job, with Ivanka having the honor of playing judge with her brother this time around.
  - Episode Nine Recap on NBC.com

=== Week 10: Blow Out ===
- Airdate: May 1, 2006
- Hosting Company: The Hair Cuttery
- Task: To celebrate a grand opening event of two Hair Cuttery franchise salons in the New York area by executing a sales event. The winning team will be determined by the amount of sales committed on their franchised salon
- Judges: Donald Trump; Carolyn Kepcher; Bill Rancic
- Trump Monologue: Watch Your Back - Everybody is competition, you have the advantage of taking the top spot, don't let anyone take that away from you.
- Gold Rush project manager: Charmaine
- Synergy project manager: Tammy
- Winning team: Synergy
  - Reasons for win: Despite the events of the previous boardroom creating a very bad atmosphere within the team, Tammy was able to pull them together and create an effective marketing plan. Allie in particular did a great job of selling the hair products to customers, with Synergy earning $1,005.47 worth of sales that included $363 worth of hair products.
  - Reward: Write a song at the Steinway Hall with a well-respected musician Burt Bacharach
- Losing team: Gold Rush
  - Reasons for loss: Gold Rush lacked a lot of direction throughout the planning phase during the task, due in part to Charmaine being obsessed with setting up the store to her liking and refusing to let the team do any marketing until the set-up was done. Lee and Tarek were unable to create an effective marketing strategy together, and subsequently put in minimal effort on the actual day of the task, all while Charmaine spent time getting her hair done. Gold Rush only had $700 in sales and were outsold by $305.47.
- Sent to boardroom: No final boardroom – Charmaine and Tarek viciously attacked each other as Trump silently listened on. Their heated argument exposed both Charmaine's very weak leadership during this task and Tarek's inability to be led during this task and in the past. Seeing this and feeling neither Lee or Michael were responsible in any way for the loss, Trump had enough evidence to fire both Charmaine and Tarek without the need for a final boardroom. Trump fired Charmaine and when Charmaine was about to leave the boardroom, Trump told her to sit down since he wasn't finished and told Tarek what he did wrong and the concerns he had throughout the interview process and then fired him as well.
  - Firing Verdict: Tarek said that Charmaine should be fired due to her weak leadership and said her decision making is based on consensus. The remainder of the Gold Rush Team said Tarek should be fired due to being difficult to work with others despite being a good leader, per his teammates.
- Fired: Charmaine Hunt and Tarek Saab. Trump stated he had liked both Charmaine and Tarek and thought they both were intelligent with much in their favor, but felt it was too obvious that they both had to go, since they both made far too many errors to continue in the process, including the following reasons:
  - Charmaine Hunt – for a variety of fatal mistakes as Project Manager/Team Leader through the task including very weak leadership skills, having no effective sales strategy throughout the task, slacking off in the final hours of the task by getting her hair done, and contributing little to the task. In addition to missing the point of upselling the hair products to maximize profits, Trump felt Charmaine lacked the level of emotional strength needed to work for one of Trump's businesses.
  - Tarek Saab – for being excessively hard to work with throughout the process, being impossible to lead, his series of insubordination in the past, and for having an inconsistent track record throughout the interview process. Despite performing well in the last task and being seemingly correct and vocal about choosing a theme for the event on this task, Trump felt that Tarek had performed poorly on many prior tasks and did not believe he would improve in any capacity.
- Notes:
  - This is the second time (in this season) that two people were fired in one week. Charmaine was fired first, then Tarek. Unlike the second task, this firing was unannounced.
  - Neither Charmaine nor Tarek said a single word during their taxi ride, even though Trump predicted they would have another argument in the taxi cab.
  - Similar to the Season 4 double firing of Felisha and Alla, one was fired first, and then as everyone was expecting to return to the suite, Trump holds everyone back and then fires the second person
  - Both Hair Cuttery locations were in Nassau County, Long Island (about half an hour's drive east of Manhattan.) Gold Rush worked at the outlet located at 15 Old Country Road in the village of Carle Place. Synergy's store was at 3574 Long Beach Road in Oceanside.
  - A few days after this episode aired, Charmaine received a franchise offer to run at least one or two franchised salons with the Hair Cuttery name.
  - Episode Ten Recap on NBC.com

=== Week 11: Back to School ===
- Airdate: May 8, 2006
- Prologue: Sean continues to be alienated by Allie and Roxanne despite their victory last week after he lambasted Allie for her awful performance during the Ameriquest task. After Charmaine's and Tarek's firing, Lee is the final person left from the original team Gold Rush out of the final six.
- Sponsor: Outback Steakhouse
- Hosting Company: Rutgers University
- Corporate shuffle: Sean volunteers to transfer to Gold Rush to even out the teams, which tilts the job process back to its inaugural roots of men versus the women.
- Task: Host a tailgate party by selling food served by Outback Steakhouse during a football game using separate tents, lots, and cooks, all of which located at Rutgers University. The winning team will be determined by the amount of sales obtained.
- Judges: Donald Trump; Carolyn Kepcher; George H. Ross
- Trump Monologue: Deliver the Goods - If you don't deliver the goods, talking a good game means nothing.
- Gold Rush project manager: Lee
- Synergy project manager: Roxanne
- Winning team: Synergy
  - Reasons for win: While the all-male Gold Rush secured an exclusive deal with the Rutgers' cheerleaders and had a better marketing strategy from the beginning, the all-female Synergy devised an emergency plan that involved bulk selling and lot delivery to make up for their marketing handicap. This plan paid off for Synergy, who ultimately secured a win after they focused on sales, and not just about attracting people to events. The women also priced all their food for five dollars. Synergy sold $2,750 in food.
  - Reward: To create their very own signature wine at the Rafael Vineyard Estate of Long Island, New York.
- Losing team: Gold Rush
  - Reasons for loss: This was a very surprising defeat for Gold Rush as they had a far better marketing plan and attracted large crowds, but according to Carolyn, Gold Rush made the critical mistake of not actually turning those attendees into sales opportunities. Even Trump was surprised how badly the men lost; their final sales figures came to $1,750, losing by $1,000. The pricing of the food for between two and three dollars was also noted as a significant factor in their loss as well.
- Sent to boardroom: Lee, Sean, Michael—Gold Rush were all under internal review as Trump requested the entire team to wait at the reception area.
  - Firing verdict: Trump considered firing Lee due to being an overconfident project manager, his horrendous track-record at that point of 3–8, and the flawed strategy ultimately being down to him, and George felt the team royally screwed up with having the wrong price point and being overconfident as a whole. Carolyn though thought the biggest issue involved Michael and his attempt to give up on Gold Rush's exclusive deal with the cheerleaders, which she felt showed that he had no competitive edge; when Trump found out he agreed and then angrily fired Michael, while telling Lee and Sean not to feel too great as they did just as poor as Michael, strongly hinting that Lee might've been fired had it not been for Michael's disloyalty despite Lee's PM record of 2–1.
- Fired: Michael Laungani – for being disloyal to the team after attempting to share the cheerleaders with Synergy and for lacking a competitive edge. He also focused too much on the events, but this was due to Lee's strategy. While Lee did not maximize his sales after all the marketing events his team organized, asset-sharing is considered a serious oversight in the business world as well. This flaw in Michael's character was too big of a critical error to be ignored.
- Notes:
  - Sean calls Michael a "wanker" for the third time in the season. The first two times were in the 7th episode.
  - This was the first time that an internal review was shown since the Norwegian Cruise Line task.
  - The use of the correct spelling ("whilst" instead of "while") was noted during the printing of Gold Rush flyers, when Sean used the British spelling. It was noted by Lee and changed to the American version. Michael laughed at Sean for using the British spelling and said "this is not Shakespeare."
  - As a result of this task, Michael joins Andrea as the second undefeated Project Manager to be fired (Michael was 1–0; Andrea, 2–0). Sean and Roxanne were the only candidates left in the competition with spotless records as Project Manager. (Sean was 1–0 at the time, Roxanne 2–0).
  - This is the last time that Carolyn Kepcher assisted Trump on a 'regular task' as his 'eyes and ears' - after this Carolyn appeared in the series 5 finale then left the show entirely. Therefore, it was also the last time that George and Carolyn judged a 'regular task' together.
  - Episode Eleven Recap on NBC.com
  - This is the last episode in which Synergy wins a task.

=== Week 12: Backs Against the Wal-Mart ===
- Airdate: May 15, 2006
- Sponsor: Microsoft
- Hosting Company: Wal-Mart
- Task: Create an interactive and three-dimensional in-store display area at Wal-Mart for customers to demo Microsoft's Xbox 360, a follow-up to the original Xbox. The team that creates the most compelling Xbox 360 promotion will win by an evaluation of both Wal-Mart and Microsoft executives.
- Judges: Donald Trump; Ivanka Trump; Bill Rancic
- Trump Monologue: Death to Traitors - Find the people who are sabotaging your team and get rid of them fast.
- Result: Gold Rush's concept is to outsource the building of the display of the Xbox 360, leaving the duet to focus on merchandise inside the set. Tammy's idea for Synergy revolved around a Hollywood theme, and the team domestically built their own display.
- Gold Rush project manager: Sean
- Synergy project manager: Tammy
  - Dramatic Tension: An employee of the firm that Gold Rush hired to construct the set did not help the team with his delays and broken promises, causing Sean and Lee to face several "crunch-time" moments. On Synergy, Allie and Roxanne did not like Tammy's theme and they were not focusing on the task. Tammy had a discussion with the two in order to get them focused, but Tammy could not control them. When Bill Rancic checked Synergy's progress, Allie meant to roll her eyes in front of him; which it did not look good as Bill brought up that statement.
- Winning team: Gold Rush
  - Reasons for win: Their environment was retail-friendly with price points and a range of different products.
  - Reward: To go to Hollywood to meet Jeffrey Katzenberg, one of DreamWorks' Animation Studios Executives alongside producer Bonnie Arnold, co-directors, Tim Johnson & Karey Kirkpatrick, and conduct voice-overs in the animated film Over the Hedge, the winners will also get their names shown in the film's ending credits.
- Losing team: Synergy
  - Reasons for loss: Synergy did a better job of explaining the main idea of their display and the entertainment value of the Xbox 360. However, the executives disliked the fact that their display looked like a personal lounge and that they did not have any price points or navigation in the display as well, while the other team had more branding system in their display.
- Sent to boardroom: No final boardroom - Due to the amount of mistakes Tammy made on this task as Project Manager/Team Leader along with her mediocre PM record and weak leadership (indicating she is not strong enough to work for The Trump Organization), Trump had enough information to fire her on the spot, indicating that she has made too many errors on this task to continue onwards.
  - Firing Verdict:
    - When being asked how many wins and losses of a project manager, Tammy brought up with her 1–2 record; which didn't make Trump really excited along with her lack of leadership.
    - Trump expressed with his displeasure of Tammy's overall Xbox 360 display by saying that it "stunk", which had mirrored what Brent had said since eight weeks ago and that got him fired.
    - Trump also took note about Tammy's failure in curbing Allie's and Roxanne's insubordination and keeping both of them on-task.
- Fired: Tammy Trenta – for numerous mistakes on this task as Project Manager/Team Leader including her weak leadership throughout the task, a bad overall Xbox 360 design, losing respect of the team, mediocre project manager record of 1–2, and for her inability to control her team including attempting to get Allie and Roxanne to focus and curbing their insubordination. This had also not been the first time Tammy had failed as a project manager.
- Notes:
  - The Internet Movie Database's full credits for the film lists both Gold Rush participants as the voices for BBQ Barry and Lunch Table Larry, respectively.
  - See the Pre-Episode Citation
  - The episode aired one hour later than its normal scheduled time
  - After Tammy was fired, Allie tried to apologize for rolling her eyes but Trump demanded her to exit the boardroom.
  - Episode Twelve Recap on NBC.com

=== Week 13: Who Wears the Pants? ===
- Airdate: May 22, 2006
- Prologue: The revelation that Tammy had been fired in favor of Allie and Roxanne led to the friendship between Allie and Sean (which had already been strained by Allie's previous actions in getting Andrea fired) being irreparably broken. The two mended fences somewhat in the following episode, but Sean still said that he never wanted to work with her again.
- Hosting Company: Embassy Suites Hotels
- Task: Create a new line of uniforms for four different departments for Embassy Suites. Each team has access to design studios, clothing designers, and even models. The employees will determine the winner via a fashion show
- Judges: Donald Trump; Ivanka Trump; Donald Trump Jr.
- Trump Monologue: Work vs. Friendship - covers the differences between friendship and business
- Gold Rush project manager: Lee
- Synergy project manager: Allie
- Winning team: Gold Rush
  - Reasons for win: Gold Rush design their uniforms based on market research and key items that employees wanted to change. A crucial turning point was shown when Lee and Sean collaborated with their designer on fabrics. The uniforms were more comfortable and professional than Synergy's, and the uniforms they made would fit the varying body shapes of the employees better.
  - Reward: An intimate dinner with Ivanka and Donald Jr. at the Aquavit plus advice on how to become Trump's newest apprentice.
- Losing team: Synergy
  - Reasons for loss: Unlike Gold Rush's uniforms, which were more formal and comfortable, Synergy's were more riskier and flamboyant. Synergy uses their love of fashion to execute the task, but Roxanne has some issues with Allie's designs. In addition, Allie offended clothing designer Marc Bouwer during the design phase of the task, with her constant rudeness and calling him "Michael". During the fashion show, Sean and some of the Embassy Suites employees were shocked by the clothes Synergy was offering Embassy's employees and Sean even said he'd feel embarrassed to wear one of Synergy's uniforms, even feeling sorry for the models. This got a much more negative reception from the employees calling them unconformable and weird. Both Ivanka and Donald Jr. declared the loss "a very huge beating" when Ivanka said that 83 out of 120 employees preferred Gold Rush's uniforms over Synergy's 37 out of 120 employees.
  - Sent to boardroom: No final boardroom - Although Allie is primarily responsible for the loss on this task, Trump had enough evidence to fire both Allie and Roxanne due to their friendship interference with each other and was disgusted with both of the women's lack of loyalty to each other once in the boardroom.
    - Firing Verdict: Customer Relations issues were being heard about during the hearing. Ivanka lambasted Allie for being too drastic on the designs. Neither Allie and Roxanne had an idea about differentiating work and friendship on this task.
  - Fired: Both Roxanne Wilson and Allie Jablon - for not differentiating work from friendship throughout the task, and for their exposed disloyalty to each other in the boardroom. While Allie had been more at fault for Synergy's loss (because of her flamboyant designs and being rude to the clients), Trump had to let Roxanne go as well after she clearly let her friendship with Allie interfere with business.
- Notes:
  - Season 5 is tied for the most multi-firings in a single season (along with Season 4).
  - For the 2nd time over the first 5 seasons of The Apprentice, both of the remaining candidates are men, because Trump fired both Roxanne and Allie in the last boardroom session.
  - Donald Trump Jr. and Ivanka Trump once again fill in for George and Carolyn on this task.
  - Synergy has always failed a task when Ivanka filled in for Carolyn. Additionally, each time Lee won as project manager on Gold Rush, Synergy experienced a crushing defeat.
  - As with the previous two multiple-firings in week 2 and week 10, both Roxanne and Allie had to share a single taxi.
  - Unlike the previous two multiple-firings in week 2 and week 10, in which he fired Stacy and Pepi and then Charmaine and Tarek one at a time, respectively, he fired Roxanne and Allie at the same time as he said, "Roxanne, Allie, You're both Fired!".
  - This is the only time all season Gold Rush wins two tasks in a row.
  - Because both Allie and Roxanne were fired on this task, there will be no one-on-one interviews this season. This is the second consecutive season without the need for executive interviews, and also the second consecutive season that a company had been "permanently shut-down" by Trump.
  - Synergy is one of two teams in apprentice history where no one from the opposing team ever moved onto that team. The other is Plan B from season 13.
  - See the Pre-Airing Citation
  - Episode Thirteen Recap on NBC.com

=== The Final Task: The Mother of All Tasks ===
- Starting Airdate: May 29, 2006 (Week 14: Final Task)
- Ending Airdate: June 5, 2006 (Week 15: Season Finale)
- Sponsor: Pontiac
- Prologue: Lee and Sean received a call from Robin to report back to the boardroom immediately after Allie and Roxanne got fired. In the boardroom, Trump announced that both Lee and Sean were the two finalists among over one million applicants for Trump's fifth apprentice. Following the special visit, Lee and Sean were asked to proceed back to the suite, go through all the 16 previously fired candidates, pick 3 candidates and to form a team for this upcoming final task. Unlike the first four seasons, Lee and Sean get to talk to each of the sixteen fired candidates before the next morning, but as with Season 4, Lee and Sean can assemble their teams in the manner they want.
- Judges: Donald Trump; Carolyn Kepcher; George H. Ross
- Gold Rush's Final Task: Host a Pontiac-sponsored celebrity ice hockey game at an assigned place at the Chelsea Piers to benefit the Leary Firefighters Foundation. The ice hockey game must utilize at least one fundraising component, and that fundraising component must be approved by the charity. All net proceeds in the Ice Hockey Game will be remitted to the Leary Firefighters Foundation
  - Gold Rush's Executive Director: Lee
  - Lee's Recruits: Lenny, Pepi, Roxanne
  - Gold Rush Cliffhangers:
    - Lys didn't like the ideas Gold Rush gave for the charity event, and gave Lee a long list of events he was to run in a short amount of time.
    - Carolyn was concerned about Lee's leadership abilities at this point of the job interview. She was also concerned about Lee's selection of employees. Furthermore, Jaime Pressly was lost in one point of the task.
- Synergy's Final Task: Host a Barenaked Ladies concert held at the Trump Taj Mahal at Atlantic City, New Jersey to benefit the World Wildlife Fund. All net proceeds from the Barenaked Ladies concert will be remitted to the World Wildlife Fund
  - Synergy's Executive Director: Sean
  - Sean's Recruits: Tammy, Andrea, Tarek
  - Synergy Cliffhangers:
    - Andrea was forced to leave the task due to bleeding from her paranasal sinuses.
    - The executives of Pontiac were also concerned about the lack of the Pontiac badging during Sean's event.
- Notes:
  - Each executive director has a seed budget of US$5000.
  - For their teams, Sean picked an original Gold Rush member: Tarek, while Lee choose two original Synergy team members: Pepi and Roxanne.
  - Trump and his advisors didn't even remember who Pepi was, and they doubted Lee's choice of him as a recruit. Even Sean doubted Lee choosing Pepi.
  - While both tasks were successful, there were a couple of mistakes as described:
    - Lee chose Lenny and Pepi, who did not seem to be the strongest choices for help in a final task. He also did not give enough direction, and the ones he did give appeared to be too vague.
    - Although Sean appeared to be pulling the team together, George thought that Sean was not supervising his employees closely enough, which bothered him.
- Episode Fourteen Recap on NBC.com

=== Decision Time ===
- Airdate: June 5, 2006 (Week 15: Season Finale)
- The episode aired at a special time, 9:30pm ET/PT, 8:30pm CT/MT
- The Apprentice finale was broadcast live from the legendary Orpheum Theater in downtown Los Angeles (foreshadowing the next season)
- Both Lee and Sean chose the same job, a Trump International Hotel in the trendy SoHo neighborhood of New York City.
  - Sean chose New York because he "needed to learn a lot" from Trump.
  - Lee chose New York because it was close to where he lived.
- Hired: Sean Yazbeck - for having an undefeated PM record of 2-0 (even though Lee had the highest PM record of 3–1), excellent team record of 9–4, and his credentials & career ethics impressed Trump and his advisors. And for not once being called back to the Final Boardroom by other project managers.
  - Coronation reward: A 2006 or 2007 Pontiac G6 Hardtop Convertible
- Fired: Lee Bienstock - For poor leadership in the final task, his excessive appearances in the Final Boardroom, and excessive losses throughout the interview process. Despite having the highest PM record of 3–1, Trump felt Lee's team record of 5–8, and his ultimately sub-par performance across the interview process was not a good fit for The Trump Organization.
- Notes:
  - Although Lee Bienstock was not hired on television (and much to the audiences' and viewers' surprise that Lee heard "You're fired" from Trump), due to his tenacity and credentials, he was hired outside of television by Trump to work for Trump Mortgage as an associate vice president for corporate development approximately three months after Yazbeck was hired inside of television
  - The other job option that Sean and Lee had was to oversee Trump Hotel in Hawaii.
  - This is the first time viewers were able to help Trump decide who should be hired. Trump said that it was "a one-sided decision", and that he didn't agree it should be so one-sided but he agreed with it, ultimately hiring Sean. Therefore, Sean won the national vote.
  - While the finale was aired live (as in previous seasons), this season's finale was held in Hollywood.
  - Lee is the second person to hear Trump's trademark coup de grace in the finale episode, with the first being Jennifer Massey from the second season.
  - When Trump was talking to the previously fired candidates he told Pepi that he does know who he is even though in the previous episode he didn't recognize him.
  - This is the last time Carolyn appeared on the show.
  - Sean denies rumors that he would marry Tammy Trenta
  - Final Episode Recap on NBC.com
