= AKQA =

Digital agency

- Type: Subsidiary
- Founded: 1994; 32 years ago
- Founder: Ajaz Ahmed; James Hilton; Dan Norris-Jones; Matthew Treagus
- Area served: Worldwide
- Key people: Baiju Shah (CEO)
- Services: CRM; E-commerce; Technology services Media, search and analytics (Digital) business transformation and Consulting; Interface design Product development Digital content creation and distribution Social media marketing
- Number of employees: 6000
- Website: akqa.com

AKQA is a full-service digital experience design, development and communications agency owned by WPP. It was founded in London in 1994 and expanded internationally in 2001 through a merger with agencies based in the United States and Singapore. It operated as an independent agency until 2012, when it was acquired by WPP. Initially the firm focused on technology and digital projects, later broadening its focus on design and innovation to services including product and spatial design, and more recently the use of AI. In 2020, WPP announced it was merging Grey Group with AKQA to create the AKQA Group. The resulting agency has around 6,000 employees in 50 countries.

== History ==
AKQA was founded in the United Kingdom in 1994. Ajaz Ahmed launched the firm at age 21 after leaving university before graduating, as he wanted to start a multimedia business quickly while interest in the web was increasing. He was joined by co-founder James Hilton, then shortly after by Matthew Treagus and Dan Norris-Jones in 1995. The agency initially focused on digital projects, including product development. One of AKQA's early clients was Virgin, for which the agency designed the first website capable of broadcasting live radio over the Internet for Virgin Radio. Other initial clients included Microsoft, McDonald's, BMW, and Coca-Cola..

As it grew in the late 1990s, it added capabilities including a consultancy arm, to meet with client demand for Internet strategy consulting. By 1999, it was ranked as the largest independent new media agency in the United Kingdom, and had been valued at £26 million.

In 2001, the company received an investment of $71 million from Accenture and merged with three other agencies to expand internationally. The London-based agency, then known as AKQA New Media, merged with Citron Haligman Bedecarré in San Francisco, Magnet Interactive in Washington, D.C., and The AdInc in Singapore. The merger led to the formation of AKQA as an international marketing agency.

Private equity firm General Atlantic acquired a majority stake in AKQA in early 2007. Media reports valued the deal at approximately $250 million. That year, AKQA was reported to be the largest independent digital agency in the world, with approximately 700 employees and revenues of around $99 million.

The firm was listed as one of AdAge's agencies of the decade in 2009. AdAge noted that AKQA had weathered the bursting of the dot-com bubble, growing its staff and remaining independent. Its growth continued through the recession of 2007 to 2009, as it added around 200 employees and opened offices in Berlin and El Salvador by 2010.

WPP acquired a majority stake in the agency in 2012, buying out General Atlantic and taking part of the shares that had been owned by AKQA's management. The total company valuation based on the deal was $540 million. At the time, there had been a trend of marketing holding companies purchasing digital agencies, and AKQA had been considered the largest digital agency that was still independent. AKQA became an autonomous subsidiary of WPP, with Ahmed as its CEO and Bedecarré as chairman. According to the Financial Times, by the time of WPP's acquisition, AKQA had been named "agency of the year" 19 times, and it had received five Cannes Lions awards within the previous year.

The firm received the Queen's Awards for Enterprise in 2014, in the "Innovation" category for "consistent contribution and outstanding achievement".

In November 2014, James Hilton stepped down as Chief Creative Officer of AKQA after creatively leading the company for 20 years.

The following year, the agency won four gold Cannes Lions and had received the most awards of any other UK digital agency at Cannes Lions International Festival of Creativity 2015.

In November 2020, WPP consolidated its agency portfolio by merging Grey Group with AKQA, forming AKQA Group while retaining the AKQA and Grey brands as distinct entities. The combined businesses employed approximately 6,000 people across 50 countries and had collectively received around 600 Cannes Lions awards since 2010.

In October 2024, Ajaz Ahmed stepped down as Chief Executive Officer of AKQA Group, 30 years after founding the company. The following year, WPP announced that Grey would separate from AKQA and realign under the Ogilvy Group, ending the five-year integration while retaining the Grey brand.

Baiju Shah, formerly Chief Strategy Officer at Accenture Song, was appointed Chief Executive Officer in July 2025.

== Operations ==
The agency is majority owned by WPP and operates as an autonomous subsidiary. The agency's services include experience design, as well as product and spatial design. The company is known for its focus on technology and innovation, including web and mobile app development, e-commerce and interactive campaigns.

As of 2020, prior to the merger with Grey Group, AKQA had approximately 2,000 employees globally, in around 30 studios. The agency's locations included studios in: Europe in Denmark, France, Germany, Italy, the Netherlands, Sweden, and the United Kingdom; in the US, Brazil and El Salvador; in Asia in China, India, Japan, and Singapore; in Australia and New Zealand; and in Africa and the Middle East in Egypt, the UAE and South Africa.

== Major work ==
In 2005, the agency designed the user interface for the Xbox 360, creating a dashboard and guide for users to navigate the gaming and entertainment functions of the console. This was the first video game console project that AKQA had worked on, and marked the first time an agency was involved in development of a major gaming console. A team at AKQA developed the interface design and worked with focus groups in different countries to test prototypes. The project launched AKQA's interface design practice.

As an interactive project for Coca-Cola, the agency developed an animated website creating an online version of Coke's "Happiness Factory" from its TV advertisement campaign. The site was called "Now Hiring" and led visitors through a virtual application to become a pretend employee at the Happiness Factory and learn about the characters from the advertisements. The site was animated and represented the imagined world inside of a Coke vending machine. As the site was intended to be accessible to visitors from different countries, AKQA created a new language for the Happiness Factory that was then translated using subtitles for the respective language for each of the 40 different markets where it was available.

In 2011, it developed an updated version of the iPhone fitness app for Nike, the Nike Training Club app. The agency undertook research into the app's target audience and then developed a new app design and interface. The app was marketed towards women, as a "personal trainer in your pocket", providing guided workouts and functionality to sync the user's own music from their iTunes library. Within the month of its launch, the app was the top free health and fitness app in the iTunes store by number of downloads. According to Nike, by December 2011, the number of downloads exceeded 2.8 million.

Also for Nike, the agency worked to create an interactive LED basketball court for the company's Nike Rise campaign, promoting the brand in China. The court was named "House of Mamba" based on the nickname for Kobe Bryant, and was built from LED screens with a protective glass layer and a coating to make the court grip and feel like a standard basketball court. Motion sensors were used to make the court interactive, so that different patterns and colors would indicate a player's movements. The Nike Rise campaign held a competition for young Chinese basketball players to train with Bryant, which culminated in 30 chosen players training with him on the interactive court. As of 2016, the project had received the most awards of any of AKQA's work to date, including three Cannes Gold Lions awards in 2015.

In 2015, the agency developed an interactive experience for Usher's Chains music video titled "Don't Look Away". AKQA worked with music streaming platform Tidal to make the video with facial recognition software that used the viewer's webcam to track whether they are looking at the screen. The video's theme is racial injustice, and showed images of unarmed victims of racially motivated killings or police brutality overlaid with captions about the events; if the viewer looked away the music would stop and the words "Don't look away" would appear on screen.

For BBC Earth, AKQA created The Story of Life app in celebration of naturalist David Attenborough's 90th birthday in 2016. The app included approximately 1,000 video clips from his nature documentaries and represented the largest digitally-released collection of his documentary work. The app included a tool for users to make their own documentaries using the clips.

In 2019, the agency won the Cannes Lions Media Grand Prix for their Air Max Graffiti Stores campaign for Nike in São Paulo. The company worked with graffiti artists in the city to add Air Max shoes to graffiti characters to showcase the street art as part of the city's culture and promote the shoes. Visitors to the murals could then buy the shoes, using geolocation technology. The campaign was prompted by an effort by the city's governor to remove graffiti from the streets; the governor was later convicted for damage to the city's culture.

Also that year, the firm used AI to develop a new sport called Speedgate as a project for Portland Design Week. The company entered data for around 400 sports into a neural network, then worked through a process of reviewing and refining results to create a feasible new sport option.

In 2021, AKQA won a Cannes Lions Grand Prix and a Fast Company "World Changing Idea" award for its design of "Looop" for H&M, an installation of a fabric recycling machine at a H&M store in Stockholm that customers could use create new items from old garments.
