= Ajaz Ahmed =

British Businessman

Ajaz Ahmed MBE
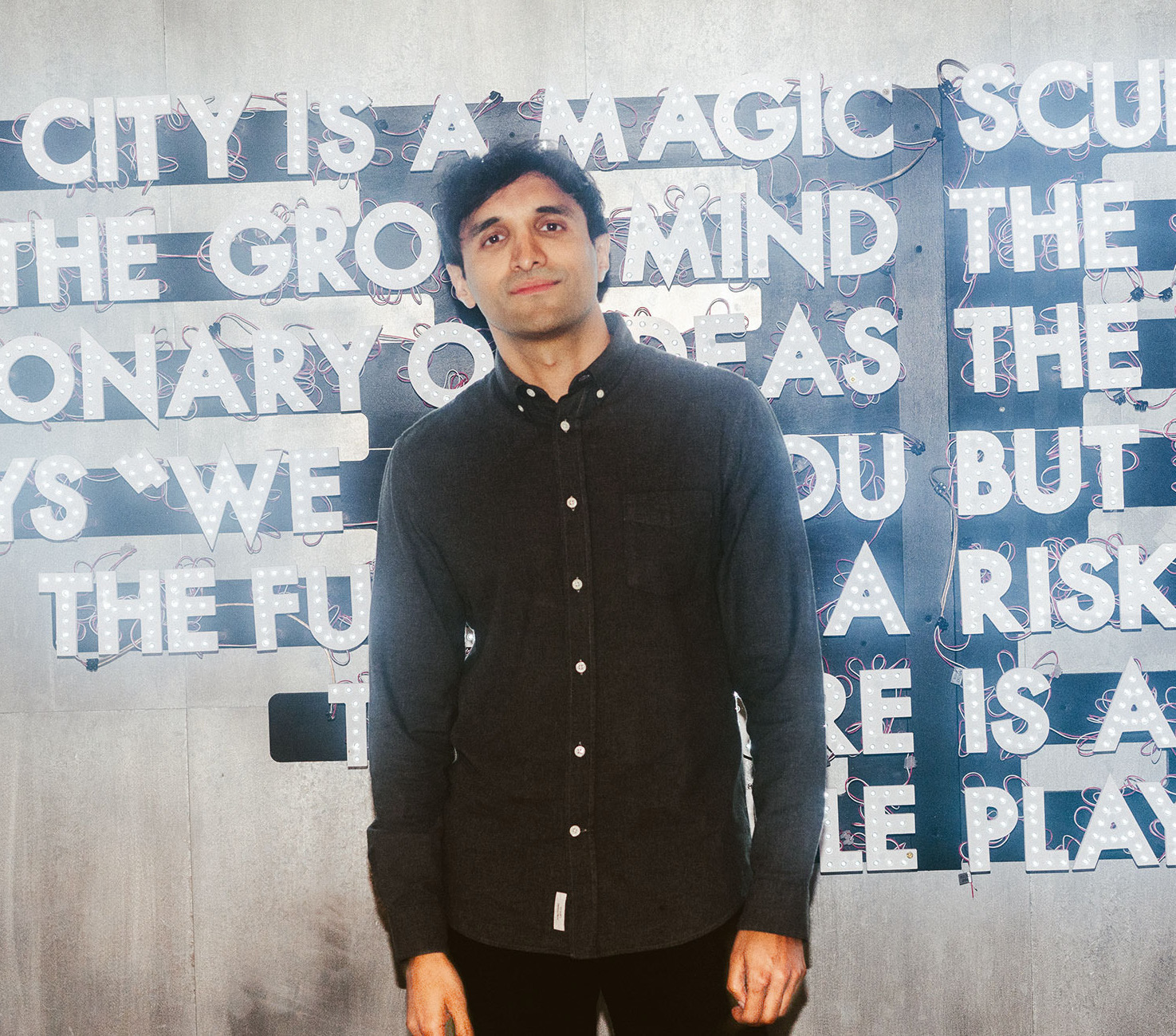
- Ahmed in 2015
- Born: Ajaz Khowaj Quoram Ahmed; 1973 (age 52–53); Taplow, Buckinghamshire, UK
- Occupation: CEO
- Years active: 1994–present
- Board member of: AKQA (1994–2024); Elton John AIDS Foundation; Virgin Unite; Mental Health Innovations; Prism The Gift Fund
- Parents: Khowaj Ahmed (father); Sughran Ahmed (mother)
- Website: ajaz.org

Ajaz Khowaj Quoram Ahmed, MBE (born 1973) is a British entrepreneur. He is best known as the founder of London-based new media company AKQA.

== Early life ==
Ahmed was born in Taplow, Buckinghamshire in 1973 to parents from Punjab, India. He grew up in Maidenhead, where his father, Khowaj Ahmed, worked at a Beechams factory, and his mother, Sughran Ahmed, worked at a hospital launderette.

While in school, Ahmed was a paperboy and delivered newspapers to the UK headquarters of what was then the world's third-largest software company, Ashton-Tate. He wrote to the company requesting a job, and at 15, received an offer to work there during school holidays. From 1989 to 1991, Ahmed served in the marketing department and eventually as a programmer. He used the company's dBASE software to author an improved financial system for purchase orders.

== Career ==
In addition to working for Ashton-Tate as a teen, Ahmed worked for video game developer Ocean Software. He left school in 1992, and for the next year, he was a marketing and public relations employee for Apple UK. He turned down a copywriting position at BBDO and a brand management position at Unilever to begin a business studies degree at the University of Bath.

=== AKQA 1994-2024 ===
In 1994, Ahmed decided to leave university and launch a multimedia agency. There was a high level of interest in the World Wide Web at the time, and he felt that it was crucial to start a company right away. He first undertook a "fact-finding" trip to the U.S. to find out how companies were using the Internet. Following this, at the age of 21, he founded AKQA, named after his initials.

Ahmed led the company as its CEO and public face, and by 1999, it was ranked as the largest independent new media agency in the UK. The company received an investment of $71 million from Accenture in 2001, and merged with three agencies in San Francisco, Washington, D.C., and Singapore, establishing itself as an international agency. WPP acquired a majority stake in the agency in 2012, with the deal valuing AKQA at $540 million. AKQA became an autonomous subsidiary of WPP. In November 2020, WPP announced that Grey Group would merge with AKQA to form AKQA Group. Thirty years after founding AKQA, Ajaz Ahmed resigned as CEO of AKQA Group on 17 Oct 2024.

=== Studio.One 2025- ===
On 1 May 2025, Ahmed launched a new marketing agency, Studio.One.

== Personal life ==
Ahmed was appointed Member of the Most Excellent Order of the British Empire (MBE) in the 2018 Birthday Honours for services to Media. Later that same year, he was awarded an honorary degree as Doctor of Business Administration from the University of Bath.

Ahmed has authored three books, as of 2021: Velocity (2012), Limitless (2015), and Defeat (2019). Velocity was co-authored by Nike's former vice president of digital sport Stefan Olander, and discusses how companies should embrace the digital world. The book was a UK bestseller in non-fiction. Ahmed has stepped down as CEO at AKQA and now serves on the board of trustees for non-profit organizations including the Elton John AIDS Foundation, Virgin Unite, and The Royal Foundation's Mental Health Innovations.

== Bibliography ==
- Ahmed, Ajaz (5 May 2012). Velocity : The Seven New Laws for a World Gone Digital. London: Random House UK. ISBN 9781448116898.
- Ahmed, Ajaz (1 October 2015). Limitless: Leadership that Endures. London: Random House UK. ISBN 978-0091947569.
- Ahmed, Ajaz; Watson, Christian (1 January 2019). Defeat. Ajaz Ahmed & Christian Watson.

== See also ==
- AKQA
