= Morten Villiers Warren =

British/Dutch industrial designer (born 1967)

- Education: Kingston University
- Occupations: Designer, Industrial
- Known for: Founder of Native Design in London & San Francisco

Morten Villiers Warren (born 1967) is a British industrial designer. Warren founded Native Design, a design and innovation company, in 1998 and remains the principal creative and CEO.

== Education ==
Warren attended Kingston University (1985–1988) completing a BA in Furniture Design.

Warren is a member of the IDSA and has countless patents to his name. He spoke and represented the British Council at numerous design conferences, including Beijing China, Essen Germany, Mumbai India and São Paulo Brazil.

== Career ==
Prior to founding Native, Warren was a principal designer at Bowers & Wilkins between 1989 and 1992. He was responsible for the loudspeaker brand Solid. He has worked for Philippe Starck as well as Aldo Cibic in Milan.

At Native, Warren oversees product and user experience for a range of sectors, including medical, automotive, FMCG (fast-moving consumer goods), and consumer electronics. Native's clients include Anheuser-Busch InBev, Audi, Bang & Olufsen, Baxter International, BBC, Bentley, Bowers & Wilkins, Canal+, Coloplast, Diageo, Here, Hewlett-Packard, Illumina, Microsoft, Nespresso, Novo Nordisk, Pernod Ricard, SFR, Skype, Banco Santander, and Veon.

In October 2018 Warren helped found Zuma Array Ltd. In May 2021 their first product, the Zuma Lumisonic, was announced.
