= Native Design =

British design company

Native Design Ltd.
- Type: Independent
- Founded: September 1997 in London, England
- Headquarters: London and San Francisco
- Area served: Worldwide
- Key people: Morten Villiers Warren, Founder and CEO; Marcus Hoggarth, President and CCO
- Services: Strategy; User experience Digital and Physical Product design Interaction design Service design Industrial design Engineering; Technology services Business Transformation and Consulting; Product development
- Website: https://native.com/

Native Design is a London-based independent design and innovation consultancy, with teams in the UK and USA, founded in 1997. Specialising in strategy, industrial design, digital product design, AI-driven innovation and engineering, Native has delivered award-winning work across consumer electronics, automotive, telecommunications, life sciences and healthcare.

== History and work ==
Native Design was founded in 1997 by former Manager of Design at Bowers & Wilkins, Morten Villiers Warren. Morten designed the "Emphasis Speakers" on the cover of Art of Noise's Below the Waste album.

After the success of their early work, the company developed a long-standing relationship and collaboration with Bowers & Wilkins, designing earphones the Zeppelin iPod dock and loudspeaker and the PM1 loudspeaker.

Working with the HP Design Team in 2014, Native created the Sprout, a touch screen computer with both vertical and horizontal screens.

In 2015, HP's CEO Meg Whitman called for a unification across HP's GBUs and thus kick-started concept visioning with Native.

In 2015, Native was commissioned to create the new user experience (UX) and homepage for the BBC.

Coloplast employed Native to create the "Design DNA" in 2016, which won a Gold Lion at the Cannes Lions Festival of Creativity. Subsequently, Forbes named the company as one of the "Top 25 Most Innovative Companies of 2016".

In 2018, Native was honoured with the International Design Excellence Gold Award for its work with the Ford Motor Company on the creation of their future car experience known as the Autonomous Vehicle Simulator (AVS). AVS is a demonstration platform.

Native announced the founding of Zuma in 2018; launching Lumisonic a fully integrated wireless multi-room lighting and audio ecosystem, taking full end-to-end responsibility from concept through to market launch as both design authority and systems engineering lead. The system combined a bespoke ultra-compact loudspeaker integrated into an LED ceiling fixture with an ARM-based quad-core processor, custom wireless infrastructure delivering synchronisation accuracy of 100 microseconds, and a patented detachable bezel enabling voice control and home automation. The programme resulted in 22 patents, several of which have since been licensed globally. The Times described Zuma as "one of the most ingenious developments in home tech".

Native partnered with Illumina to design and develop the NextSeq 1000 & 2000, NovaSeq X, and MiSeq i100 genomic sequencers across physical and digital experience. The NextSeq instruments incorporated over 75 patented innovations and were recognised with multiple awards, including from IDSA and Red Dot Design in 2021.

In 2023, Native was approached by iFIT to design and develop the NordicTrack Ultra 1, a high-end treadmill launched to critical acclaim. Forbes described it as "the Ferrari of treadmills", and Time magazine named it a Best Invention of 2025.

== Awards and recognition ==
The company was the first British design company to win both Gold and Best in Show at the IDSA International Design Excellence Awards (IDEA).

A selection of Native’s collection of over 170 international design and innovation awards:

- Gold at the IDSA International Design Excellence Awards for the Definitive Autonomous Car Experience for Ford Motor Company
- Gold at the IDSA International Design Excellence Awards for the Zeppelin iPod dock and loudspeaker for Bowers & Wilkins.
- Gold and Best in Show at the IDSA International Design Excellence Awards for the Design DNA for healthcare company Coloplast.
- Gold at the Cannes Festival of Creativity for the Design DNA for Coloplast.
- 5 Red Dot Awards for the HP PHI Design Language Strategy.
- Red Dot for the Illumina NextSeq 1000/2000.
- Red Dot Best of the Best for HP Pavilion and ENVY All-in-One desktops.
- iF Design Award for Zuma Lumisonic.
- iF Design Award for Boehringer Ingelheim Diabetes management platform.
- Time Magazine Best Invention of 2025 for NordicTrack Ultra 1.
