= Roxanne Wilson =

American lawyer

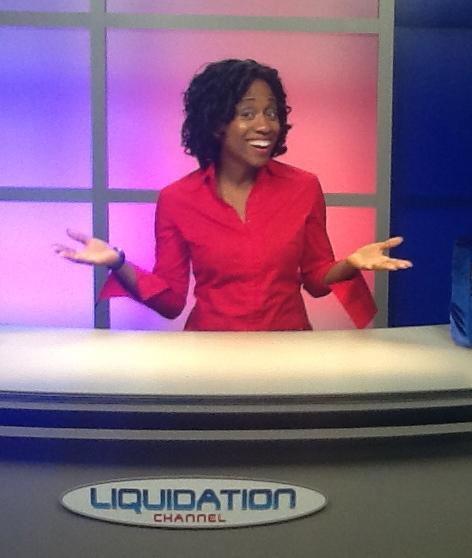
- Roxanne Wilson Hosting on The Liquidation Channel, in 2012
- Born: March 17, 1979 (age 47); Ames, Iowa, U.S.
- Education: University of Michigan
- Occupations: Radio personality, Jazzercise Franchisee, Instructor, Public Speaker
- Website: RoxanneWilson.com

Roxanne Tessa Lisa Wilson (born March 17, 1979) started her career as an appellate attorney in Austin, Texas. She is currently a public speaker and Jazzercise franchisee. She was television host for The Liquidation Channel and a contestant on the hit NBC reality TV show The Apprentice 5 with Donald Trump. She was fired in week 14 as the first African American woman to make the final four.

== Early life ==
Roxanne was born in Ames, Iowa, as the middle of three girls and the first American-born in her family. Her family is originally from Trinidad and Tobago. She earned a business degree in economics from Baylor University while also being a member of the Baylor University Chamber of Commerce; the oldest organization and all-male fraternity which accepted Roxanne as the first female. She has clerked for two justices on the Supreme Court of Texas. She earned her J.D. degree from the University of Michigan.

== Professional career ==
Roxanne Wilson worked for a premiere Texas law firm and clerked for two justices on the Supreme Court of Texas after law school. She was a host on The Liquidation Channel, a blogger, social media enthusiast, Jazzercise instructor, author, and well-traveled speaker. Roxanne hosts webisodes around Austin, "On The Road With Roxanne."

Roxanne became a Jazzercise Franchisee in 2001 and owns and operates Jazzercise Riata in Austin, Texas where she teaches weekly.

== Broadcasting ==
Roxanne was a contestant in season five of NBC's The Apprentice with Donald Trump, being the first African-American woman to compete in the final four on the NBC hit show.

Roxanne co-hosted Texas' Christian talent search program, Inspire the Desire.

She co-hosted Family Friendly Mornings on Austin's Contemporary Christian station, 105.9 The River for two years.

Roxanne joined the Liquidation Channel in 2010. Within eighteen months Roxanne moved from 'night owl' to prime time host on the twenty-four hour international home shopping network. In 2012 Roxanne debuted the Liquidation Channel's hit specialty show "Creature Couture," featuring animal jewelry and lifestyle products.

== Publications ==
With The Apprentice TV show as the background, Roxanne's book Footprints in the Boardroom explains how modern believers can use their faith to overcome modern day challenges, especially in a dog-eat-dog business world.

== Humanitarian interests ==
Roxanne is a member of the Junior League of Austin and serves as mentor to the high school girls at her church, Riverbend. Roxanne served as spokesperson for the Make-A-Wish Foundation Destination Joy campaign presented by Lay's and on the Susan G. Komen Breast Cancer Foundation Austin Board of Directors, and teamed up with Scott & White and Entercom Austin to promote Balance Austin, a program dedicated to educating women on the importance of life balance.

== Personal life ==
Roxanne resides in Austin, Texas with her Yorkie, Bear.
