= Voices for America's Children =

- Founded: 1984
- Dissolved: June 2013
- Type: Child Advocacy
- Location: Washington, D.C.
- Region served: United States
- Members: 60
- Key people: Tamara Copeland, president (1996 - 2006) William Bentley, CEO (since 2007) Deborah Stein, federal policy director Joe Theissen, vice president
- Revenue: $2,723,275 (in 2009)
- Website: http://www.voices.org
- Formerly known as the National Association of Child Advocates (renamed in 2003)

Voices for America's Children (Voices) was a 501(c)(3) non-profit organization located in Washington, DC. Voices was a U.S. nonpartisan, national organization that advocated for the well-being of children at the federal, state and local levels of government. It addressed areas such as early childhood education, health, juvenile justice, child welfare, tax and budget decisions. It was known as National Association of Child Advocates prior to 2003.

Voices for America's Children officially closed its doors in June 2013, although groups of former members continue their work at the state and local level.

== History ==
Voices for America's Children began when child advocates from the US met for the first time in 1981 and formed the National Association of State-based Child Advocacy Organization (ACA) in 1984. In 2003, ACA changed its name to Voices for America's Children.

In 1996 the National Association of Child Advocates established its annual Florette Angel Memorial Child Advocacy Award in memory of Florette Angel and her efforts to improve the lives of West Virginia children.

In 2004, the organization prepared and published a report named “Early Learning Left Out: An Examination of Public Investments in Education and Development by Child Age". The report was based on a comprehensive analysis of public investments in education and child development. It covered three age groups - early years (0-5), school age (6-18) and college age (19-23) - across 12 states. The report was updated the following year and then again in 2010.

Voices for America's Children received two grants from Atlantic Philanthropies, a $1.8 million grant in 2006 and a $3 million three-year-grant in 2008.

In 2011, after reviewing ten Republican candidates' debates and campaign websites, Voices found that only 2.2% of the debates referenced children-related issues.

In 2012 Voices sent letters to Democratic candidate President Barack Obama and Republican presidential candidate Mitt Romney urging them to clarify their stance on child and family issues and to formally seek the advice of child advocates.

In 2013 Voices was dissolved after a vote by the board of trustees. In September of the same year President Obama appointed William Bentley, former CEO of Voices, to head Family and Youth Services Bureau.

== Members ==
Voices had 62 member organizations in 46 states of the US, as well as in The US Virgin Islands and the District of Columbia (DC).. A member was defined as an organization that belonged to the Voices network and was a nonprofit organization that is either: a provider coalition with an advocacy component to its overall agenda; or the state or community affiliate of a national single-issue child advocacy organization; or a state or community-based organization focused primarily on public awareness, resource or referral or direct services, with child advocacy as part of its mission; or a KIDS COUNT grantee without child advocacy as any component of its agenda.

== Funding ==
Financial backing is provided by membership fees and grants from the following foundations:

- The Annie E. Casey Foundation
- The Atlantic Philanthropies
- The David and Lucile Packard Foundation
- The John S. and James L. Knight Foundation
- The William Penn Foundation
- The Pew Charitable Trusts
