= Digital product design =

Iterative design process used to solve functional problems with formal solutions

Digital product design is an iterative design process used to solve a functional problem with a formal solution. A digital product designer identifies an existing problem, offers the best possible solution, and launches it to a market that demonstrates demand for the particular solution. The field is considered a subset of product design. Some digital products have both digital and physical components (such as Nike+ and Fitbit), but the term is mainly used for products produced through software engineering. Since digital product design has become mainstream in the creative industry, a digital product designer oftentimes is simply referred to as a "product designer" in job posts.

== Career Path ==
Digital product design is a transdisciplinary field because a digital product designer sees the project from end-to-end; from recognizing an opportunity and understanding the customer's need through to final delivery. A digital product designer is an integral part of the creative team at every stage of the process who leads the UI, and UX design throughout, and is also involved in the product strategy with an entrepreneurial mindset to help get it to the market. Although computer programming is not a required skill for a digital product designer, digital product designers need to have a high-level understanding of how all of the technical pieces work together in order to ensure, that the creative vision is fully realized. Although part of a digital product designer's job is to oversee the look and feel of the product as well as the development of the software system, digital product design is a different creative process and career path from graphic design and web design.

== Academic Degree ==
Digital product design is an interdisciplinary field of study that combines aspects of computer technology, industrial design, entrepreneurship, marketing, and humanities. Degree programmes in digital product design have been developed to provide cross-disciplinary education spanning these fields, with an emphasis on applying knowledge and methods from different disciplines to the development of digital products.

Digital Product Design is part of the Advertising & Digital Design BFA program at Fashion Institute of Technology.

Digital Product Design is taught at Rhode Island School of Design.

Digital Product Design is a concentration in Communication Design MPS program at Parsons.

Digital Product Design is a certificate program at Pratt institute.

== See also ==
- Phaidon Design Classics
