= The Great Game: Afghanistan =

- Written by: Various
- Subject: History of Afghanistan
- Setting: Afghanistan, 1842 to present

Premiere
- Date: 17 April 2009
- Place: London

The Great Game: Afghanistan is a British series of short plays on the history of Afghanistan and foreign intervention there, from the First Anglo-Afghan War to the present day. It is organised into three sets of four plays and draws its name from the 19th and 20th century Great Game, a geopolitical struggle for dominance between The British and Russian Empires. The main plays are linked by monologues and duologues giving historical background and verbatim theatre edited by Richard Norton-Taylor from modern figures linked with western involvement in Afghanistan, such as William Dalrymple, Hillary Clinton, Stanley McChrystal and David Richards.

Premiering at the Tricycle Theatre in London in 2009, it had another 6-week run there before a tour of the US. The cast included Michael Cochrane and Jemma Redgrave and the directors were Nicolas Kent and Indhu Rubasingham. It was noted for the significant interest shown in the production by the Pentagon, as an educational tool for US soldiers and officials involved in the war in Afghanistan.

== Plays ==
=== Invasions and Independence ===
This part covers the period from 1842 to 1929.

1. Bugles at the Gates of Jalalabad by Stephen Jeffreys – Four buglers outside Jalalabad keep watch for survivors from the Massacre of Elphinstone's Army, while Lady Florentia Sale reads her diary.
2. Durand’s Line by Ron Hutchinson – Amir Abdul Rahman and Sir Mortimer Durand discuss the eponymous Durand Line after the Second Anglo-Afghan War.
3. Campaign by Amit Gupta – A British civil servant in the new UK coalition government tries to draw on the history of Mahmud Tarzi to produce a British withdrawal strategy in 2010.
4. Now is the Time by Joy Wilkinson – Amānullāh Khān, his wife Soraya Tarzi and her father Mahmud Tarzi are stuck in a car stuck in the snow in their escape from Kabul in 1929.

=== Communism, the Mujahideen and the Taliban ===
This part covers the period from 1981 to 2001.

1. Black Tulips by David Edgar – Groups of Russian conscripts from 1987 back to 1981 are briefed for their role in the Soviet–Afghan War
2. Wood for the Fire by Lee Blessing – Two CIA operatives deal differently with the growing power of Pakistan's Inter-Services Intelligence to supply the Mujahideen for their war on the Soviets. (The original play in this slot in 2009 was JT Rogers' Blood and Gifts on a similar topic, but this was left out of the 2010 run, since it had been expanded into a full-length play in the meantime to be produced at the Royal National Theatre in October 2010.)
3. Miniskirts of Kabul by David Greig – A Western journalist imagines a meeting with president Mohammad Najibullah as the Taliban closes in on his refuge in the UN compound in Kabul in 1996.
4. The Lion of Kabul by Colin Teevan – Two men have killed UN aid workers and the Taliban throw them to Marjan, the one-eyed lion in Kabul Zoo, with the UN's unwilling collusion.

=== Enduring Freedom ===
Named after Operation Enduring Freedom, it covers the period from 2001 to 2009.

1. Honey by Ben Ockrent – A CIA man tries and fails to persuade Ahmad Shah Massoud to help resume American intervention in Afghanistan, just before Massoud's assassination in 2001.
2. The Night is Darkest Before Dawn by Abi Morgan – An Afghan widow attempts to re-open her husband's school in the wake of the September 11 attacks and American intervention.
3. On the Side of the Angels by Richard Bean – An aid worker gets involved in Afghan women's rights against her will, when two young girls are betrothed to older men to resolve a land rights dispute.
4. Canopy of Stars by Simon Stephens – Two British soldiers guarding the Kajaki Dam discuss military life and the justification for intervention.

== Production history ==
- Tricycle Theatre, London – 17 April to 14 June 2009
- Tricycle Theatre, London – 23 July to 30 August 2010
- US Tour – 15 September to 19 December 2010:
  - 15–26 September: Sidney Harman Hall, Shakespeare Theatre Company, Harman Center for the Arts, Washington DC
  - 29 September – 17 October: Guthrie Theater, McGuire Proscenium Stage, Minneapolis, MN
  - 22 October – 7 November: The Roda Theatre, Berkeley Repertory Theatre, Berkeley CA
  - 1 December – 19 December: The Public Theater, The Skirball, Washington Square, New York City
- Two-hour radio adaptation of four plays (Bugles at the Gates of Jalalabad, Miniskirts of Kabul, Honey and Canopy of Stars), with original cast and introduction by Robin Lustig, in the Drama on 3 strand, BBC Radio 3, 8pm, 10 October 2010
- 10–11 February 2011: Sidney Harman Hall, Shakespeare Theatre Company, Harman Center for the Arts, Washington DC – Special encore performances offered free to soldiers, wounded veterans and government officials
