= Michael Hayden (actor) =

American actor

- Born: July 28, 1963 (age 62)
- Education: Juilliard School (BFA)
- Occupation: Actor
- Years active: 1991–present
- Known for: Carousel

Michael Hayden (born July 28, 1963) is an actor who has appeared both on the Broadway and West End stage, as well as on television. His best known role was Billy Bigelow in the stage musical, Carousel. He received both Laurence Olivier Award and Drama Desk Award nominations for his performance in the role. He also has starred as Clifford Bradshaw in various productions of Cabaret.

== Biography ==
Hayden graduated from the Juilliard School.

Stage

Hayden appeared in several productions at the Roundabout Theatre Company, New York, including The Matchmaker (1991) and All My Sons (1997). At the Lincoln Center Theater he appeared in Far East (1999) and the musical Dessa Rose (2005).

Hayden made his Broadway debut in the role of "Billy" in the 1994 Broadway revival of Carousel, for which he won the Theatre World Award and was nominated for the Drama Desk Award, Outstanding Actor in a Musical. He also played the role in the Royal National Theatre production in London in 1993, receiving an Olivier Award nomination for Best Actor in a Musical.

In 1999, he played Cliff in a Broadway revival of Cabaret. He reprised the role in 2006 in the West End.

For his work in the 2001 Broadway revival of Judgment at Nuremberg he received the Tony Award nomination as Best Featured Actor in a Play. He played "Prince Hal" in Henry IV opposite Kevin Kline in 2003. He appeared in the play Festen on Broadway in 2006.

In 2002, he played Franklin in Merrily We Roll Along at the Kennedy Center.

In 2010 he played the roles of both "Henry V" and "Richard II" at the Shakespeare Theatre Company, Washington, DC. For this work he received the company's Emery Battis Award. Hayden has appeared at the Shakespeare Theatre Company in many works over the years.

Hayden is set to return to Broadway in a revival of Elf the Musical as Walter for a limited holiday engagement at the Marquis Theatre with previews from November 9, 2024, an official opening on November 17, and closing expected on January 4, 2025. He'll star opposite Grey Henson as Buddy the Elf and Sean Astin as Santa Claus.

Television

Hayden has appeared on the television series Law & Order, Law & Order: Criminal Intent and Law & Order: Special Victims Unit, as well as Hack. He was a series regular on the ABC series Murder One.

Film

Hayden starred in the title role of William R. Pace's 1999 film Charming Billy as Jeremiah William Starkman, a commingling of Charles Whitman and Charles Starkweather who shoots random people off a rural water tower and reflects on the incidents in his life that led up to it. Hayden's portrayal won the Best Actor award at the AFI/LA Film Festival.

== Stage credits ==
Year(s)	Production	Role	Notes
2024-2025	Elf the Musical	Walter Hobbs	Broadway
2023	The Light in the Piazza	Roy Johnson	New York City Center
2023	A Little Night Music	Fredrik Egerman	Pasadena Playhouse
2021	The Sound of Music	Captain Georg von Trapp	The Muny
2019	All My Sons	Dr. Jim Bayliss	Broadway
2018	Much Ado About Nothing	Benedick	Old Globe Theatre
2016	American Son	Scott Ellis	Barrington Stage Company
2014	The Winter's Tale	Leontes	Sidney Harman Hall
2011	Measure for Measure	Angelo	Delacorte Theatre
2010	Henry V	King Henry V	Sidney Harman Hall
2010	Richard II	King Richard II	Sidney Harman Hall
2009	The Dog in the Manger	Teodoro	Shakespeare Theatre Company
2008	'Tis Pity She's a Whore	Giovanni	American Conservatory Theater
2006-2007	Cabaret	Clifford Bradshaw	West End
2006	Festen	Christian	Broadway
2005	Dessa Rose	Adam Nehemiah	Broadway
2003	Henry IV	Henry Prince of Wales	Broadway; a combined production of Henry IV, Part 1 and an abridged version of Henry IV, Part 2
2003	Enchanted April	Mr. Anthony Wilding	Broadway
2002	Merrily We Roll Along	Franklin Shepard	Kennedy Center
2001	Judgment at Nuremberg	Oscar Rolfe	Broadway
1999-2001	Cabaret	Clifford Bradshaw	Broadway
1998-1999	Far East	Sparky Watts	Broadway
1998	Sweet Bird of Youth	Chance Wayne	Shakespeare Theatre Company
1996	All My Sons	Chris Keller	Williamstown Theatre Festival
1994	Carousel	Billy Bigelow	Broadway
1992-1994	Carousel	Billy Bigelow	West End
1989	Anything Goes	Billy Crocker	Hope Summer Repertory Theatre
1988	Fiddler on the Roof	Perchik	Hope Summer Repertory Theatre
1987	The Sound of Music	Ensemble	Hope Summer Repertory Theatre
