= Mary Zimmerman =

American theatre director and playwright

- Born: August 23, 1960 (age 66); Lincoln, Nebraska, U.S.
- Education: Northwestern University (BS. MA, PhD)
- Occupations: Professor, Northwestern University; Jaharis Family Foundation Chair in Performance Studies
- Organizations: Lookingglass Theatre Company; Goodman Theatre
- Known for: Theatre & opera director, playwright
- Awards: Tony Award for Best Direction; • Metamorphoses (2002); MacArthur Fellowship (1998)

Mary Zimmerman (born August 23, 1960) is an American theatre and opera director and playwright from Nebraska. She is an ensemble member of the Lookingglass Theatre Company, the Manilow Resident Director at the Goodman Theatre in Chicago, Illinois, and also serves as the Jaharis Family Foundation Professor of Performance Studies at Northwestern University.

She has earned national and international recognition in the form of numerous awards, including the prestigious John D. and Catherine T. MacArthur Fellowship (1998). She has received more than 20 Joseph Jefferson Awards for her creative work in the Chicago Area and won a 2002 Tony Award for Best Direction for her adaptation of Ovid's Metamorphoses. Other notable productions include Eleven Rooms of Proust and The Secret in the Wings.

== Early life and education ==
Although Zimmerman was born in Lincoln, Nebraska, she spent much of her childhood in Europe, splitting time between her parents' home outside London in Hampstead Garden, England, and in Paris. Both of her parents were academics at the University of Nebraska–Lincoln, her father a physics professor and her mother a professor of comparative literature who studied the author George Sand.

Zimmerman studied theatre and performance studies at Northwestern University, where she received a BS in Theatre (1982) in addition to an MA (1985) and PhD (1994) in Performance Studies.

== Director, librettist, and producer ==
Zimmerman's involvement in stage productions is difficult to categorize, since she may be billed as director, writer, or producer, but usually takes on several of these roles. She is well known for her revivals of old plays and re-adaptions of classical and pre-classical works, librettos for modern operas, and re-presenting modern film and novels as stage plays.

=== Play productions ===
Zimmerman has directed several theatrical adaptations of literary works in addition to Metamorphoses (which she originally staged at Northwestern University as Six Myths in 1996), including Journey to the West, the Odyssey, Silk, Arabian Nights (1994), and The Notebooks of Leonardo da Vinci (2003).

In 2004, she directed a production of Pericles, Prince of Tyre at the Shakespeare Theatre Company in Washington, D.C. Her production was re-staged in 2006 at the Shakespeare Theatre Company Free For All. The following year, Zimmerman directed another Shakespeare play, Cymbeline, at Northwestern University.

In 2006, she directed a version of the Greek story of Jason and the Argonauts' search for the Golden Fleece, Argonautika, at the Lookingglass Theatre Company, and then toured it at the Berkeley Repertory Theatre in 2007, and at the Shakespeare Theatre Company in Washington, D.C. in 2008. Her monodrama, M. Proust, was given its world premiere by the Steppenwolf Theatre Company in 2006 in a production directed by Eric Rosen and starring Mary Beth Peil as Celeste Albaret.

In 2017, Zimmerman directed her adaption of Homer's Odyssey at the Oregon Shakespeare Festival.

In 2018, Zimmerman adapted and directed Hans Christian Andersen's The Steadfast Tin Soldier at Lookingglass Theatre Company. The production was remounted the following year.

In July 2019, "Treasure Island: A Play"--Zimmerman's adaptation of Robert Louis Stevenson's "Treasure Island"--was published by Northwestern University Press.

=== Opera productions ===
She has also worked in opera production. She is the director and co-librettist of the 2002 opera Galileo Galilei, music by Philip Glass, commissioned by the Goodman Theatre. In 2007 Zimmerman directed the first of a series of new productions for the Metropolitan Opera: She was engaged to stage a new production of Donizetti's Lucia di Lammermoor starring Natalie Dessay, which opened the company's 2007–2008 season. The production received mixed reviews, but was a success at the box office. Zimmerman's Lucia was revived in 2008–2009 with Diana Damrau and Anna Netrebko as Lucia. It was broadcast worldwide in the Met's Live in HD series with Netrebko and tenor Piotr Beczała.

In March 2009 the Met premiered Zimmerman's production of Vincenzo Bellini's La sonnambula (starring Dessay and Juan Diego Flórez). The production, which moved the opera's setting to a contemporary rehearsal hall, received mixed-to-negative reviews in the press. It was also presented in the Live in HD series. For the company's 2009–2010 season Zimmerman directed a new production of Gioachino Rossini's opera Armida starring Renée Fleming. Her fourth production for the Met was Dvořák's Rusalka in 2017, to positive reviews.

In February 2020 she directed the world premiere of the opera Eurydice, composed by Matthew Aucoin with a libretto by Sarah Ruhl, at the Los Angeles Opera.

Zimmerman adapted the libretto of Mozart’s The Magic Flute and directed a premiere of The Matchbox Magic Flute, which she described as “a hybrid, a playful variation, more a creature of the theatre [than of] opera," at the Goodman Theatre in February-March 2024.

=== Musical productions ===
In 2013, Zimmerman adapted and directed a musical version of Disney's version of The Jungle Book, premiering at the Goodman Theatre in Chicago and the Huntington Theatre in Boston. The production featured Kevin Carolan as Baloo the Bear, André De Shields as King Louie, and Akash Chopra as Mowgli.

In 2015 Zimmerman directed the musical Guys and Dolls at the Oregon Shakespeare Festival.
