= Michael Kahn (theatre director) =

American theatre director and drama educator

Michael Kahn CBE
- Born: September 9, 1937 (age 89); Brooklyn, New York, United States
- Education: Columbia University (BA)
- Occupations: Director, Artistic Director, Teacher
- Years active: ~1950–present
- Employer: Shakespeare Theatre Company

Michael Kahn CBE (born September 9, 1937) is an American theater director and drama educator. He was the artistic director of the Shakespeare Theatre Company in Washington, D.C., from 1986 until his retirement in 2019. He held the position of Richard Rodgers Director of the Drama Division of the Juilliard School from 1992 to 2006.

After beginning his career off-off-Broadway in 1964, directing experimental theater and other works, Kahn had both notable failures and successes with Broadway projects, winning acclaim especially for productions of The Royal Family (1975–76) and Show Boat (1983). He joined the Juilliard School's faculty in 1968, becoming the head of its drama school. During his long tenure as artistic director of the Shakespeare Theatre Company, Kahn has overseen its growth, including initiating its Free For All productions. He has also acted as artistic director for several other companies, continued to direct regional theater and opera, and received various awards and honors.

== Early life and career ==
Kahn was born in Brooklyn, New York. He attended the High School for the Performing Arts and received a Bachelor of Arts from the Columbia College of Columbia University.

Kahn's career began off-off-Broadway by directing Jean-Claude van Itallie's War Sex and Dreams and America Hurrah at La MaMa Experimental Theatre Club in 1964–65. He directed the Wallace Grey play Helen which ran off-Broadway at the Bouwerie Lane Theatre in December 1964 and the Thornton Wilder one-act plays The Long Christmas Dinner, Queens of France, and The Happy Journey to Trenton and Camden in September to November 1966 at the off-Broadway Cherry Lane Theatre. He won critical praise for his direction of the New York Shakespeare Festival production of Measure for Measure in 1966 at the Delacorte Theater. He next directed The Rimers of Eldritch at the off-Broadway Cherry Lane Theatre in February and March 1967. After this, he directed his first project for Broadway, The Freaking Out of Stephanie Blake (1967), a troubled production that never opened. His second Broadway play, Here's Where I Belong, closed after one performance, in March 1968. Additional Broadway credits include several Shakespeare plays and revivals of Cat on a Hot Tin Roof (1974–75), The Royal Family (1975–76), Whodunnit (1982–83), and Show Boat (1983), among others. He was nominated for the Tony Award for Best Direction of a Musical for Show Boat, and won the Drama Desk Award for Outstanding Revival as producing director of The Royal Family.

Kahn has also directed opera and regional theater. He was the artistic director for both the American Shakespeare Theatre (in 1969) and The Acting Company (1978–1988), producing director for the McCarter Theatre (1974), and founder and head of The Chautauqua Theater Company in 1983. In 2012, he accepted the Regional Theatre Tony Award as artistic director of the Shakespeare Theatre Company.

== Juilliard School ==
Kahn joined the Juilliard School faculty in 1968 and became the Richard Rodgers Director of Juilliard Drama, head of the school, in 1992. He resigned as the head of the school in 2005 and continued as Teacher of Acting.

== Shakespeare Theatre Company ==
In 1986, Kahn became artistic director of what was then known as The Folger Theatre Group or The Folger Theatre, now the Shakespeare Theatre Company. During his time with the company, Kahn has supervised its move from the Folger Shakespeare Library to the Lansburgh Theatre, and the creation of the Shakespeare Theatre Company Free For All at Rock Creek Park's Carter Barron Amphitheatre. Kahn joined forces with George Washington University in 2000 to create the Academy for Classical Acting. This Masters of Fine Arts degree is a comprehensive one-year program that trains actors for the classical theater, with an emphasis on Shakespeare. Kahn oversaw the company's name change and construction of Sidney Harman Hall, part of the new Harman Center for the Arts, which expands artistic opportunities for the Shakespeare Theatre Company and other arts groups.

On February 8, 2017, Kahn announced that he would be resigning as artistic director in July 2019.

Kahn's Shakespeare Theatre Company directing credits include Henry IV, Part 1 and Henry IV, Part 2 in repertory, Wallenstein, The Government Inspector, Strange Interlude, The Heir Apparent (world premiere), Old Times, All's Well That Ends Well, The Liar, Richard II, The Alchemist, Design for Living, The Way of the World, Antony and Cleopatra, Tamburlaine, Hamlet, Richard III, The Beaux' Stratagem, Love's Labour's Lost, Othello, Lorenzaccio (world premiere), Macbeth, Cyrano, Five by Tenn, The Winter's Tale, The Silent Woman, The Oedipus Plays, The Duchess of Malfi, Timon of Athens, Don Carlos, Hedda Gabler, King Lear, Coriolanus, Camino Real, A Woman of No Importance, King John, The Merchant of Venice, Peer Gynt, Sweet Bird of Youth, combined Henry VI, Parts 1, 2 & 3, Mourning Becomes Electra, Henry V, Volpone, combined Henry IV, Parts 1 & 2, Richard II, The Doctor's Dilemma, Mother Courage and Her Children, Much Ado About Nothing, Measure for Measure, Richard III, Twelfth Night, The Merry Wives of Windsor, As You Like It, All's Well That Ends Well, and Romeo and Juliet.

== Other work ==
=== Regional theater ===
In 1968, Michael Kahn directed the inaugural production of Camino Real by Tennessee Williams at the Robert S. Marx Theatre at Cincinnati Playhouse in the Park. In 1973, Kahn directed Old Times by Harold Pinter at Goodman Theatre.

Kahn directed 'Tis Pity She's a Whore at American Repertory Theater in 1988 and The Duchess of Malfi at the Guthrie Theater in 1989. In 1997 Kahn directed A Touch of the Poet at Arena Stage, Washington, D.C. Kahn directed Torch Song Trilogy at the Studio Theatre in Washington, D.C., which ran in September and October 2013. He also directed the world premiere of Pride in the Falls of Autrey Mill at the Signature Theatre in Arlington, Virginia, starring Christine Lahti, which opened in October 2013.

=== Opera ===
Kahn directed Georges Bizet's Carmen for the Washington Opera, produced at the Kennedy Center, in 1982. He directed the Samuel Barber opera Vanessa in 1995, which was presented at the Kennedy Center. He directed the Mark Adamo opera Lysistrata, or The Nude Goddess for the Houston Grand Opera in 2005. For the Dallas Opera he directed Romeo and Juliet by Charles Gounod in 2011.

== Honors and awards ==
=== American Theater Hall of Fame ===
For his long history and influence in American theater, including his early work in the avant-garde theater scene in New York, leadership of the Chautauqua Theater Company and McCarter Theatre, his tenure as teacher and head of the drama division at Juilliard, and 25 years directing the Shakespeare Theatre Company, Kahn was nominated to the American Theater Hall of Fame. He was inducted on January 28, 2013.

=== Order of the British Empire ===
In recognition of his many successes in presenting Shakespeare in America, Michael Kahn was honored by Queen Elizabeth II as a Commander of the Most Excellent Order of the British Empire. The award was presented by British Ambassador Peter Westmacott at a ceremony at the Ambassador's Residence on April 23, 2013, Shakespeare's birthday.

=== Awards ===
- CAGLCC Excellence in Business Award (2011)
- WAPAVA Richard Bauer Award (2010)
- Mayor's Arts Award Special Recognition for Shakespeare in Washington (2007)
- Gielgud Award for Excellence in the Dramatic Arts (2007)
- Person of the Year from the National Theatre Conference (2005)
- Shakespeare Society Medal (2004)
- William Shakespeare Award for Classical Theatre (2002)
- Distinguished Washingtonian Award from The University Club (2002)
- GLAAD Capitol Award (2002)
- Mayor's Arts Award for Excellence in an Artistic Discipline (1997)
- Opera Music Theater International's Bravo Award (1996)
- First Annual Shakespeare's Globe Award (1990)
- Washingtonian magazine, Washingtonian of the Year (1989)
- Washington Post Award for Distinguished Community Service (1989)
- John Houseman Award (1988)
- Saturday Review Award (1967)

In addition to the Tony, Drama Desk and other awards noted above, Kahn has also received multiple Vernon Rice Award nominations, a MacArthur Award, two New Jersey Critic's Awards, the Daily News Critic's Citation, and multiple Helen Hayes Award nominations and wins. He was nominated as Director, Musical, for a 1974 Joseph Jefferson Award for The Tooth of Crime.

=== Personal life ===
Kahn married his partner, Charles Mitchem, on May 17, 2015. Supreme Court Justice Ruth Bader Ginsburg officiated.
