= Harman Center for the Arts =

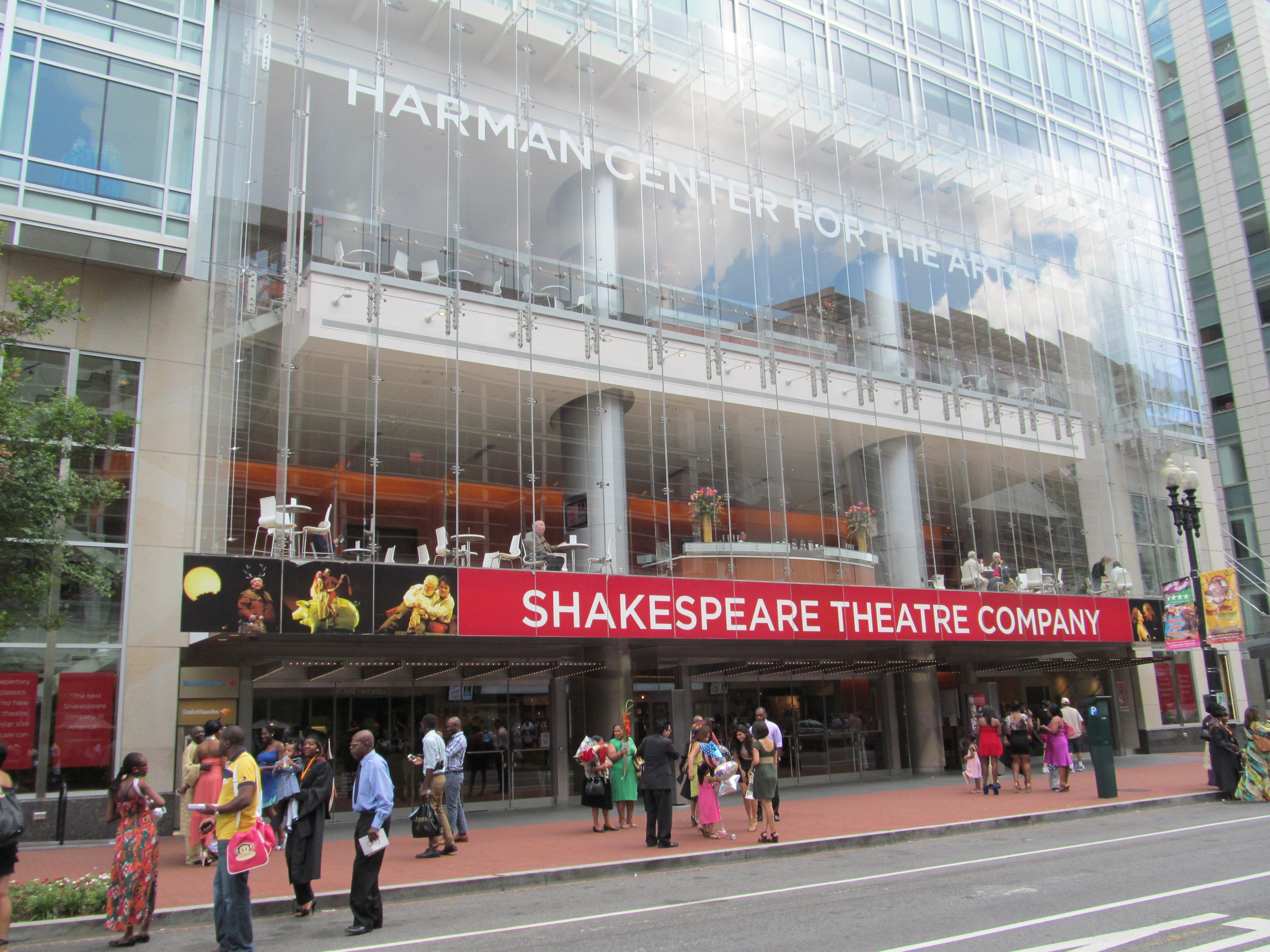
- Entrance to the Harman Center for the Arts

- Location within Washington, D.C.
- Address: Washington, D.C. United States
- Coordinates: 38.895833°N 77.022222°W

Construction
- Opened: 2007

Website
- www.shakespearetheatre.org

The Harman Center for the Arts is a complex consisting of the Michael R. Klein Theatre (450 7th Street NW) and Sidney Harman Hall (SHH; at Sixth and F Streets NW) in downtown Washington, D.C., US.

SHH is the latest addition to the existing Lansburgh Theatre to create the new "Center For the Arts". Construction began in November 2004 and it opened on September 15, 2007. Jack Diamond designed the theatre and Paul Beckmann of the DC firm Smithgroup designed the building that houses the theatre at a cost of $89 million. Both theatres are home to Washington, D.C.'s Shakespeare Theatre Company (STC), but the new theatre will extend its performance spaces to other local arts groups in the hope of broadening Washington’s appeal as an arts scene.

The Harman Center is named for the Harman family and former STC Board of Trustees member the late Sidney Harman, who provided much of the financial support for its construction. Michael Kahn, Artistic Director of the STC, serves as Artistic Director of the Harman Center.

== Usage ==
The completion of the Harman Center allows the STC to expand its season to seven plays, four at SHH (which seats 755) and three at its current location, the Lansburgh Theatre (which seats 451), in addition to the Company’s annual Free For All, formerly held outdoors at Rock Creek Park’s Carter Barron Amphitheatre, but from 2009's production of The Taming of the Shrew, has been on the main stage at the Company's SHH in downtown Washington.

SHH will have multiple stage configurations making it adaptable to the needs of each performance while the Harman Center will make it possible to develop the existing STC's educational programs in order to reach even more local students. Performances and programs will be made more accessible with the availability of discounted tickets.

== Other participating arts groups ==
- Washington Performing Arts Society
- The Washington Ballet
- Dance Place
- The Washington Bach Consort
- City Dance Ensemble
- Summer Opera Theatre Company
- Capital Fringe Festival

== Project partners ==
- Shakespeare Theatre Company
- Michael Kahn
- Sidney Harman
- Smithgroup
- City of Washington, D.C

== See also ==
- Theater in Washington D.C.
