= Concert performance =

Performance of a musical theater or opera in concert form

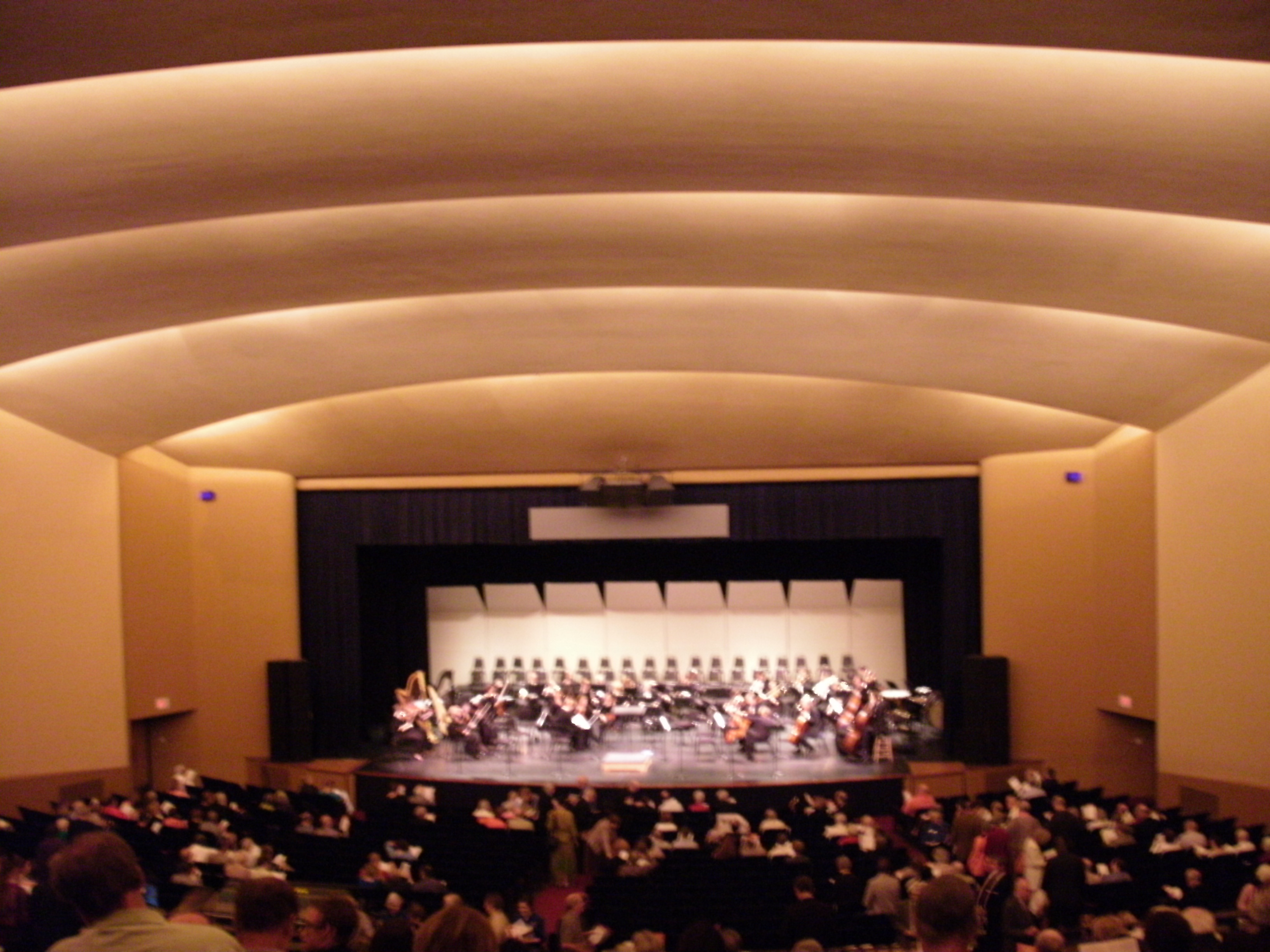
Washington Concert Opera on stage at Lisner Auditorium, 2009

A concert performance or concert version is a performance of a musical theater or opera in concert form, typically without set design or costumes, and mostly without theatrical interaction between singers.

Concert performances are commonly presented in concert halls without a theater stage, but occasionally also in opera houses when a scenic production is deemed impractical or expensive. During a concert performance in an opera house, the orchestra does not play in the orchestra pit. Frequently, they play on the stage, with the choir (chorus) behind them and the soloists standing in front of them.

Concert performances, which cost less to produce and require less rehearsal, have been produced since some of the earliest operas of the 17th century; this mode has become increasingly popular in the 21st century.

Since 1960, concert performances have been a part of the annual Salzburg Festival alongside scenic productions. In Theater an der Wien, concert performances have been presented regularly since 2006, particularly of baroque operas with elaborate set designs.

== Opera performances ==
Some companies such as Washington Concert Opera, the American Opera Society, Eve Queler's Opera Orchestra of New York and the Baltimore Concert Opera have specialized in performing operas in concert version. Tanglewood Music Center Orchestra, led by James Levine, performed a concert version of Elektra in 2006. The Boston Symphony Orchestra performed semi-staged concerts of Elektra, led by Seiji Ozawa, in 1987 and 1988.

== Musical theatre performances ==
Ongoing musical theatre concert series are given in some cities, such as the Encores! and Musicals Tonight! concert series in New York City and the Lost Musicals series in London. York Theatre Company in New York City presents staged concerts in its "Musicals in Mufti" concert series, which "has uncovered a number of needlessly forgotten gems ... presenting more titles than any other theatrical concert series in the world." 42nd Street Moon in San Francisco, California, presents staged concerts of musicals to highlight "early and lesser-known works". The Ravinia Festival in Highland Park, Illinois also presents staged musical theatre concerts. For example, the festival presented a concert version of Gypsy starring Patti LuPone in 2006.

Symphony orchestras also present concert versions of musical theatre, such as the New York Philharmonic concert series in New York. San Francisco Symphony presented a concert version of West Side Story in 2013, and a semi-staged production of On the Town in 2016. Philadelphia Orchestra presented a staged concert version of the musical A Little Night Music in 2001.

The English National Opera (ENO) presented a semi-staged concert of Sunset Boulevard in 2016. In 2015 the ENO gave a concert production of Sweeney Todd.

== Benefits ==
Concert versions of operas and musicals are also presented as benefits. For example, Actors Fund of America has presented concerts of musicals such as On the Twentieth Century, Dreamgirls, Funny Girl, Chess and Hair. A concert version of Anyone Can Whistle was presented as a benefit for Gay Men's Health Crisis at Carnegie Hall in 1995. The 10th Anniversary reunion of Into the Woods was presented as a concert in 1997, to benefit Friends In Deed and God's Love We Deliver. James Lapine noted that this concert was "a bit more informal" than the concert reunion of Sunday in the Park with George, which was given in formal dress.

Some companies produce staged concerts to benefit the company. For example, Roundabout Theatre Company in New York City has presented such concerts, including Assassins (2012) and She Loves Me (2011).
