= Shakespeare in Washington Festival =

2007 cultural festival held in Washington, D.C.

The Shakespeare in Washington Festival was a cultural festival held in Washington, D.C. from January through June 2007 in honor of the works of William Shakespeare.

More than 40 arts organizations from Washington and around the world participated in Shakespeare in Washington, a festival featuring a vast array of theater, music, and dance, as well as films, art exhibits, and many other events at the Kennedy Center and other venues across the D.C. area.

This event was conceived by Michael M. Kaiser, president of the Kennedy Center, and was curated by Michael Kahn, artistic director of the Shakespeare Theatre Company.

== Participating international organizations ==
- Cameri Theatre of Israel
- Kirov Ballet
- Kirov Opera and Orchestra
- Dame Cleo Laine
  and Sir John Dankworth,
- The Nash Ensemble of London
- The Royal Shakespeare Company

== Participating national organizations ==
- Alexandria Symphony Orchestra
- American Ballet Theatre
- American Film Institute
- Cathedral Choral Society
- The Chesapeake Shakespeare Company
- Folger Shakespeare Library and Theatre
- Folger Consort
- The John F. Kennedy Center for the Performing Arts
- The National Archives
- National Building Museum
- National Gallery of Art
- National Museum of American History
- National Museum of the American Indian,
- National Portrait Gallery
- National Symphony Orchestra
- New York City Ballet
- The Phillips Collection
- The Shakespeare Guild
- The Shakespeare Theatre Company
- Signature Theatre
- Smithsonian Jazz Masterworks Orchestra
- The Studio Theatre
- The Suzanne Farrell Ballet
- Synetic Theatre
- Theatre J
- The University of Maryland, College Park Center for Renaissance and Baroque Studies
- Vocal Arts Society
- VSA arts
- The Washington Ballet
- Washington Concert Opera
- Washington National Opera
- Washington Performing Arts Society
- The Washington Savoyards
- Washington Shakespeare Company
- Woolly Mammoth Theatre Company
