= Washington Concert Opera =

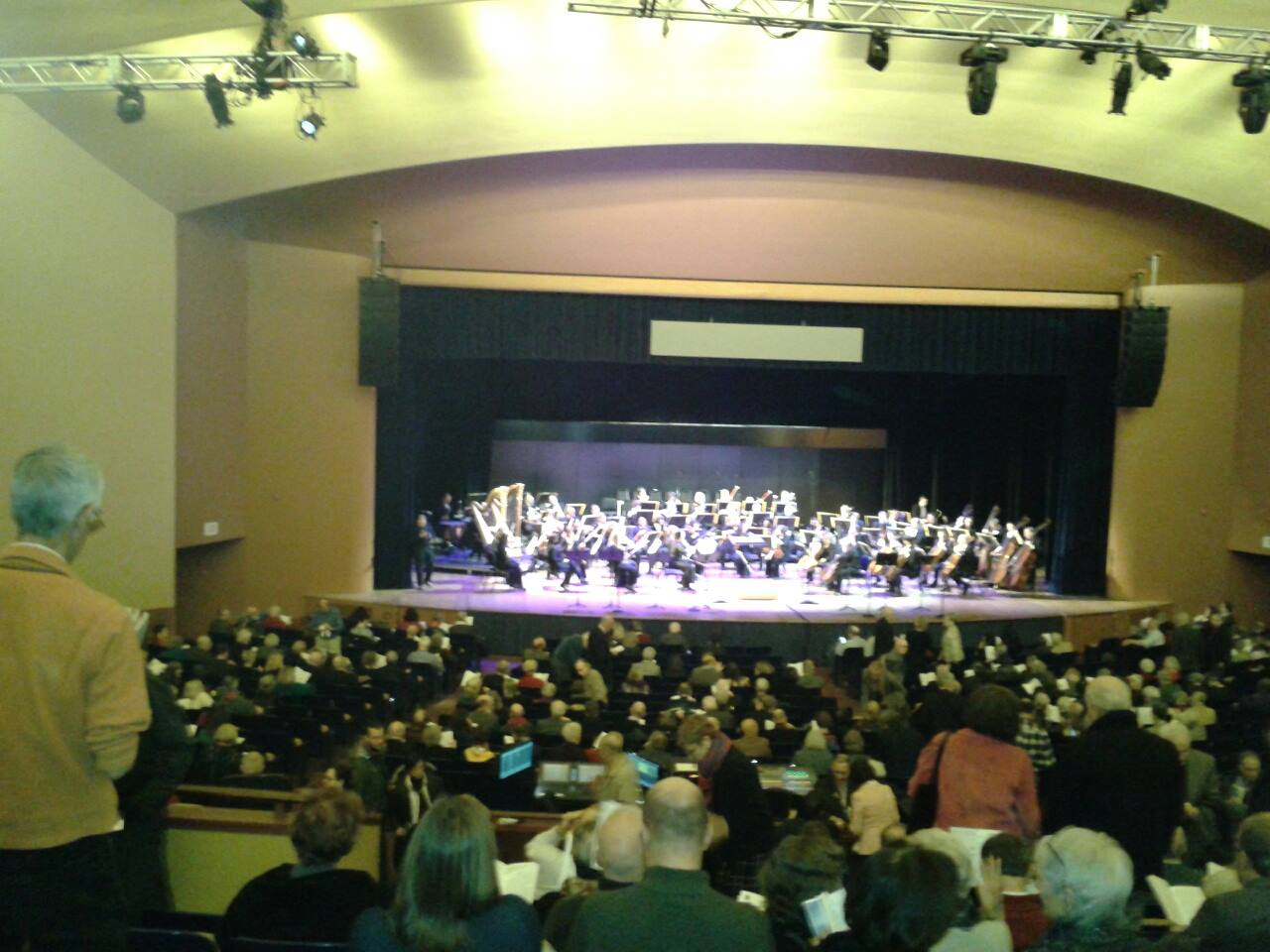
View of the stage at Lisner Auditorium before a performance of Guntram by Richard Strauss by the Washington Concert Opera in 2015

Washington Concert Opera is a professional opera company located in Washington, D.C. in the United States which presents operas in a concert format with full orchestra and chorus. WCO's distinctive repertoire consists of operas which either have not been presented recently in the Washington area, or are infrequently performed anywhere, or which represent opportunities to showcase artists.

Typically, WCO presents two operas each season, one each in the autumn and spring, in Lisner Auditorium located on the campus of the George Washington University. During the early 2000s, the company presented operas in the Kennedy Center's Concert Hall, but with rather disastrous economic consequences:

We came perilously close to losing the Washington Concert Opera two summers ago. The troupe, which has presented concert performances of rare and unusual operas here since 1986, had made an ambitious but prohibitively expensive move to the Kennedy Center Concert Hall and suddenly realized it was going broke, with an annual deficit that had climbed to $200,000.

As of the 2005 season, WCO returned to the Lisner Auditorium.

== The organization ==
Performers are often internationally acclaimed singers, professional musicians and chorus members who give rarely heard, full-length operatic works. Washington Concert Opera has presented almost 50 operas in the concert format since 1986, and they have featured world-class singers who regularly appear on the stages of major opera houses.

Under Stephen Crout, 1986 to 2002

The company was founded in 1986 by Stephen Crout along with Peter Russell. Crout served as General Director and conductor for 15 years in presenting rarely seen or relatively rare concert versions of significant operas. He also conducted in the DC area, specifically at the Wolf Trap Park summer festival season. In addition, Stephen Crout was a recipient of the "OMTI Bravo International Award" from the Washington, DC area based Opera Music Theater International organisation.

In reference to Crout's conducting of Rossini's William Tell, in August 1998 Opera News notes:

General director Stephen Crout conducted, taking a characteristically spacious view of this long score and drawing an exciting sound from his orchestral forces, whose playing sparkled with witty pointing of phrase and rhythm. He sustained the tension of the unfolding drama with a judiciously paced reading, capturing in sound the changing landscape.

In 2012, with the 25th Anniversary of WCO, Crout, as well as Russell (the former WCO artistic adviser, in addition to being the former Director of the Wolf Trap Opera Company and presently Artistic Director of the Vocal Arts DC) were honored for their service.

Under Antony Walker, since 2002

In 2002, Antony Walker became Artistic Director and conductor. He is also Music Director of Pittsburgh Opera and co-artistic director of Pinchgut Opera, a chamber opera company, in Sydney, Australia.

Describing Walker's strengths—in regard to the 2012 performance of La sonnambula—Anne Midgette, the Washington Post music critic, noted:

One reason the whole thing sparkled is that conductor Antony Walker....approaches music with the kind of spark and verve that made some of us fall in love with it in the first place. He got a kind of precision out of the WCO orchestra...[and]...also actively supported the singers, or got out of their way — for instance, at the end of [Eglise] Gutierrez’s and [Rene] Barbera’s exquisite duet at the end of the first scene, in which they engage in a series of a capella vocal arabesques simply to say good night.

In an interview with Gary Tischler, who believes that "the work [Walker] does with the WCO is close to his heart", Antony Walker presented his own "take" on what concert opera means to him:

"...We have a slogan", he said. "It’s all about the music". It's not an either-or thing. It's a different way of seeing, experience and hearing opera, for that matter.......In a way, you 'see' a different sort of opera. It's much more intimate. And, as a conductor, you’re very much exposed. You’re a part of everything in a way that everyone can see."

In 2007, with the presentation of Rossini's Otello, the WCO was a part of the Shakespeare in Washington Festival, a six-month-long series given by many different local, national, and international organisations in Washington, DC, all reflecting multiple facets of Shakespeare's work.

== Distinctive characteristics of concert opera ==
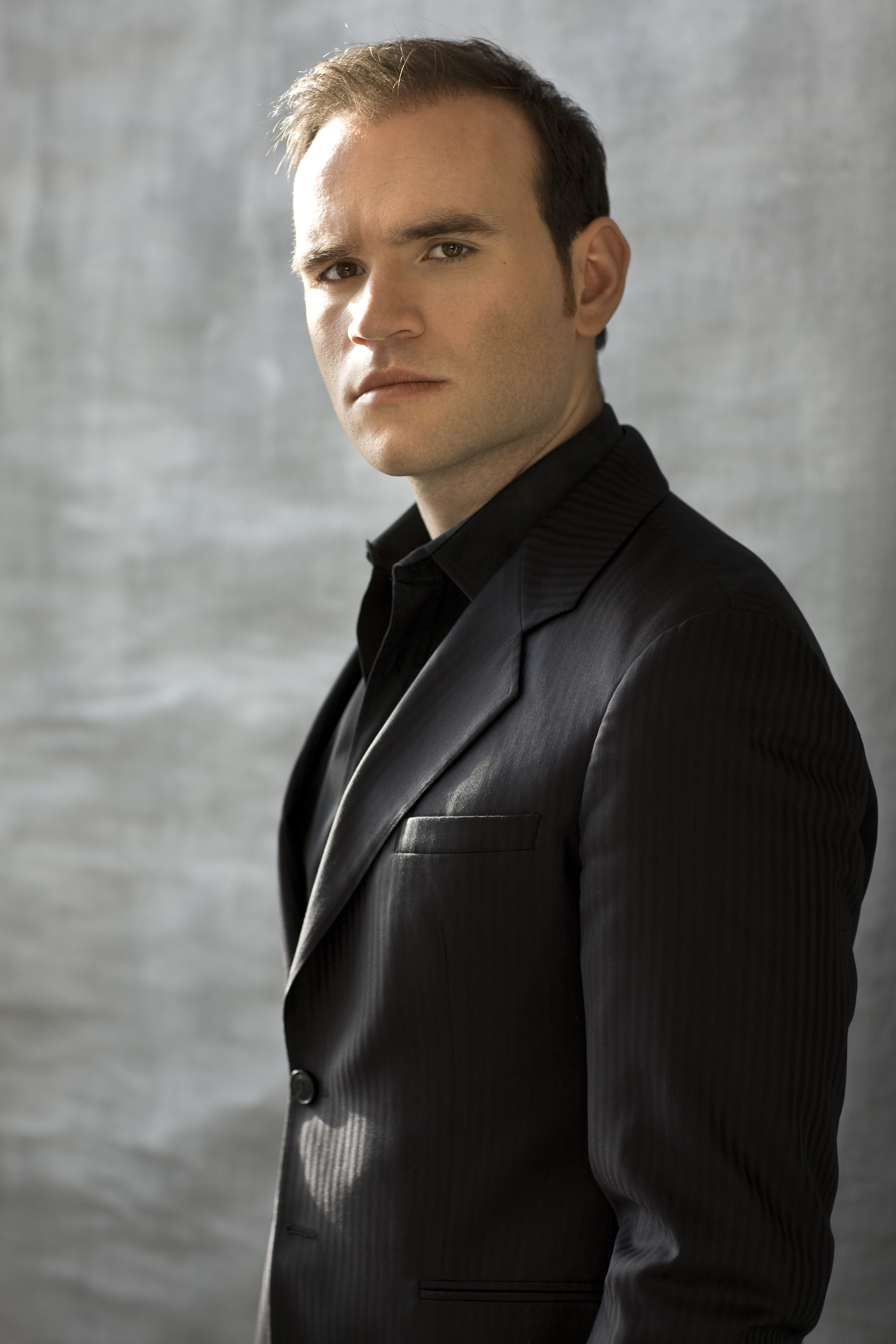
Michael Fabiano (courtesy of Dario Acosta)

In his interview with Susan Galbraith, tenor Michael Fabiano, who appeared in the March 2014 presentation of Verdi's early Il corsaro (The Corsair), expands upon the appeal of concert opera and defines what, for him as a performer, are some of the distinctive elements of concert opera production which distinguish it from fully staged and costumed productions:

Concert opera is a totally different vehicle than standard opera because here the music speaks solely by and for itself. There are no distractions, and an audience can focus on the power of the human voice. ... in concert opera, audiences have an opportunity to experience the essence of opera – to appreciate the sound of the human voice and the fabric of orchestra. It's also an opportunity to hear an extremely rare opera at a fraction of the cost.

In describing the special challenges or opportunities for the singer in concert opera, Fabiano goes on to explain:

Everything – the story and the relationships – has to be communicated through the voice. But I love this. I’ve been studying Il Corsaro for months. The rehearsal process is truncated, yes. A staged opera might have two-to-seven weeks but here there is only one rehearsal with everyone. You must be very prepared, and the rehearsal is very focused.

== Significant artists who have appeared in WCO productions ==
Over the years, the company has brought, and often introduced, to local audiences singers of the caliber of

1988: Jerry Hadley (in Werther); 1988: Sumi Jo (in I Capuleti e i Montecchi, and in I Puritani in 1990); 1989: Alessandra Marc (in Ariadne auf Naxos); 1991: Renée Fleming (in Thais); 1992: Denyce Graves (in Anna Bolena); 1992: Deborah Voigt (in Der Freischütz, as well as the 15th Anniversary concert in 2002); 1994: Ben Heppner (as the title character in Andrea Chenier); 1995: James Morris (as the Dutchman); 1998: Patricia Racette (in Guillaume Tell); 2007: Kenneth Tarver (in Rossini's Otello, and in La Cenerentola in 2010); 2008: Vivica Genaux (in Rossini's Bianca e Falliero, and in La cenerentola in 2010); 2009: Stephanie Blythe in concert; 2009: John Reylea (in Faust, as well as Attila in 2011); 2009:Elizabeth Futral (in Il giuramento); 2009: James Valenti (in Il giuramento and as Maurizio in Adriana Lecouvrer in 2010); 2010: Jennifer Larmore (the American mezzo-soprano sang Charlotte in Werther); 2013: Lisette Oropesa (in I masnadieri as Amalia);

Young artists such as Celena Shafer (in Esclarmonde in 2005), and both Sarah Coburn and Lawrence Brownlee—winner of the 2006 Richard Tucker and Marian Anderson Awards—who both appeared in I Puritani in 2007, have also made their area debuts with WCO.

In March 2014, up-and-coming tenor Michael Fabiano appeared in a rarely performed early Verdi opera, Il corsaro.

== Recognition ==
Washington Concert Opera has repeatedly and consistently been acclaimed in the local, national, and international press as one of the finest in the field, having been designated by critics as “integral to the musical fabric of this city” (in The Washington Post) and praised as offering “....performances of the highest order” (in Opera News).

Critic Tim Page of The Washington Post has noted on more than one occasion, some distinguishing features of the company and its contribution to the artistic life of Washington, DC:

[WCO] has now joined the Vocal Arts Society and the Washington Performing Arts Society-sponsored Patrick and Evelyn Swarthout Hayes Piano Series as one of the few groups in town whose offerings should never be missed.

Indeed, WCO's presentations of lesser-known operas, always worthy occasions, have lately become an essential part of Washington's musical life, events that deserve national – even international – attention. A capacity audience [for Rossini's Otello] found it well worth its while to put up with the stifling heat inside the auditorium for more than three hours – and stayed to cheer.
