= Far East (play) =

Play written by A. R. Gurney

Far East is a 1998 play by American playwright A.R. Gurney.

== Productions ==
Far East was first produced at the Williamstown Theatre Festival in July 1998. The director was Daniel Sullivan, with a cast that featured Scott Wolf, Bill Smitrovich, Linda Emond, Tohoru Masamune, and Paul Fitzgerald. It premiered Off-Broadway at the Lincoln Center's Mitzi E. Newhouse Theater in January 1999. The production's director was Daniel Sullivan, with a cast that featured Michael Hayden, Sonnie Brown, Lisa Emery, Bill Smitrovich, and Connor Trinneer.

It has since been produced in regional theatres, including the Studio Theatre in Washington, DC in 2001 and California's Laguna Playhouse in 2002.

The play was presented on the hit Public Television series Stage on Screen in 2001.

== Publication ==
Far East is published by Broadway Play Publishing Inc.
