= Shakespeare Theatre Company =

Non-profit theatre company in Washington, D.C.

Coordinates: 38.8956°N 77.0223°W

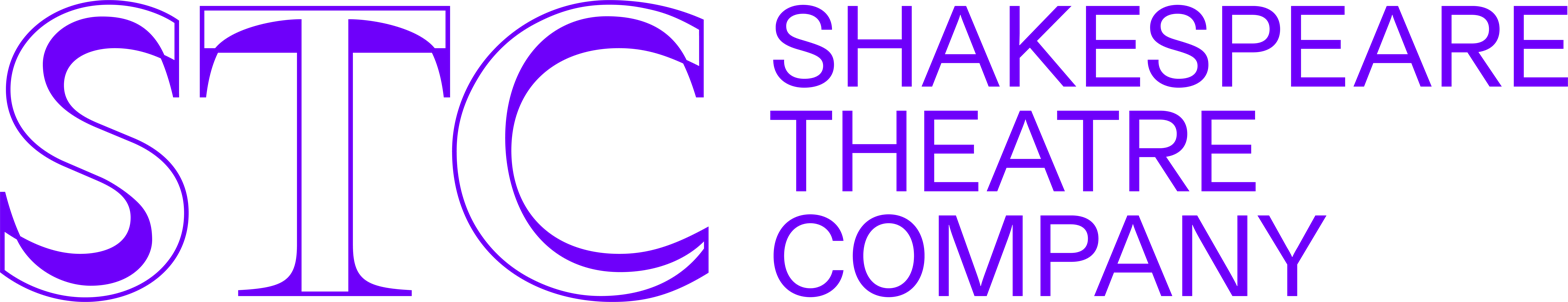
- Theatre logo
- Formation: 1986
- Type: Theatre group
- Location: Sidney Harman Hall, 610 F Street NW, Washington, D.C.; Klein Theatre, 450 7th Street NW, Washington, D C., U.S.
- Artistic director: Simon Godwin
- Website: www.shakespearetheatre.org

The Shakespeare Theatre Company is a regional theatre company located in Washington, D.C. The theatre company focuses primarily on plays from the Shakespeare canon, but its seasons include works by other classic playwrights such as Euripides, Ibsen, Wilde, Shaw, Schiller, Coward and Tennessee Williams. The company manages and performs in two spaces: The Michael R. Klein Theatre and Sidney Harman Hall. In cooperation with George Washington University, they run the STC Academy.

The company is a League of Resident Theatres member. Its current artistic director (since 2019) is Simon Godwin, who previously was based in London, serving as associate director of London's Royal National Theatre, associate director of the Royal Court Theatre and associate director at Bristol Old Vic.

== History ==
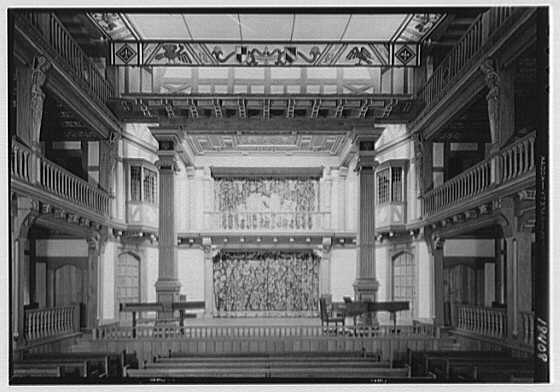
Folger Library Theater, circa 1932

The Folger Shakespeare Library on Capitol Hill includes a replica of an Elizabethan theatre, originally used for lectures and tours. In 1970 this space was transformed into a functioning playhouse, and soon Folger Theatre Group (later The Folger Theatre) was organized to perform.

After years of discussion, Amherst College, administering body of the Folger Shakespeare Library, in 1986 withdrew financial support for the company. To save the company, concerned citizens led by R. Robert Linowes reincorporated it as the non-profit Shakespeare Theatre at the Folger, later hiring Michael Kahn as artistic director. The company continued to perform at the Folger for the next six years.

Changing its name to The Shakespeare Theatre, the troupe moved in 1992 to the Lansburgh Theatre (now, the Klein Theatre), a newly built space in the original Lansburgh's Department Store building in the Penn Quarter. At the start of the 2005–06 season, it adopted the current name, Shakespeare Theatre Company. The company constructed another theatre, Sidney Harman Hall, which opened in 2007 in the lower part of an office building in the quarter, and the two theatres were joined to become the Harman Center for the Arts.

Meanwhile, after initially importing traveling shows from the Shenandoah Shakespeare Express the Folger Shakespeare Library developed a new Folger Theatre company to present plays in its Elizabethan replica.

== Facilities ==
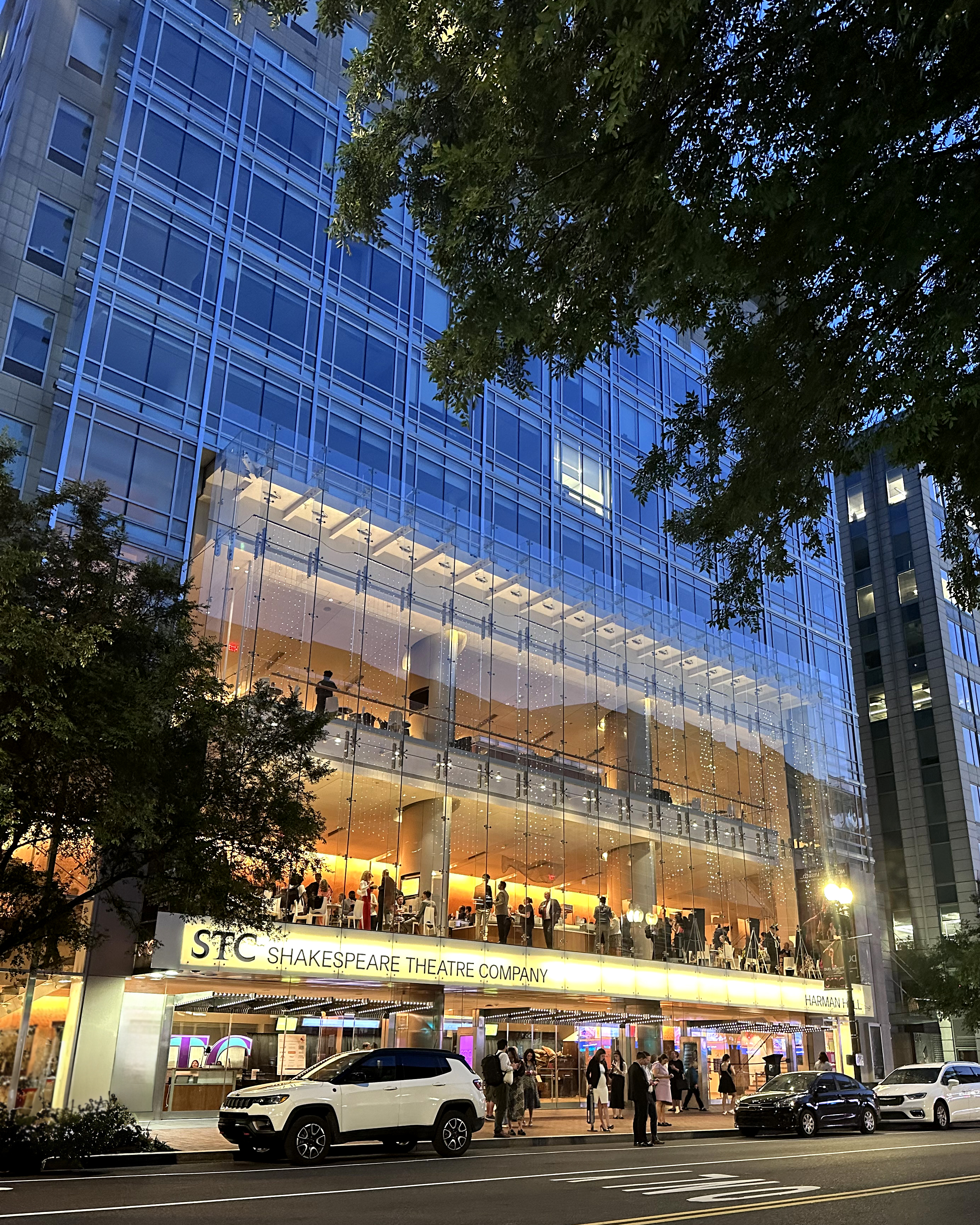
Sidney Harman Hall, 610 F Street NW, Washington, D.C.

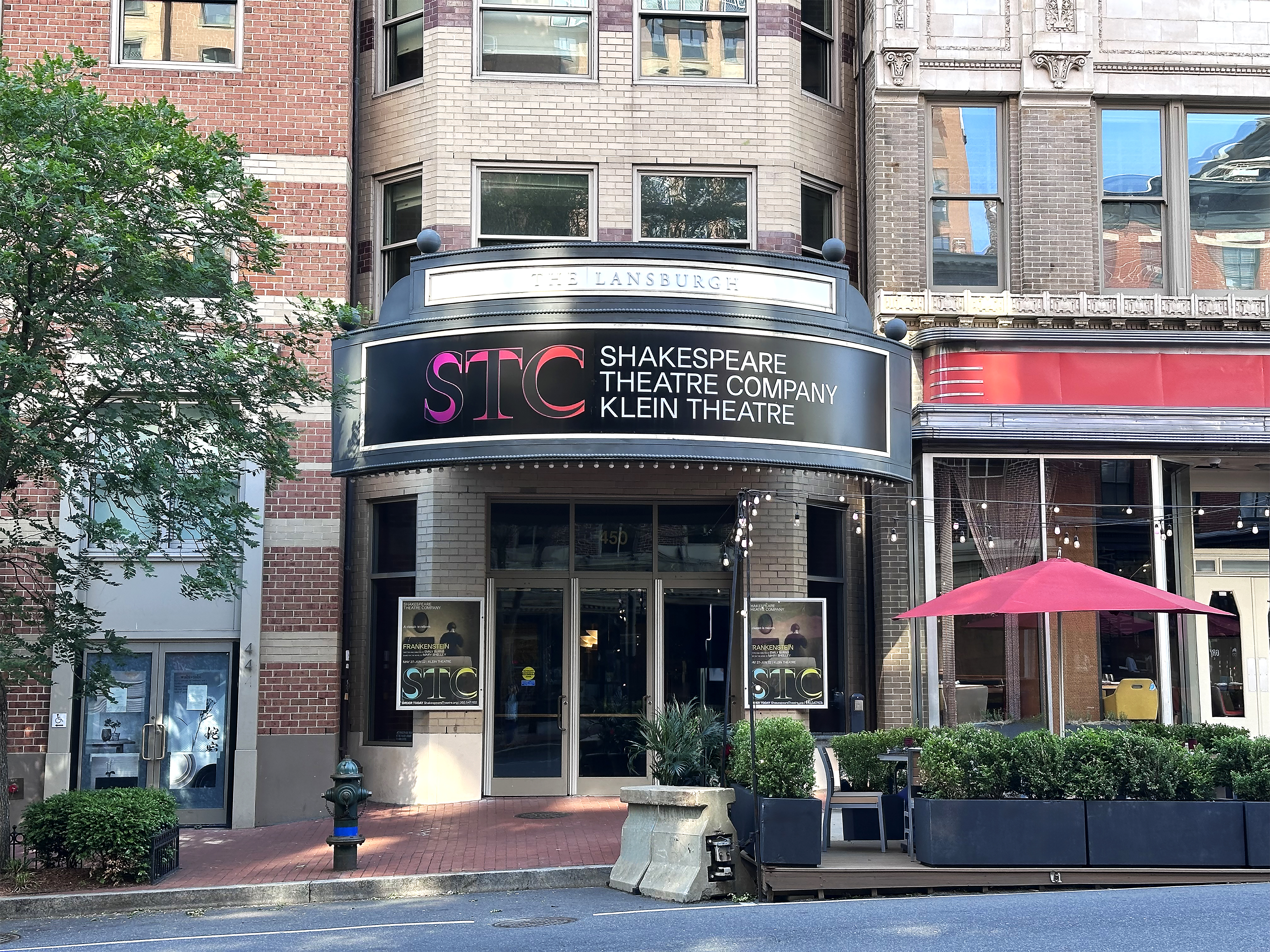
Lansburgh Theatre, 450 7th Street NW, Washington, D.C.

STC has two current performance venues. The newer and larger Sidney Harman Hall occupies the lower half of an 11-story office tower. The exterior is distinguished by a glass façade curtain wall on a projected bay window. The 761-seat performance space can be configured as a proscenium, thrust, semi-arena, corridor or bare stage. The smaller Klein Theatre (formerly the Lansburgh Theatre) is in the restored former Lansburgh's Department Store flagship store, originally built in 1882. The performance space is a 451-seat classic proscenium stage. The seating arrangement is reminiscent of a Greek Amphitheater. It has been described as "an intimate space for dramatic theatre, ensemble music, and dance"

In the past, the company has performed shows at the Terrace Theater in the Kennedy Center.

In addition to its performance spaces, the company maintains administrative offices, rehearsal studios, and a costume shop in the Capitol Hill neighborhood. A set construction and painting shop is near Catholic University in Northeast D.C. Finally a stage properties shop for the construction and storage of furniture, decorative items, hand props and a variety of set dressing items is located just outside D.C. on the northeast side of the city.

== Theatrical focus ==
The Shakespeare Theatre Company's self-professed mission is "...to present classic theatre of scope and size in an imaginative, skillful and accessible American style that honors the playwrights' language and intentions while viewing their work through a 21st-century lens". Their vision is to "... endeavor to be an important resource to an expanded national and international community—as the nation’s premier destination for classic theatre, as a training ground for the next generation of theatre artists and as a model provider of high-quality educational content for students and scholars."

=== Artistic directors ===
- Richmond Crinkley (1970–1973) (while Folger Theatre Group)
- Louis W. Scheeder (1973–1980) (while Folger Theatre Group)
- John Neville-Andrews (1980–1986) (name changed to Folger Theatre then Shakespeare Theatre at the Folger)
- Michael Kahn (1986–2019) (while Shakespeare Theatre at the Folger, then Shakespeare Theatre Company)
- Simon Godwin (2019–)

=== Current and recent productions ===
Resident theatre company pioneer Zelda Fichandler has stated that for resident theatre companies "repertory is destiny" – a theatre company acquires its audience by the productions it presents. Most of The Shakespeare Theatre Company's productions are from The Bard's canon. However each year up to half of the productions are classical works by other authors. The oldest has been Aeschylus's The Persians, the oldest surviving play in the history of theatre. The youngest plays include works by Tennessee Williams (Camino Real, Sweet Bird of Youth) and Harold Pinter (Old Times). The company has also produced modern interpretations of classical texts such as Mary Zimmerman's Argonautika (adapted from The Voyage of Jason and the Argonauts).

=== Notable guest artists ===
In addition to its troupe of regular and frequently appearing actors, the Shakespeare Theatre Company invites guest performers and directors each season.

- Jane Alexander – Ghosts (Mrs. Alving)
- Elizabeth Ashley – Mrs. Warren's Profession (Mrs Warren), The Little Foxes (Regina)
- Michael Attenborough – director (As You Like It)
- René Auberjonois – The Imaginary Invalid (Argan)
- Keith Baxter – actor, Measure For Measure (Duke Vincentio), Henry IV, Parts 1 and 2 (Henry IV), The Merchant of Venice (Antonio); director (Lady Windermere's Fan, The Imaginary Invalid, The Rivals, The Country Wife, Henry IV, Part 1, Mrs. Warren's Profession, An Ideal Husband, The Importance of Being Earnest)
- André Braugher – Othello (Iago)
- Avery Brooks – Othello (Othello), The Oedipus Plays (Oedipus), Tamburlaine (Tamburlaine)
- Ron Canada – Othello (Iago)
- Dixie Carter – Lady Windermere's Fan (Mrs. Erlynne)
- Jeffrey Carlson – Hamlet (Hamlet)
- Pat Carroll – Romeo and Juliet (Nurse), The Merry Wives of Windsor (Falstaff), Mother Courage and Her Children (Mother Courage), Volpone (Volpone)
- Gale Edwards – director (Edward II, Titus Andronicus, Richard III, Hamlet)
- Harry Hamlin – Henry V (Henry V)
- Hal Holbrook – The Merchant of Venice (Shylock)
- Tom Hulce – Hamlet (Hamlet)
- Stacy Keach – Richard III (Richard), King Lear (Lear), Henry IV, Parts 1 and 2 (Falstaff)
- Sabrina LeBeauf – Love's Labour's Lost (Rosaline), The Taming of the Shrew (Kathrine)
- Marsha Mason – All's Well That Ends Well (Countess of Rousillon)
- Kelly McGillis – The Merchant of Venice (Portia), Twelfth Night (Viola), Mourning Becomes Electra (Lavinia), MacBeth (Lady MacBeth), The Duchess of Malfi (Duchess), As You Like It (Rosalind), Measure for Measure (Isabella), All's Well That Ends Well (Helena), Much Ado About Nothing (Beatrice)
- Patrick Page – Othello (Iago), Macbeth (Macbeth), Coriolanus (Coriolanus), King Lear (King Lear).
- Siân Phillips – The Importance of Being Earnest (Lady Bracknell)
- Richard Schiff – Hughie (Erie Smith)
- Jean Stapleton – Romeo and Juliet (Nurse)
- Patrick Stewart – Othello (Othello)
- Rebecca Taichman – director (The Taming of the Shrew, Twelfth Night, Cymbeline, The Winter's Tale)
- Richard Thomas – Richard II (Richard)
- Bradley Whitford – Coriolanus (Coriolanus)
- Paul Winfield – Merry Wives of Windsor (Falstaff)
- Hannah Yelland – The Winter's Tale (Hermione)
- Mary Zimmerman – director (Pericles, Argonautika, Candide, The Notebooks of Leonardo da Vinci)

=== Commissioned works ===
The Shakespeare Theatre Company commissioned playwright David Ives to translapt (translate and adapt) a series of rediscovered European comedy masterpieces, as follows:

- The Liar by Pierre Corneille
- The Heir Apparent by Jean-François Regnard
- The Metromaniacs by Alexis Piron
- School for Lies, based on Molière's The Misanthrope
- The Panties, The Partner and the Profit: inspired by The Underpants, The Snob, 1913, and The Fossil by Carl Sternheim

All plays featured Ives's rhyming wordplay and were directed by Michael Kahn.

The Liar subsequently opened off-Broadway, again directed by Michael Kahn.

== Notable events ==
=== Black Iago in Othello ===
In 1990 artistic director Michael Kahn and black director Harold Scott cast black actors as Iago and Emilia, the trusted ensign who incites the Moor's fatal jealousy and his wife. With Avery Brooks as Othello, Andre Braugher as Iago and Franchelle Stewart Dorn as Emilia, the resulting production was critically acclaimed.

=== Race-reversed Othello ===
In 1997 the Shakespeare Theatre Company produced an Othello in which Othello was white with an otherwise all-black cast. Actor Patrick Stewart approached artistic director Michael Kahn with the concept: "I've been imagining myself playing Othello and, in a sense, preparing for it, since I was about 14. When the time came that I was old enough and experienced enough to do it, it was the same time that it no longer became acceptable for a white actor to put on blackface and pretend to be African. One of my hopes for this production is that it will continue to say what a conventional production of Othello would say about racism and prejudice... To replace the black outsider with a white man in a black society will, I hope, encourage a much broader view of the fundamentals of racism." Ron Canada performed the part of Iago. During the Meet the Cast event before the production, Stewart remarked that he realized that while he had never performed this role, all of the principal male actors in the cast had. He would learn from them.

=== The Oedipus Plays at the Athens Festival ===
After seeing The Shakespeare Theatre Company's production of The Oedipus Plays in September 2001, officials from the Greek Embassy in Washington arranged for an invitation to the company to perform it as part of the 2003 Athens Festival. The show was a single-evening adaption by Michael Kahn of Sophocles' three plays Oedipus Rex, Oedipus at Colonus and Antigone. He changed the setting from Greece to central Africa, and used an all-black cast headed by Avery Brooks. The performance was on 10–11 September 2003 in the semicircular 5,000-seat Odeon theater on the south slope of the Acropolis. As a historical footnote, the original production had just opened the week before the September 11 attacks. After a single performance cancellation that night, the show went on the next night (9/12) with a new meaning for cast and audience. The second Athens' performance was two years to the day after the attack.

=== Love's Labor's Lost at the Royal Shakespeare Company's Complete Works Festival ===
The Shakespeare Theatre Company took its production of Love’s Labor’s Lost to England to participate in the Royal Shakespeare Company’s Complete Works Festival. Performances were from 17 to 26 August 2006 in the Swan Theatre in Stratford-upon-Avon.

=== Shakespeare in Washington Festival ===
From January through June 2007, The Shakespeare Theatre co-hosted the International Shakespeare in Washington Festival. This celebration was conceived by Michael Kaiser, President of the Kennedy Center, and was curated by Michael Kahn. Over 60 arts organizations produced over 100 presentations.

=== Opening of Sidney Harman Hall ===
On 1 October 2007, Sidney Harman Hall opened with a gala performance emceed by Sam Waterston and featuring ballet dancers Nina Ananiashvili and Julio Bocca, Jazz at Lincoln Center Orchestra with Wynton Marsalis, actress Patti LuPone, violinist Anne-Sophie Mutter, The Washington Ballet, Washington Performing Arts Society’s (WPAS) Men and Women of the Gospel Mass Choir and actors from the Shakespeare Theatre Company.

=== Special performances of The Great Game: Afghanistan ===
At the request of US Department of Defense officials and with support funding from private sources, the Shakespeare Theatre Company donated Harman Hall. It provided logistical support for two all-day special performances of the full cycle of The Great Game: Afghanistan. The 10–11 February 2011 performances were offered free to soldiers, wounded veterans and government officials in the Washington, D.C., area.

== Awards ==
The Shakespeare Theatre Company both presents and receives awards. Annually it presents The Will Award and The Emery Battis award. Additionally it regularly receives awards for its productions.

=== The Will Award ===
The William Shakespeare Award for Classical Theatre (The Will Award) has been presented by the Shakespeare Theatre Company since 1988. The Will Award is an annual honor to recognize an artist who has significantly contributed to classical theatre in America. Since at least 2008 the award ceremony has been held under the patronage of the British Ambassador and his wife.

Recipients:

- 1988 – Joseph Papp
- 1989 – Kevin Kline
- 1990 – Christopher Plummer
- 1991 – Kenneth Branagh
- 1992 – Mel Gibson
- 1993 – Morgan Freeman
- 1994 – Christopher Walken
- 1995 – Lynn Redgrave
- 1996 – Sam Waterston
- 1997 – Patrick Stewart
- 1998 – Hal Holbrook
- 1999 – Dame Maggie Smith
- 2000 – Sir Anthony Hopkins
- 2001 – Ralph Fiennes
- 2002 – Michael Kahn
- 2003 – Fiona Shaw
- 2004 – Dame Judi Dench
- 2005 – Jeremy Irons
- 2006 – Kevin Spacey
- 2007 – The Shakespeare Theatre Company’s Acting Company
- 2008 – Rennie Harris, Peter Martins and Chita Rivera
- 2009 – Sir Ian McKellen
- 2010 – Annette Bening
- 2011 – Michael Kahn in honor of his 25th Anniversary as Artistic Director
- 2012 – F. Murray Abraham
- 2013 – Elizabeth McGovern
- 2014 – John Hurt, Stacy Keach and Diana Rigg
- 2015 – Julie Taymor
- 2016 – Charles Dance
- 2017 – Laura Linney
- 2018 – Phylicia Rashad
- 2019 – Dame Eileen Atkins

=== The Emery Battis Awards ===
The Emery Battis Award for Acting Excellence is presented annually at the first opening night of the new season to recognize two actors whose work in a mainstage production demonstrates outstanding classical technique. The award is funded by an anonymous donor and includes a cash prize. It is named for the long time and beloved Shakespeare Theatre Company actor Emery Battis.

Award recipients include:

Actor	Production	Role	Season
Adam Green	The Liar	Cliton (the valet)	2009–2010
Michael Hayden	Richard II, Henry V	Richard II, Henry V	2009–2010
Holly Twyford	Old Times	Anna	2010–2011
Mark Nelson	The Merchant of Venice	Shylock	2010–2011
Carson Elrod	The Heir Apparent	Crispin	2011–2012
Steven Epp	The Servant of Two Masters	Truffaldino	2011–2012
Diane D'Aquila	Coriolanus	Volumnia	2012–2013
Patrick Page	Coriolanus	Coriolanus	2012–2013
Bianca Amato	Private Lives	Amanda	2013–2014
Matthew Amendt	Henry IV, Part 1 and Part 2	Prince Hal	2013–2014
Amber Iman	Man of La Mancha	Aldonza	2014–2015
Robert Stanton	The Critic & The Real Inspector Hound	Puff & Moon	2015–2016
Robyn Hurder	Kiss Me Kate	Bianca/Lois Lane	2015–2016

=== Received awards ===
- Over the past 29 years, the Shakespeare Theatre Company has won over 80 Helen Hayes Awards for producing, acting, directing, and design achievements.
- 2012: The Shakespeare Theatre Company in Washington, D.C., received the Tony Award for Regional Theatre.

=== Press notices ===
- 2017: The Washington Post said, "The quality of its seasons has taken a hit over the past several years" and "Where once it regularly ventured into daring terrain...it is making a conscious choice to lead from behind."
- 2007: The New York Times said the Shakespeare Theatre has "a repertory of classics that no New York theater of similar size and scale can match."
- 2001: The Christian Science Monitor printed, "The Shakespeare Theatre: The best classical theater in the country, bar none."
- 1999: The Economist named the Shakespeare Theatre Company as one of the "world's three great Shakespearean theatres"

== Other activities ==
=== Free for All ===
In 1991, the Shakespeare Theatre Company began its annual Free For All productions at the Carter Barron Amphitheatre in D.C.'s Rock Creek Park. Each summer the company remounts a production from the previous season. Until 2009, these productions were held at the outdoor Amphitheatre in Rock Creek Park. However, in 2009 the company moved the free performances downtown and indoors For a complete list of the productions, see Shakespeare Theatre Company Free For All.

=== Rediscovery Series ===
Works for the ReDiscovery Series are chosen by Artistic Director Michael Kahn and presented under the direction of Shakespeare Theatre artistic staff. Guest artists join members of the Shakespeare Theatre Company and the Washington theatrical community to investigate these great but lesser known plays of world literature. The readings occur at the Lansburgh on at least three Mondays throughout the year and are hosted by company member Ted van Griethuysen. Guest scholars, translators and adaptors involved with the evening's reading also frequently participate in the rehearsal, performance and occasional post-performance discussion when time permits.

=== STC Academy ===
The Shakespeare Theatre Company and George Washington University offer a one-year intensive graduate program leading to a Master of Fine Arts degree. The curriculum focuses on the specific craft of acting Shakespeare and other classical texts. George Washington University provides accreditation for an MFA degree, resources and strong links to the Folger Shakespeare Library and the Library of Congress. The program has graduated over 100 actors who are now performing on stages in New York, Washington, D.C., and across the country.

== See also ==
- Helen Hayes Award
- Shakespeare Theatre Company Free For All
- Theater in Washington D.C.
