= Linda Emond =

American actress (born 1959)

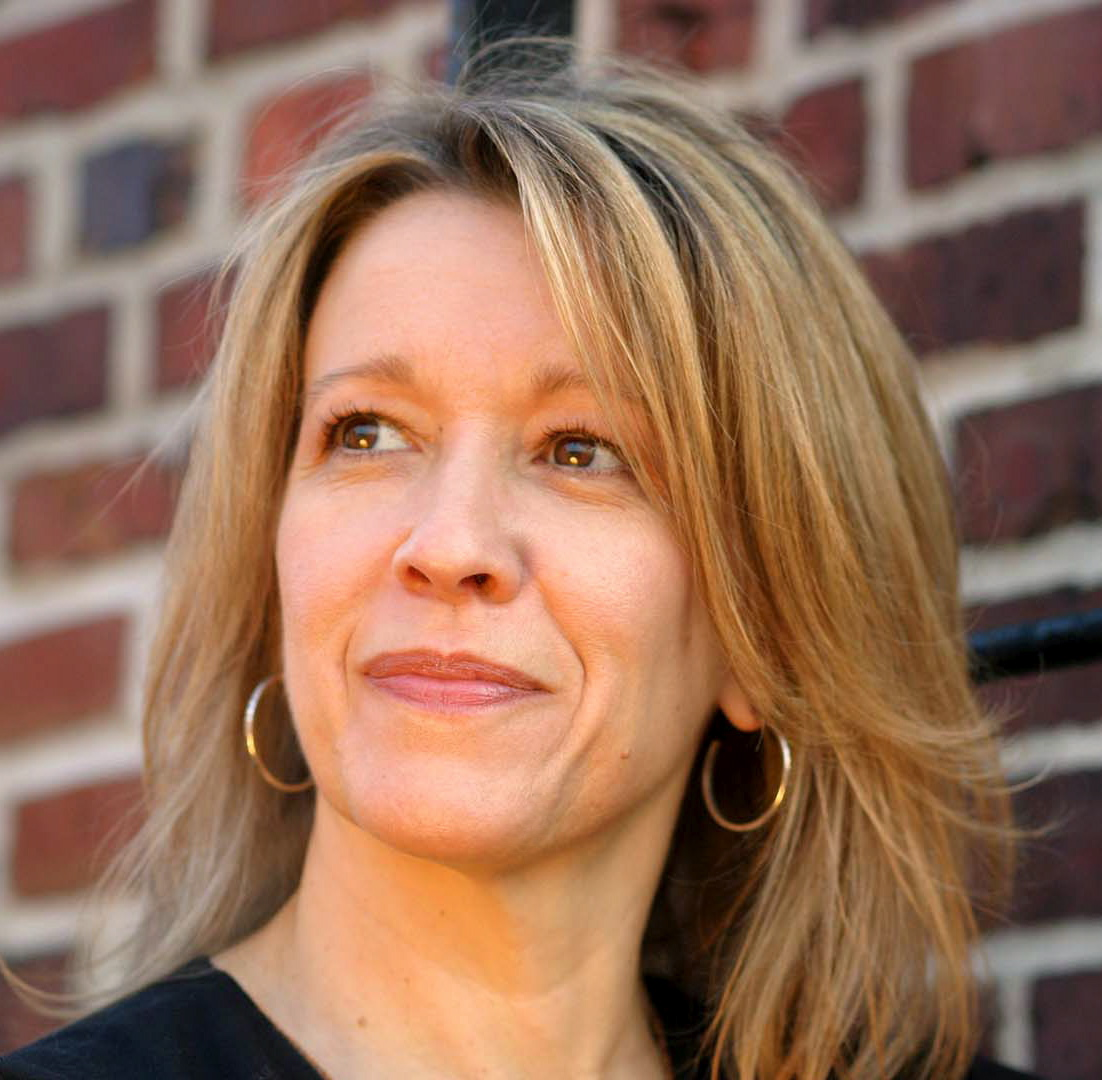
- Linda Emond (2007)
- Born: Linda Marie Emond; May 22, 1959 (age 67); New Brunswick, New Jersey, U.S.
- Education: California State University, Fullerton (BA); University of Washington, Seattle (MFA)
- Occupation: Actress
- Website: lindaemond.com

Linda Marie Emond (born May 22, 1959) is an American stage, film, and television actress. She has received three Tony Award nominations for her performances in Life (x) 3 (2003), Death of a Salesman (2012), and Cabaret (2014).

== Early life and education ==
Linda Marie Emond was born on May 22, 1959 in New Brunswick, New Jersey.

She was raised in Orange County, California, and attended Loara Elementary School, Ball Junior High, and Loara High School (where she was homecoming queen). Her first performance on stage was in high school as Jean Brodie in The Prime of Miss Jean Brodie.

She graduated with a BA in Theatre Arts from California State University, Fullerton in 1982. She earned an MFA from the Professional Actor Training Program at the University of Washington, Seattle.

== Career ==
Emond's first professional stage performance, for which she earned her Equity card, was in On the Verge at The Empty Space Theatre in Seattle during her last semester of graduate school.

She worked extensively in Chicago, where she went on to be nominated for five Joseph Jefferson Awards, winning it twice for her performances as Eliza Doolittle in Pygmalion and Paulina in The Winter's Tale.

She debuted on the New York stage in the Off-Broadway play Nine Armenians in 1996 at the Manhattan Theatre Club for which she received a Drama Desk Award nomination.

Emond performed in Tony Kushner's Homebody/Kabul in three separate productions, the first at the New York Theatre Workshop in 2001, receiving a nomination for a Drama Desk Award as Outstanding Featured Actress, and winning both the Lucille Lortel Award for Outstanding Actress and the 2002 Obie Award for Performance. She appeared in the same play at the Mark Taper Forum, Los Angeles and at the Brooklyn Academy of Music in 2004.

In 2011, she appeared off-Broadway in Tony Kushner's The Intelligent Homosexual's Guide to Capitalism and Socialism with a Key to the Scriptures as "Empty", a part that was written for her.

Emond was cast as "Elaine" in Craig Lucas's The Dying Gaul at the Vineyard Theater in 1998. She played the role of Queen Hermione in The Winter's Tale at the Public Theater production of Shakespeare in the Park in July 2010. Emond performed at Steppenwolf Theatre Company in Chicago in David Hare's The Secret Rapture in 1990 and at the Williamstown Theatre Festival in The Cherry Orchard (2004) and A.R. Gurney's Far East (1998).

On Broadway, Emond appeared in productions of the musical 1776 (1997) as Abigail Adams, and in Yasmina Reza's play Life x 3 (2003), for which she was nominated for the 2003 Tony Award as Best Featured Actress in a Play and for which she won the Outer Critics Circle Award. She starred as Linda Loman in the 2012 Broadway revival of Death of a Salesman, opposite Philip Seymour Hoffman and as Fraulein Schneider in the 2014 revival of Cabaret and received Tony nominations for both performances.

Emond's film and television roles include Simone Beck in Julie & Julia (2009), Georgia O'Keeffe (2009) a made-for-television Lifetime film, and as Abigail Adams in American Experience: John and Abigail Adams for PBS. In 2009, she played Mary Ann McCray in the Hallmark Hall of Fame television presentation of A Dog Named Christmas. She has had recurring roles in such New York-based television series as The Good Wife, Law & Order: Special Victims Unit, Gossip Girl, Wonderland, Elementary, and The Knick.

She is also a voiceover actor, having narrated over 50 episodes of the Lifetime series Intimate Portrait. As an audiobook reader, Emond is the recipient of four Audiofile Earphones Awards and was named one of their Best Voices of the Year.

Emond co-starred in Indignation (2016), an adaptation of Philip Roth's 2008 novel of the same name, playing Esther Messner, the mother of Logan Lerman's lead character.

She was a cast member of the AMC comedy-drama Lodge 49, playing Connie Clark.

In 2022, Emond guest starred as Clara Barton on HBO's The Gilded Age.

== Filmography ==
=== Films ===
Year	Title	Role	Notes
1989	God's Will	Gwyneth	
2000	Pollock	Martha Holmes	
2001	Almost Salinas	Nina Ellington	
2002	A Gentleman's Game	Meredith Price	
2002	City by the Sea	Margery	
2005	The Dying Gaul	Dr. Marta Foss	
2005	Dark Water	Mediator (Edith Levine)	
2005	North Country	Leslie Conlin	
2006	Trade	Patty Sheridan	
2007	Across the Universe	Mrs. Carrigan	
2008	Stop-Loss	Ida King	
2009	The Missing Person	Megan Fullmer	
2009	Julie & Julia	Simone Beck	
2011	A Bird of the Air	Margie	
2013	Oldboy	Dr. Edwina Burke	
2015	Jenny's Wedding	Rose Farrell	
2015	3 Generations	Frances	
2015	The Family Fang	Miss Delano	
2016	Indignation	Esther Messner	
2016	The Land	Momma	
2017	The Big Sick	Dr. Cunningham	
2017	Song to Song	Judy	
2018	The Professor	Barbara	
2019	Gemini Man	Lassiter	
2021	The Unforgivable	Rachel Malcolm	
2022	Causeway	Gloria	

=== Television ===
Year	Title	Role	Notes
1992	L.A. Law	Dr. Emily Connor	Episode: "Great Balls Afire"
1992	Mann & Machine	Monica Barker	Episode: "Truth or Consequences"
1993	Reasonable Doubts	Pamela Reichel	Episode: "Legacy"
1993	I Can Make You Love Me	Penny	Television film
1996	Law & Order	Laura Cochran	Episode: "Savior"
1997	Feds	June Leeds	Episode: "The War Against Crime" (pilot)
1997	New York Undercover	Nancy Carol	Episode: "The Unthinkable"
2000	Wonderland	A.D.A. Strictler	4 episodes
2000	The Sopranos	Dahlia	Episode: "Big Girls Don't Cry"
2000	Law & Order	Carolyn Tyler	Episode: "Panic"
2000	Third Watch	Francine Bradley	Episode: "Duty"
2002	Law & Order: Criminal Intent	Dr. Christine Fellowes	Episode: "Anti-Thesis"
2004–2022	Law & Order: Special Victims Unit	Dr. Emily Sopher	8 episodes
2005	Law & Order: Trial by Jury	Dr. Emily Downey	Episode: "Baby Boom"
2005	Law & Order	Rosalie Helton	Episode: "Tombstone"
2006	American Experience: John and Abigail Adams	Abigail Adams	Television film
2008	30 Rock	Commercial voice	Episode: "Gavin Volure"; uncredited
2008–2009	Gossip Girl	Headmistress Queller	3 episodes
2009	Georgia O'Keeffe	Beck Strand	Television film
2009	A Dog Named Christmas	Mary Ann McCray	Television film
2010–2012	The Good Wife	Judge Leora Kuhn	3 episodes
2011	Unforgettable	Debi Moser	Episode: "Check Out Time"
2013	Elementary	Dr. Candace Reed	3 episodes
2015	The Knick	Anne Chickering	3 episodes
2015–2019	Madam Secretary	Carol Jackson	4 episodes
2016	BrainDead	Kara Wright	Episode: "Taking on Water: How Leaks in D.C. Are Discovered and Patched"
2016	The Blacklist	Dr. Adrian Shaw	2 episodes
2018–2019	Lodge 49	Connie Clark	20 episodes
2020	The Good Fight	Judge Leora Kuhn	Episode: "The Gang Goes to War"
2021	The Bite	Lisa Quinto	4 episodes
2021	Succession	Michelle-Anne Vanderhoven	3 episodes
2022	The Gilded Age	Clara Barton	3 episodes
2022	The Patient	Candace Fortner	
2023	Only Murders in the Building	Donna DeMeo	10 episodes
2024	Death and Other Details	Hilde Eriksen	
2026	The Miniature Wife	Diane McMichael Jones	

=== Stage ===
Year	Title	Role	Notes
1988	Pygmalion	Eliza Doolittle	Court Theatre, Chicago
1990	The Secret Rapture	Isobel	Steppenwolf Theatre Company, Chicago
1996	Nine Armenians	Mom	Manhattan Theatre Club, Off-Broadway
1997	1776	Abigail Adams	Criterion Center Stage Right, Broadway
1997	Baby Anger	Woman	Playwrights Horizons, Off-Broadway
1998	Far East	Julia	Williamstown Theatre Festival
1998	The Dying Gaul	Elaine	Vineyard Theatre, Off-Broadway
1999	An Experiment with an Air Pump	Susannah Fenwick/ Ellen	Manhattan Theatre Club, Off-Broadway
2001	Homebody/Kabul	Homebody	New York Theatre Workshop, Off-Broadway
2002	The Resistible Rise of Arturo Ui	Betty Dullfeet	Michael Schimmel Center for the Arts at Pace University
2003	Life x 3	Inez	Circle in the Square Theatre, Broadway
2004	The Cherry Orchard	Liubov Ranyevskaya	Williamstown Theatre Festival
2004	Homebody/Kabul	Homebody	Brooklyn Academy of Music, Off-Broadway
2007	Spanish Play	Aurelia	Classic Stage Company, Off-Broadway
2010	The Winter's Tale	Queen Hermione	Shakespeare in the Park, Off-Broadway
2011	The Intelligent Homosexual's Guide to Capitalism and Socialism With a Key to the Scriptures	Empty	The Public Theater, Off-Broadway
2012	Death of a Salesman	Linda Loman	Ethel Barrymore Theatre, Broadway
2014	Cabaret	Fraulein Schneider	Studio 54, Broadway
2019	A Bright Room Called Day	Annabella	The Public Theater, Off-Broadway
2026	Becky Shaw	Susan	Helen Hayes Theater, Broadway

== Awards and nominations ==
Award	Year	Category	Nominated Work	Result	Ref.
Backstage West Garland Award	2003	Performance	Homebody/Kabul	Won	
Dorian Award	2026	Outstanding Featured Performance in a Broadway Play	Becky Shaw	Nominated	
Drama Desk Award	1997	Outstanding Featured Actress in a Play	Nine Armenians	Nominated	
Drama Desk Award	2002	Outstanding Featured Actress in a Play	Homebody/Kabul	Nominated	
Drama Desk Award	2026	Outstanding Featured Actress in a Play	Becky Shaw	Nominated	
Drama League Award	2011	Distinguished Performance	The Intelligent Homosexual's Guide to Capitalism and Socialism with a Key to the Scriptures	Nominated	
Joseph Jefferson Award	1987	Actress in a Supporting Role-Play	Tartuffe	Nominated	
Joseph Jefferson Award	1989	Actress in a Principal Role-Play	Pygmalion	Won	
Joseph Jefferson Award	1990	Actress in a Supporting Role-Play	The Winter's Tale	Won	
Joseph Jefferson Award	1991	Actress in a Principal Role-Play	The Secret Rapture	Nominated	
Joseph Jefferson Award	1991	Actress in a Principal Role-Play	Caucasian Chalk Circle	Nominated	
LA Drama Critics Award	2004	Lead Performance	Homebody/Kabul	Nominated	
LA Ovation Award	2004	Lead Actress in a Play	Homebody/Kabul	Nominated	
Lucille Lortel Award	2002	Outstanding Lead Actress in a Play	Homebody/Kabul	Won	
Obie Award	2002	Distinguished Performance	Homebody/Kabul	Won	
Outer Critics Circle Award	2003	Outstanding Featured Actress in a Play	Life x 3	Won	
Peabody Award	2022	Entertainment	The Patient	Nominated	
Screen Actors Guild Awards	2024	Outstanding Ensemble in a Comedy Series	Only Murders in the Building	Nominated	
Tony Award	2003	Best Featured Actress in a Play	Life x 3	Nominated	
Tony Award	2012	Best Featured Actress in a Play	Death of a Salesman	Nominated	
Tony Award	2014	Best Featured Actress in a Musical	Cabaret	Nominated	
