= Stage on Screen =

- Genre: Theatre
- Country of origin: United States
- Original language: English
- No. of episodes: 6

Production
- Production company: WNET

Original release
- Network: PBS
- Release: October 7, 2000 – January 1, 2003

Stage on Screen was a series broadcast on public television PBS affiliate Thirteen WNET New York, which presents American theatrical productions that consist of cinematic and made-for-TV adaptations, live broadcasts, and documentaries that relate to the process of staging theatrical performances.

It is not to be confused with Stage on Screen, the London-based company producing DVD versions of classic stage plays.

== Episodes ==
- The Man Who Came to Dinner
- Anna Deavere Smith's Twilight: Los Angeles 1992
- A. R. Gurney's Far East
- Clare Boothe Luce's The Women
- Tantalus: Behind the Mask (a documentary on John Barton's Tantalus)
- Beckett on Film
