= Life x 3 =

French play by Yasmina Resa

Trois versions de la vie (literally Three versions of life) is the fifth play by the French writer Yasmina Reza, written in 2000. It was produced at the Théâtre Antoine in Paris in 2001, in a production directed by Patrice Kerbrat and with a cast composed of Catherine Frot, Stéphane Freiss, Richard Berry and the author herself.

Its English translation by Christopher Hampton, under the title Life x 3, was premiered at the Lyttleton auditorium of the Royal National Theatre from 7 December 2000 to 16 January 2001, before transferring to the Old Vic from 12 February to 5 May 2001 with the entire original cast of Mark Rylance, Harriet Walter, Imelda Staunton and Oliver Cotton; directed by Mathew Warchus. It was then revived with a new cast at the Savoy Theatre in October 2002.

The play was produced by Melbourne Theatre Company at the Victorian Arts Centre in 2002 with Jane Menelaus, Geoffrey Rush, Deidre Rubenstein, Tony Llewellyn-Jones and Robert John. It was directed by Simon Phillips.

The Broadway production at Circle in the Square Theatre, was presented in 2003. Directed by Mathew Warchus the cast included Helen Hunt, John Turturro, Brent Spiner and Linda Emond.

A production was performed in Brighton during August 2013 by Pretty Villain Productions.

Cesear's Forum, Cleveland's minimalist theatre company at Playhouse Square, presented the play in September/October 2017, with Tricia Bestic, Brian Bowers, Dana Hart and Julia Kolibab. It was directed by Greg Cesear.

== Awards and nominations ==
=== Original Broadway production ===
Year	Award	Category	Nominee	Result
2003	Tony Award	Best Featured Actress in a Play	Linda Emond	Nominated
