= Almost Salinas =

- Directed by: Terry Green
- Written by: Terry Green
- Produced by: Wade W. Danielson
- Starring: John Mahoney; Linda Emond; Lindsay Crouse; Virginia Madsen
- Cinematography: David Garden
- Edited by: Jennifer Krouse
- Music by: David Reynolds
- Production company: Strata Productions
- Distributed by: Curb Entertainment
- Release date: April 30, 2001 (USA Film Festival)
- Running time: 92 minutes
- Country: United States
- Language: English

Almost Salinas is a 2001 American film written and directed by Terry Green and starring John Mahoney, Linda Emond, Lindsay Crouse and Virginia Madsen.

== Cast ==
- John Mahoney as Max Harris
- Linda Emond as Nina Ellington
- Lindsay Crouse as Allie
- Virginia Madsen as Clare
- Ian Gomez as Manny
- Nathan Davis as Zelder Hill
- Tom Groenwald as Leo Quinlan
- Ray Wise as Jack Tynan
- Amanda Pitera as Billie
- Glenn Dunk as Jason
- Lucy Reeves as Moira
- Adrian Neil as Dante
- Eric Wrye as Buz

== Reception ==
The film has a 20% rating on Rotten Tomatoes. Roger Ebert awarded the film one and a half stars. Robert K. Elder of the Chicago Tribune gave it two and a half stars.
