= The Intelligent Homosexual's Guide to Capitalism and Socialism with a Key to the Scriptures =

2009 play by Tony Kushner

The Intelligent Homosexual's Guide to Capitalism and Socialism with a Key to the Scriptures is a 2009 play by American playwright Tony Kushner. The title was inspired by George Bernard Shaw's The Intelligent Woman's Guide to Socialism and Capitalism and Mary Baker Eddy's Science and Health with Key to the Scriptures.

== Production history ==
The premiere was directed by Michael Greif at the Guthrie Theater in Minneapolis, opening on May 15, 2009, in previews and running through June 28.

The Public Theater and the Signature Theater Company co-produced a somewhat rewritten version of the play, which premiered Off-Broadway at the Public Theater on March 23, 2011 in previews, with opening on May 5 and closing on June 12. The play was directed by Michael Greif and featured Michael Cristofer, Linda Emond, Michael Esper and Stephen Spinella.

Berkeley Repertory Theatre presented the play's West Coast premiere starting in May 2014. Berkeley Rep artistic director Tony Taccone directed, and actors included Mark Margolis as Gus, Deirdre Lovejoy as Empty, and Lou Liberatore as Pill.

The play received its London premiere in October 2016 at the Hampstead Theatre in a production directed by Michael Boyd and starring David Calder as Gus, and Tamsin Greig as Empty.

== Plot ==
The play looks at the life of a 20th-century thinker, retired longshoreman Gus Marcantonio, who is feeling confused and defeated by the 21st century. In summer 2007, his sister, who has been staying with him for a year, invites Gus's three children (who in turn bring along spouses, ex-spouses, lovers and more) to a most unusual family reunion in their Brooklyn brownstone.

== Original Guthrie Theater cast ==
- Mark Benninghofen as Adam Butler
- Kathleen Chalfant as Benedicta Immacolata Marcantonio (Bennie)
- Sun Mee Chomet as Sooze Moon Marcantonio
- Michael Cristofer as Augusto Giuseppe Garibaldi Marcantonio (Gus)
- Linda Emond as Maria Teresa Marcantonio (M.T.)
- Michael Esper as Eli Wolcott
- Charity Jones as Maeve Ludens
- Ron Menzel as Vito Marcantonio (V, Vic, Vinnie)
- Michelle O'Neill as Shelle O'Neill
- Michael Potts as Paul Pierce
- Stephen Spinella as Pier Luigi Marcantonio (Pill)

== London premiere cast ==
Hampstead Theatre - October 2016

- David Calder as Gus
- Richard Clothier as Pill
- Daniel Flynn as Adam
- Tamsin Greig as Empty
- Sara Kestelman as Clio
- Katie Leung as Sooze
- Luke Newberry as Eli
- Sirine Saba as Maeve
- Rhashan Stone as Paul
- Lex Shrapnel as V
- Katy Stephens as Shelle

== Early reception ==
According to an article in the St. Paul Pioneer Press, only local critics were encouraged to review the play. National critics like Ben Brantley of The New York Times, who was originally invited to review the play, were asked to wait for a future production. The reviews that have been published have been somewhat mixed, acknowledging that the play is in early stages, while praising many of its positive moments. The Star Tribune ran a review stating "The lines sound great in the actors' mouths, their performances are excellent and Greif dances this show across the Guthrie stage with humor and muscular strokes. It is a very American work - a dense rush of ideas." While going on to observe that the "operatic cacophony at times skates precipitously close to the razor's edge of incoherence."
