= Emery Battis =

American war veteran, stage actor, author, and professor of American colonial history

- Born: May 30, 1915; Arlington, Massachusetts
- Died: September 20, 2011 (aged 96); Marlborough, Massachusetts, U.S
- Occupations: Actor, author, professor
- Years active: 1933–2006
- Spouse: Elizabeth Neuman
- Children: 5

Emery Battis (born May 30, 1915, in Arlington, Massachusetts – September 20, 2011, in Marlborough, Massachusetts) was an American stage actor, author, and professor of history with an acting career that spanned almost 80 years (from 1933 – 2006). He was the author of an award-winning book about Anne Hutchinson entitled Saints and Sectaries: Anne Hutchinson and the Antinomian Controversy in the Massachusetts Bay Colony.

== Early life ==
Battis graduated from Harvard in 1942. He served in the Army Air Forces during World War II, as well as appearing in Moss Hart's play Winged Victory on Broadway (later made into a movie of the same name). After the war, he went to Columbia, earning a master's degree in 1948 and a doctorate in history in 1958. He taught colonial history at Rutgers University from 1948 to 1968. He retired from academia and teaching in his 50s to act full time.

== Acting career ==
He started acting in 1933 and was still a working actor up until at least 2006, when he was in his early nineties. He would often play more than one character in the same production, and was highly skilled at using makeup and other techniques to change his appearance. The Washington Post said he "had a booming, cultivated voice".

His Broadway credits include (1932–1974) Alice in Wonderland, Winged Victory, King Henry VIII, What Every Woman Knows, John Gabriel Borkman, A Pound on Demand / Androcles and the Lion, Yellow Jack, The House of Atreus, The Resistible Rise of Arturo Ui, and The National Health.

He played numerous roles with the Shakespeare Theatre Company in Washington. The Emery Battis Award is named after him. Of the thirty-seven plays in Shakespeare's oeuvre, he was in all but one (Cymbeline). The New York Times said he was "very good as a weary, cautious Banquo" in a performance of Macbeth. His favourite Shakespearean role was that of King Lear he told Washingtonian Magazine in 1993 because it left room for invention.

His final role, aged 91, was a performance of Love Labour's Lost in Stratford-upon-Avon (Shakespeare's birthplace) in 2006.

He mainly focused on the stage, but also had some television roles in St. Elsewhere, The Adams Chronicles, and Great Performances.

In the 1960s, the Cleveland Plain Dealer proclaimed him "the best Lear of our generation." For his role in Anton Chekhov's The Sea Gull, The New York Times said "Mr. Battis turns the enfeebled Sorin's wheelchair into a touching metaphor for the gravitational pull of old age".

== Personal life ==
His first marriage was to Elaine Cunningham, with whom he had five children. His second wife is Elizabeth Neuman. He had three stepchildren, twelve grandchildren, and four great-grandchildren.

He lived in Washington for over twenty-five years and would often volunteer at the Smithsonian American Art Museum.

== Awards and nominations ==
He received an award in 1963 from the Institute of Early American History and Culture for his book about Anne Hutchinson.

Received the Helen Hayes Award in 2002 for lifetime contributions to Washington theatre.

The Emery Battis Award is named after him.
