= Shakespeare Theatre Company Free For All =

Annual theatre performances by the Shakespeare Theatre Company

In 1991, the Shakespeare Theatre Company, under Artistic Director Michael Kahn, initiated its annual Free For All performances in Washington, D.C.'s Rock Creek Park. Each year the Company performed a show free to the public, usually from a previous season. In 2009 the Free For All was moved indoors to Sidney Harman Hall, one of two theatres operated by STC in downtown D.C. This more accessible location allowed STC to perform rain or shine, offer matinees, maintain the artistic excellence of the production and increase the overall number of Free For All performances. Plans for future productions have been put on hold since the COVID pandemic began in 2020.

The first Free For All production in 1991 was The Merry Wives of Windsor, starring Paul Winfield as Falstaff. More recent shows have included Much Ado about Nothing, A Midsummer Night's Dream and Pericles. A Midsummer Night's Dream, the Free For All production for 2005, traveled to the Aspen Institute's Ideas Festival in Colorado that same summer.

The STC received The Washington Post Award for Distinguished Community Service in 1992 and the 1997 Public Humanities Award from the Humanities Council of Washington D.C. for the Free For All.

== Free For All productions ==
- Summer 2019: Hamlet
- Summer 2018: Romeo and Juliet
- Summer 2017: Othello
- Summer 2016: The Tempest
- Summer 2015: A Midsummer Night's Dream
- Summer 2014: The Winter's Tale
- Summer 2013: Much Ado About Nothing
- Summer 2012: All's Well That Ends Well
- Summer 2011: Julius Caesar
- Summer 2010: Twelfth Night
- Summer 2009: The Taming of the Shrew
- Summer 2008: Hamlet
- Summer 2007: Love's Labour's Lost
- Summer 2006: Pericles
- Summer 2005: A Midsummer Night's Dream
- Summer 2004: Much Ado about Nothing
- Summer 2003: Hamlet
- Summer 2002: The Two Gentlemen of Verona
- Summer 2001: King Lear
- Summer 2000: The Merchant of Venice
- Summer 1999: The Merry Wives of Windsor
- Summer 1998: All's Well That Ends Well
- Summer 1997: Henry V
- Summer 1996: Measure for Measure
- Summer 1995: Twelfth Night
- Summer 1994: The Comedy of Errors
- Summer 1993: Much Ado about Nothing
- Summer 1992: As You Like It
- Summer 1991: The Merry Wives of Windsor

== See also ==
- Shakespeare Theatre Company
- Michael Kahn (theatre director)
