= Sidney Harman Hall =

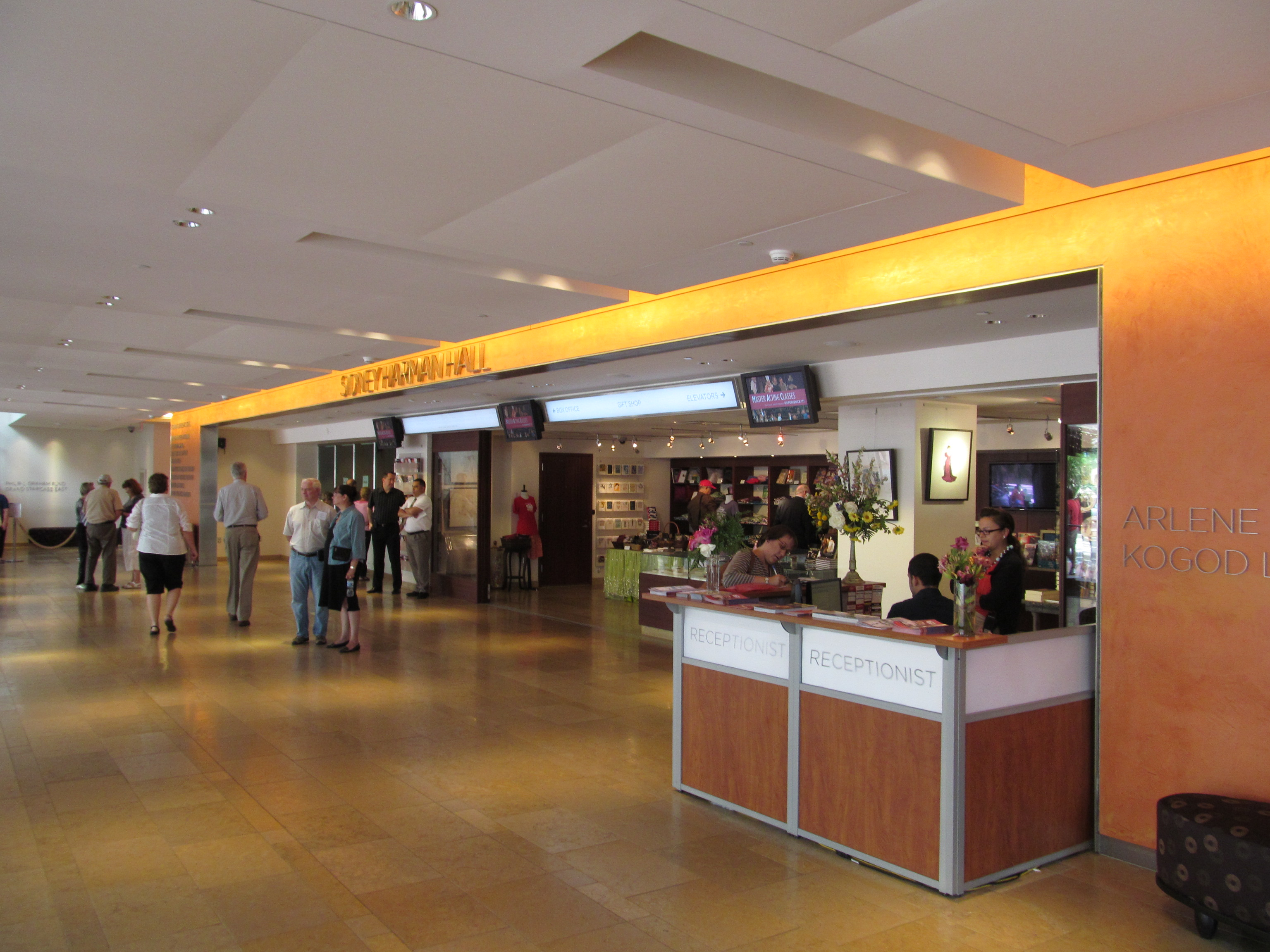
- Lobby of the theater

- Location within Washington, D.C.
- Address: 610 F St. NW; Washington, D.C. United States
- Coordinates: 38.897028°N 77.020479°W

Construction
- Opened: 2007

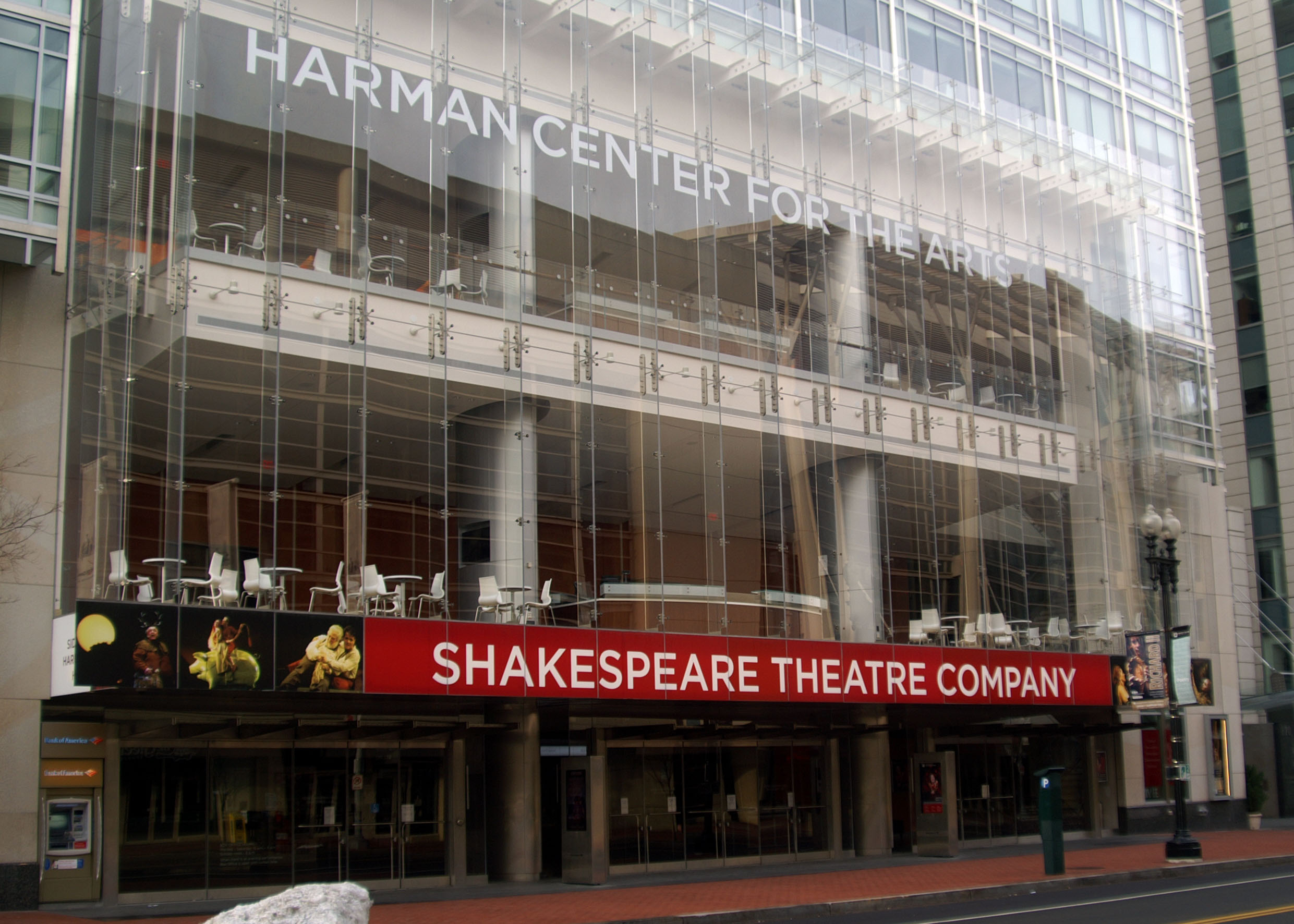
Sidney Harman Hall, 610 F Street NW, Washington, DC

Sidney Harman Hall is a theater at Sixth and F Streets NW in Washington, D.C. Along with the Klein Theatre it is the home of the Shakespeare Theatre Company (STC).

Built for $89 million, the building was designed by Paul Beckmann of the DC firm Smithgroup; the theater itself by Toronto architect Jack Diamond. It opened on October 1, 2007.

The Harman seats 761, an increase over the Klein's 445. The stage accommodates multiple staging configurations, allowing it to be rented by various arts groups. The walls of the theater are panels of makore, an African wood; velour curtains behind the panels can be raised to alter the room's acoustics. The first several rows of seats are on movable wagons that can be either set parallel to the stage or rotated to form a thrust stage.

The theatre is named for Dr. Sidney Harman, a philanthropist and STC trustee.

From October 25–28, 2010, Sidney Harman Hall hosted The Daily Show with Jon Stewart, including the October 27 show whose guest was President Barack Obama.

== See also ==
- Theater in Washington D.C.
